= Governor of the Bastille =

Commanders of the Bastille fortress

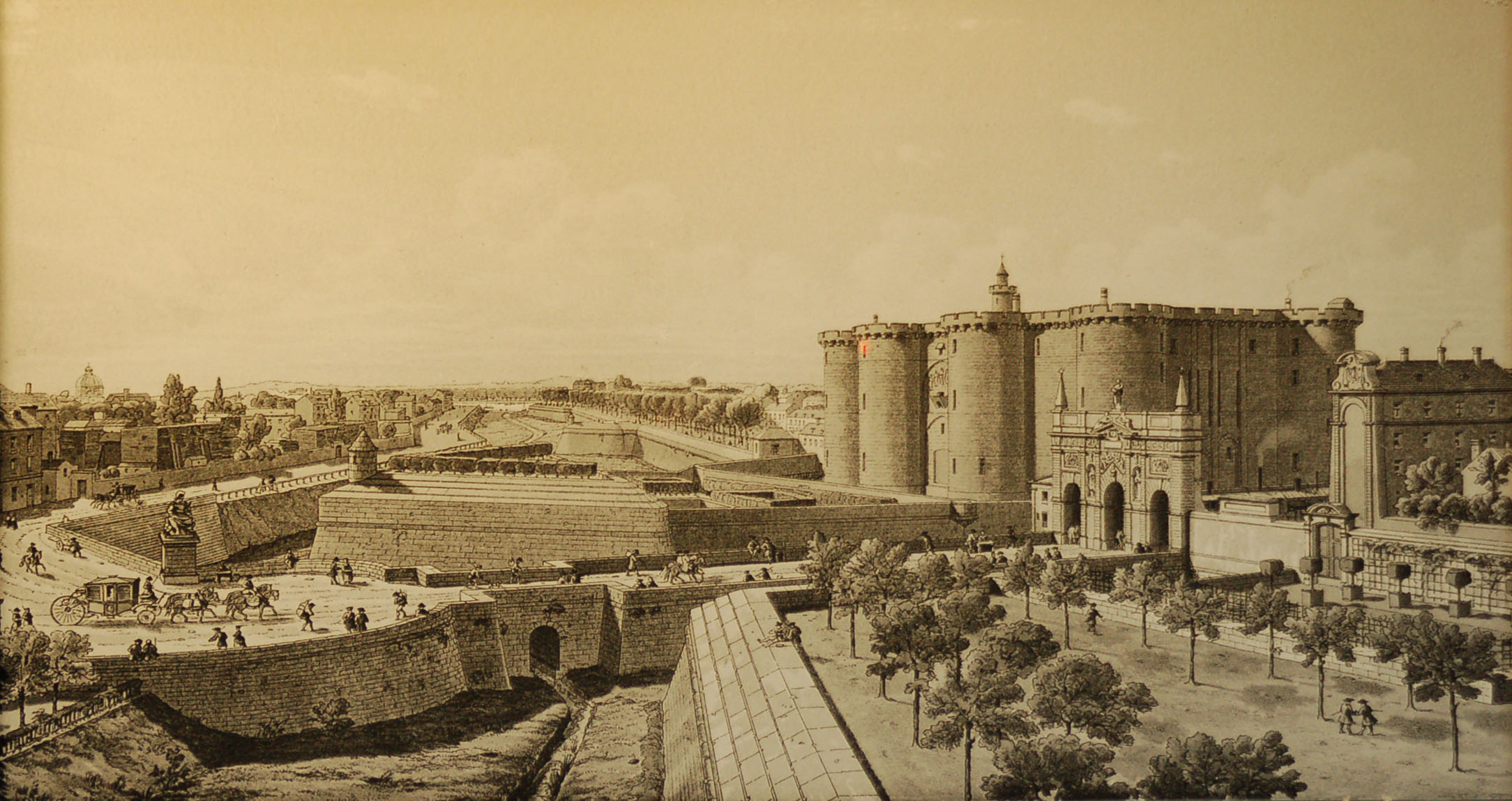
The Bastille

The Bastille or Bastille Saint-Antoine was completed in 1383. The commander of the Bastille was its governor, and was previously called capitaine.

== History ==
In 1367, King Charles V ordered the construction of the fort et bastide Saint Anthoine lez Paris, literally fort and bastide of Saint Anthony close to Paris, which will later take the name of Bastille. The works will be completed twenty years later, in 1387, under the reign of Charles VI. The first captain-governor was a close acquaintance of the King, already chamberlain under the two previous reigns: Jehan de La Personne, knight, viscount of Acy, lord of Beu and Nesle-en-Tardenois, chamberlain of the King. He is quoted in numerous documents between 1386 and November 1404, date of his death that are now held in the department of manuscripts of the Bibliothèque nationale de France. The last governor to hold this position, the unfortunate Bernard-René de Launay, appointed in 1776, was beheaded on 14 July 1789 and replaced by a provisional governor during the demolition of the building.

At the end of the Ancien Régime, the governor of the Bastille was reduced to being a subordinate of the lieutenant-general of police. He could do nothing without the express order of this magistrate. A governor who would have dared to adhere to the regulations and to only recognize orders given by the King, would not have remained long in command. If he wanted to remain, he had no other rules to follow than the orders of the lieutenant-general of police, or even those of a simple police commissioner

Article 1 of the regulation of 20 September 1764, signed by the King stated:

"The governor who commands, or any other officer, shall recognize only the orders of His Majesty and those given to him by the secretary of state."

However, a letter dated 23 September 1764, signed by the Secretary of State, authorizes the following:

"I enclose here, Sir, the regulations which the King has thought fit to render for the service of the Bastille. The King finds it fitting that when the Lieutenant-General of Police sends you prisoners, you receive them on a letter from him until a letter can be sent to you in good form, as has often been used and according to that circumstances that demand it. You will do well to use them in the same way, for the visits which the lieutenant-general of police thinks they can allow prisoners to receive and who do not require a formal order, but only a letter from him."

The regulation also ordered the exact registration of the first and last names of prisoners for entry, exit and death, but the ministerial instruction authorized the substitution of surnames and given names. This is how Jean Henri Latude was registered under his real name, later under the names of Danry, Maiville and Villemain. The Man in the Iron Mask was buried under the name of Marchiali with a false indication of age.

The position of governor of the Bastille, all military ranks, all military posts, the provincial governors, were negotiated as bills of exchange. It was only a matter of obtaining the approval of the King, it was a common commercial sale. These transactions were considered normal at the time. The purchaser of the title of Governor of the Bastille was always certain of a good deal if he lived a long life. A year or two in office, was largely sufficient to repay the purchase.

== List of governors of the Bastille ==
- 1386-1404 : Jehan de La Personne, vicomte d'Acy
- 1404-1413 : Lord of Saint-Georges
- 1413-1416 : Louis VII, Duke of Bavaria
- 1416-???? : Thomas de Beaumont
- 1417-1418 : Tanneguy du Chastel
- 1418-???? : Robert de Canni
- 1420-1436 : Under English occupation
- 1475 : Philippe l'Huillier
- 1588 : Jean Bussy-Leclerc
- 1588-1594 : Antoine Dumaine Dubourg l'Espinasse
- 1594-1601 : Devic
- 1601-1611 : Maximilien de Béthune, duc de Sully
- 1611-???? : Marie de' Medici (Joachim de Châteauvieux)
- 1617-1617 : François de Bassompierre
- 1617-1617 : Charles d'Albert, duc de Luynes
- 1617-1626 : Nicolas de L'Hospital de Vitry
- 1626-7 May 1626 : Léon d'Albert de Bréauté
- 7 May 1626-???? : François de L'Hospital du Hallier
- ????-1649 : Charles Leclerc du Tremblay
- ????-1652 : Louvière Broussel
- 1652 : Antoine de Loyac sieur de la Bachellerie
- 1658-18 December 1697 : François de Montlezun
- 1698-1698 : François Michel Le Tellier de Louvois
- 18 September 1698 – 18 September 1708 : Bénigne Dauvergne de Saint-Mars
- 1708-1718 : Charles le Fournier de Bernaville
- 1718-1749 : René Jourdan de Launay
- 1749-5 December 1758 : Pierre Baisle
- 1758-1761 : François-Jérôme d'Abadie
- 1761-1776 : Antoine-Joseph de Jumilhac
- 1776-14 July 1789 : Bernard-René Jourdan de Launay
- Provisional Governor of the Bastille : Prosper Soulès

== Biographies of the governors ==
=== Jehan de La Personne, vicomte d'Acy ===
Councillor, Minister of State and Chamberlain of the Kings Jean II, Charles V and Charles VI, Jehan de La Personne was the first Captain of the Bastille. One of the receipts quoting him dates from 12 December 1387. It is addressed to him by Jehan le Flamenc, Treasurer of the Wars of the King, "for the state of his wages as captain and those of the abovenamed seven squires and ten arbalsters of foot of our company, having served and to serve in this present war to the guard the safety and defense of said fort and bastide Saint-Antoine."

=== Lord of Saint-Georges ===
On the death of his first captain, the Lord of Saint-Georges received in 1404 his command from the King of France, Charles VI.

=== Louis VII, Duke of Bavaria ===
Prince Louis VII of Bavaria, brother of Isabeau of Bavaria and uncle of the Dauphin Charles.

=== Thomas de Beaumont ===
Thomas de Beaumont had left Paris with the troops he could muster to aid the Constable de Richemont, and was killed in the battle which took place between Saint-Denis and Pierrefitte.

=== Tanneguy du Chastel ===
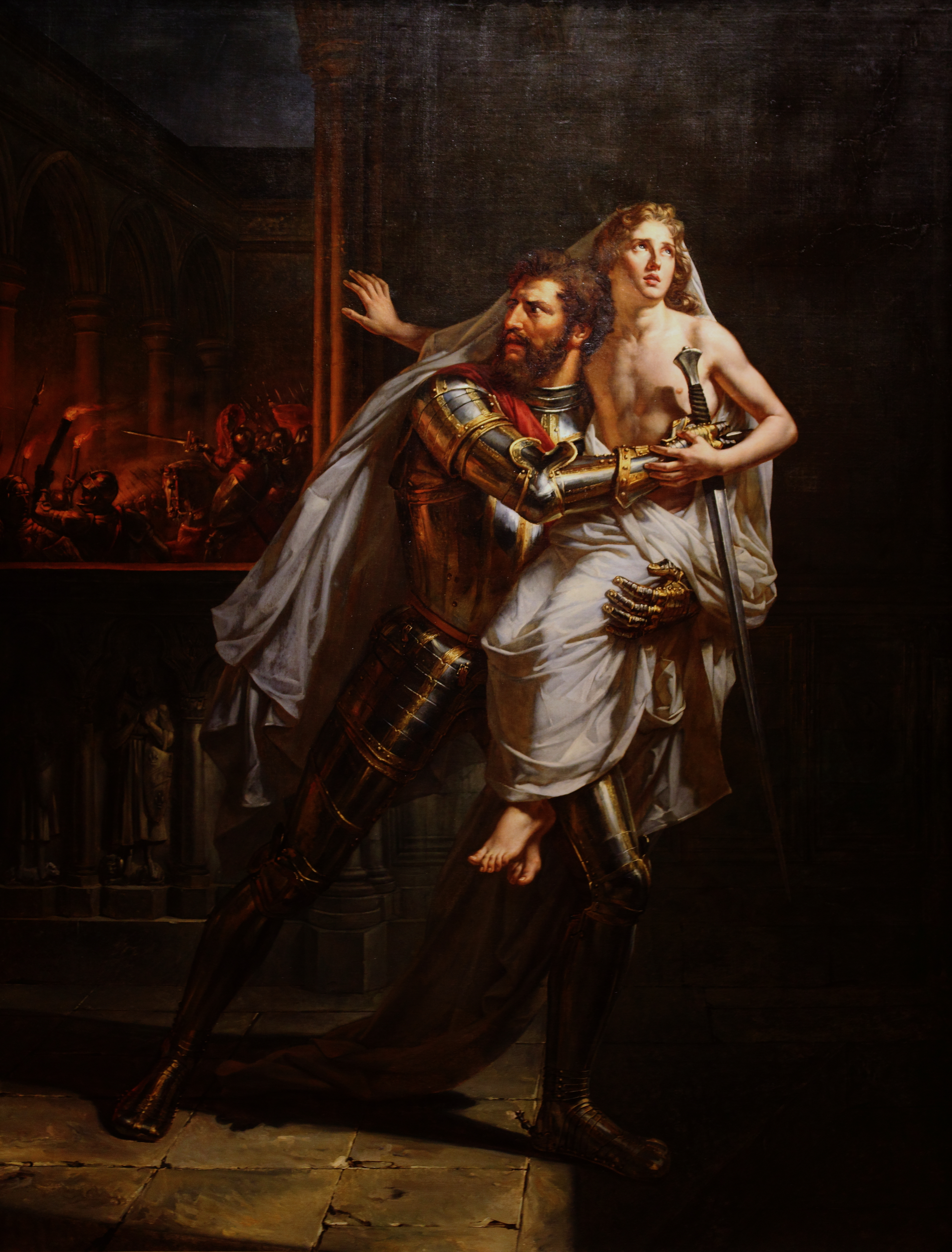
Tanneguy du Châtel rescuing the Dauphin. Couder, 1828.

Tanneguy du Chastel, Provost of Paris succeeded, in all probability, as Governor of the Bastille to the Duke of Bar in 1417–1418.

During the Armagnac–Burgundian Civil War, Paris surrendered to Jean de Villiers de L'Isle-Adam, captain of a troop of supporters of the Duke of Burgundy. Tanneguy succeeded in removing the Dauphin who was amidst his enemies and protected him by welcoming him to the Bastille. On 29 May 1418, the Dauphin left the Bastille to take refuge in Bourges with loyalists.

"Tanneguy ran to the Dauphin's room and, finding him asleep, wrapped him in one of his sheets and had him brought to the Bastille. The Dauphin slept there only one night, and the next morning he went to Melun and from there to Montargis. Tanneguy had returned to Paris by the Porte Saint-Antoine, of which he was the master because of the Bastille."

=== Robert de Canni ===
Arriving at the Bastille, Tanneguy du Chastel, accompanied by Marshal Pierre de Rieux and Arnaud Guillaume de Barbazan, and 1600 men marched on the Hôtel Saint-Pol, shouting "Vive le Roi et le Connétable d'Armagnac!" Guy de Bar and Jean de Villiers de L'Isle-Adam met them with 5000-6000 men, pushing them back to the entrance of the Bastille. Hector de Saveuse, Jean de Luxembourg-Ligny, and several other Burgundian captains arrived from all directions to lend aid. They were soon strong enough to besiege and take the Bastille, later bestowing command upon Robert de Canni, Lord of Varennes.

Robert de Canni was a personal enemy of Charles, Duke of Orléans, who had seduced and dishonored his wife.

=== Philippe l'Huillier ===
Philippe l'Huillier, Lord of Cailly and Manicamp, was chamberlain to King Louis XI.

=== Jean Bussy-Leclerc ===
Jean Bussy-Leclerc, prosecutor in the Parlement of Paris, was made Captain of the Bastille by the Duke of Guise in 1588 after the Day of the Barricades.

=== Antoine Dumaine Dubourg l'Espinasse ===
Dubourg l'Espinasse or Bourg de Lespinasse or Bourg de l'Espinasse.

In 1588, under Henri III, the Duke of Mayenne had during the Wars of Religion entrusted command of the Bastille to Antoine Dumaine Dubourg l'Espinasse, also known as Antoine du Maine, Baron of the Bourg de Lespinasse. He maintained it until 22 March 1594.

Dubourg surrendered to Henri IV only by capitulation, three days after Paris was surrendered to him by the governor of the city, Charles de Cossé, Duke of Brissac, and once he was certain that the Duke of Mayenne was unable to relieve him. Dubourg had exhausted his provisions and munitions of war; he left the fort "bagne et vie sauve".

The same day Henri IV entrusts command of the Bastille to Devic.

Asked to recognize Henri IV as his king, he replied that he had given his faith to Charles de Mayenne and added that Brissac was a traitor. Indeed, the Governor of Paris had surrendered to Henri IV for 1,695,400 livre.

On 6 March 1597, Dubourg created the Regiment of Bourg de Lespinasse with which he participated in the Siege of Amiens, under orders of Henri IV.

=== Devic ===
There is not much on Devic.

Henri IV entrusted him with command of the Bastille on 22 March 1594, due to the honorable services which he had rendered in its capture. "He was, says the story, a man of rare merit". He was Governor of Saint-Denis before taking the Bastille and will then be Governor of Calais where he died in 1610.

=== Maximilien de Béthune de Sully ===
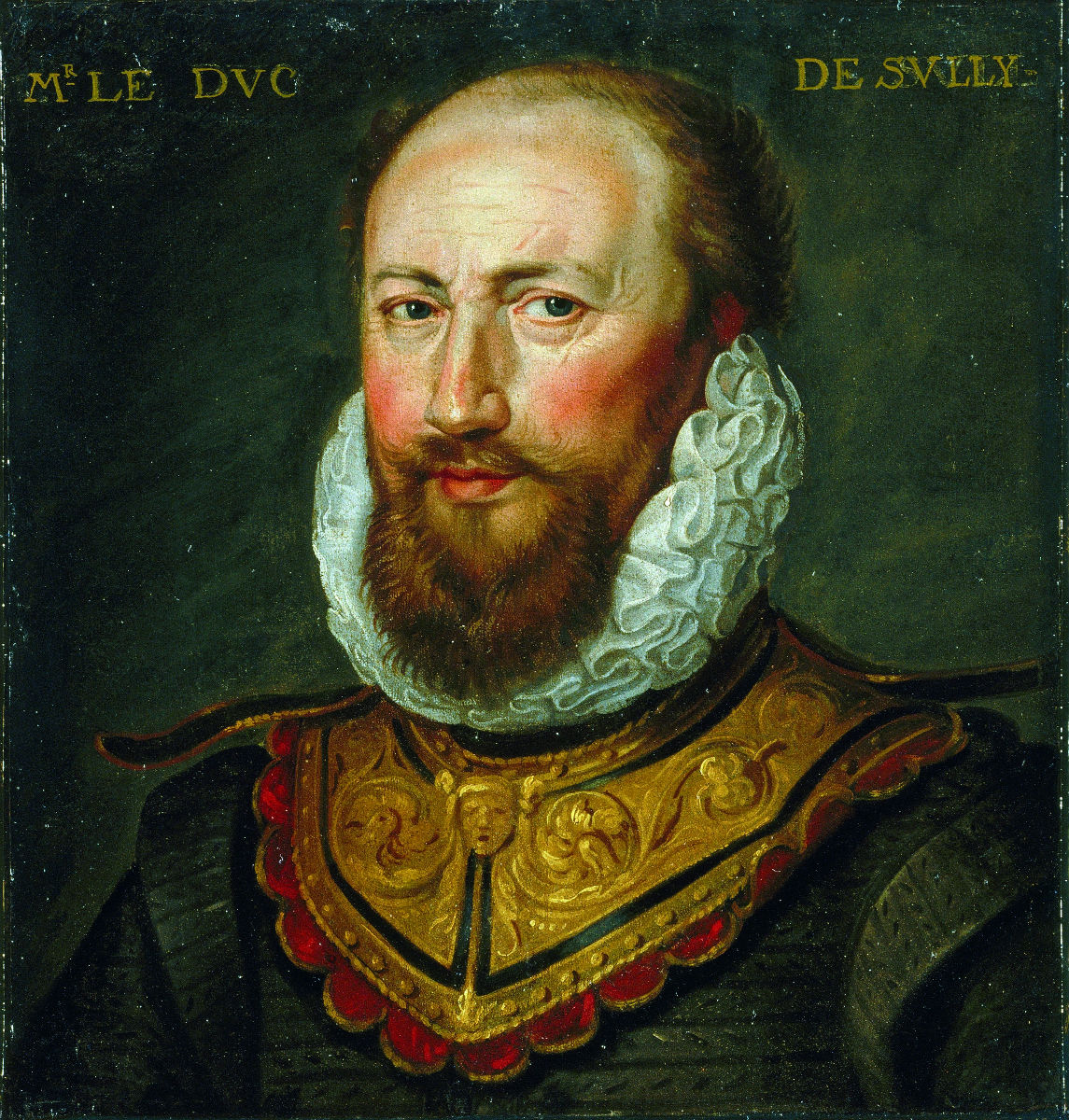
Portrait of the Duke of Sully

In 1601, Maximilian de Bethune, Duke of Sully, Grand Master of the Artillery of France, Grand Voyer of France and Superintendent of Finances is named by Henri IV governor of the Bastille.

It was here that Sully deposited the royal treasure. At the death of Henri IV, in 1610, there were 33,000,000 livre in store. In 1611, Sully returned the governorship of the Bastille to Louis XIII and received a compensation of 60,000 livre.

=== Marie de' Medici (Joachim de Châteauvieux) ===
In 1611, Marie de' Medici became the governess of the Bastille, but entrusted custody to Joachim de Châteauvieux, her knight of honor who took direct command as a lieutenant of the Queen Mother and Regent.

Joachim de Châteauvieux, born on 25 January 1545, son of Claude de Châteauvieux, knight, lord and baron of Fromente, Bailiff of Bresse, and Marie-Salomé de Montchenu, daughter of Marin and Antoinette de Pontbriand.

He was a knight, Baron of Verjon and La Chatre, Count of Confolens, Knight of the Order of the Holy Spirit in 1583, Knight of Honor of Queen Marie de' Medici, Bailiff of Bresse and Bugey, Governor of Burgundy, died without an alliance on 13 January 1615. In 1569, he was captain of the Garde Écossaise and accompanied Henri de Valois, elected in 1573 Rzeczpospolita of Poland–Lithuania under the name Henryk Walezy.

He fought alongside the King during the popular uprising of 12 May 1588.

After the death of Henri III, he served Henri IV and distinguished himself at the Battle of Fontaine-Française.

=== François de Bassompierre ===
François de Bassompierre received, in 1617, the captaincy of the Bastille of Louis XIII. He had sixty Swiss Guards under his command and remained only 8 to 10 days before relinquishing command to the Constable de Luynes.

=== Charles d'Albert ===
After the resignation of Marshal Bassompierre, the constable, Charles Albert, Duke of Luynes, receives, in 1617, the governance of the Bastille. Marie de' Medici having discovered that he was intriguing against her dismissed him after only a few months and handed the post to Vitry.

=== Nicolas de L'Hôpital ===
After the resignation of Marshal Bassompière and the Duke of Luynes, Nicolas de L'Hospital, Duke of Vitry, was the third governor of the Bastille in the year 1617.

The Duke of Vitry was in command when the Marechale d'Ancre, Leonora Dori, was conducted there, as she jailed the murderer of her husband, Concino Concini.

=== Léon d'Albert ===
At the beginning of 1626, the Duke of Vitry ceded command to Leon d'Albert, Marquis de Bréauté, Duke of Piney-Luxembourg, brother of the Constable de Luynes who had been governor of the Bastille nine years earlier.

=== François de L'Hospital ===
On 7 May 1626, François de L'Hospital, lord of the Hallier, brother of Maréchal de Vitry, drove from the Bastille the company of the Duke of Piney-Luxembourg.

His taking office was an event; On 7 May he took command of the fortress at the head of a detachment escorting two new prisoners, the Duke of Modena and Dangent. He immediately dismissed the company established by his predecessor and replaced it with thirty Swiss Guards commanded by the Garde-du-corps.

=== Charles Leclerc du Tremblay ===
Charles Leclerc du Tremblay was appointed by Richelieu as Governor of the Bastille, instead of captain, changing the status of the military citadel to a royal prison.

Under the regency of Anne of Austria the Bastille was besieged once more. On 12 January 1649, after exchanging a few volleys, the fortress fell into the hands of the frondeurs who conferred command upon Louvière Broussel.

Charles Leclerc du Tremblay was the brother of François Leclerc du Tremblay, better known under the name of Father Joseph, the "Grey Eminence" of Richelieu.

=== Louvière Broussel ===
Louviere, or La Louviere, was the son of the Parisian councillor Pierre Broussel.

Pierre Broussel, who played an important role during the War of the Fronde in 1648, had been deprived of his office as governor of the Bastille for his role in the Parlementary Fronde. He then invested his son, Louvière.

During the peace between the Parlement and the King in 1649, it was stipulated that the Bastille would be surrendered to His Majesty on March 11, but this treaty was not confirmed until the following April 1. It was thus agreed that the King would not press delivery of the Bastille, and that Louviere would retain its command. Louvière handed over the Bastille on 21 October 1652, during the Fronde, to La Bachellerie sent by the King.

=== Antoine de Loyac de la Bachellerie ===
Antoine de Loyac, Lord of the Bachellerie, Fage, Lavez and Puy-Donnarel, was the second son of Jean-Baptiste de Loyac and Jeanne de Plaines.

When Louvière handed him the Bastille on 21 October 1652, La Bachellerie did not have the title of Governor of the Bastille. It was by order of the Chancellor that he went with an escort to the assembly of the clergy, sitting at the Grands-Augustins stopped there and led to the Bastille the Abbot of Saint-Jean d'Angély.

On 2 November 1638, Antoine de Loyac, Lord of the Bachellerie, was captain in the Regiment of Montmège.

In 1647, he was a gentleman of the King's Chamber.

In 1653, he is commander of the Île de Ré and Governor of the Bastille.

He married on 1 May 1639 with a young lady, Gabrielle de Maruc, daughter of Annet de Maruc, squire, Lord of Charbonnier and Gabrielle de Gibanel, with whom he had:

- Jean-Baptiste de Loyac, squire, Lord of the Bachellerie and Fage captain of a company in the Regiment of Picardy
- Jean-Noel de Loyac, squire, Lord of the Puy-Donnarel who married on May 31, 1675, Catherine de Maruc
- Antoine de Loyac, squire, Lord of Malaret, Captain in the Regiment of Picardy
- Charles de Loyac, squire, Lord of the Fage, lieutenant in the Regiment of Picardy
- Anne de Loyac, legatee of her father for the sum of 20,000 livre

=== François de Montlezun ===
François de Montlezun, lord of Besmaux was captain of the guards of Cardinal Mazarin and obtained his brevet of governor in 1658.

François de Monlezun, Lord of Besmaux kept this lucrative and respectable post for more than forty years. He largely succeeded in compensating himself for the payment of 90,000 francs, the price of his predecessor's resignation.

He died at his post on 18 December 1697, 88 years old and buried in Carmes-Déchaux.

In the second volume of the Vicomte de Bragelonne, Alexandre Dumas introduces the character of the Governor of the Bastille under the name of Baisemeaux de Montlezun.

=== Bénigne Dauvergne de Saint-Mars ===
Bénigne Dauvergne de Saint-Mars was appointed Governor of the Bastille in 1698. He arrived there on 18 September with the Man in the Iron Mask and his lieutenant, Durosarge.

Durosarge and Saint-Mars had since 1671 kept this prisoner at Pignerol and then, this fortress having been returned to the King of Sardinia, had relocated to Île Sainte-Marguerite, where he had by order built a prison.

The diary of Dujonca, major of the Bastille, indicates:

"From Thursday, 18 September 1698, at three o'clock in the afternoon, Monsieur de Saint-Mars, Governor of the Bastille, coming from his command of the Île Sainte-Marguerite, brought with him a prisoner whom he had at Pignerol, who is still masked and whose name is not said."

Five years later, on 19 November 1703, Lieutenant Durosarge signed the Act of Interment of this prisoner whose name and motive of imprisonment no one knew.

Dujonca's diary reads:

"From Monday, 19 November 1703, the unknown prisoner, always masked by a black velvet he had been keeping for a long time, found himself a little ill yesterday after leaving Mass. He died today at ten o'clock in the evening, without having had a great illness."

Governor Saint-Mars died at his post on 18 September 1708.

=== Charles le Fournier de Bernaville ===
Charles le Fournier de Bernaville passed from the lieutenance of the Château de Vincennes to governance of the Bastille after the death of Saint-Mars on 12 March 1708.

Le Fournier had successively been a valet de chambre, secretary of the Maréchal de Bellefonds, and governor of the dungeon of Vincennes. His services earned him the epaulets of the lieutenant du roi and the title of Chevalier de Bernaville. It is under this name that he made himself famous for his greed and ferocity.

He died at his post on 8 December 1718, at the age of 74.

=== René Jourdan de Launay ===
René Jourdan de Launay was governor of the Bastille in 1718.

Born in Golleville on 2 June 1673, he was a squire, Lord of Launay, Bretonnière, Hennodière, Mesnil and La Motte, Lord of the Varengère (1746), and knight of the Royal and Military Order of Saint Louis.

He was first married in 1721 to Catherine Charlotte Sevin de Quincy, daughter of General Charles Sevin de Quincy and Genevieve Pecquot de Saint-Maurice, who died on 27 February 1736 at the age of 36 years.

On 12 April 1736, he married Charlotte Renée Aubry d'Armanville, Lady of Issy and Pourpry, with whom he had Bernard René Jourdan de Launay; who was to become the final governor of the Bastille.

He died suddenly in 1749, aged 76, near Saint Benoit in Paris while leaving Madame Beuclerc's home.

=== Pierre Baisle ===
Pierre Baisle was appointed Governor of the Bastille on 6 August 1749.

He was a Bordeaux man exempt from the Garde-du-corps, captain of the Regiment of Champagne and lieutenant du roi at the Château de Vincennes.

He died at his post on 5 December 1758.

=== François-Jérôme d'Abadie ===
François-Jérôme d'Abadie born in Grenade-en-Marsan, former captain in the Regiment of Piedmont having the rank of colonel, and lieutenant du roi in the Bastille since 1 December 1750, was appointed governor on 8 December 1758 and succeeded Pierre Baisle.

A Governor of the Bastille was subordinate to the Lieutenant-General of Police. He could do nothing without the express order of the magistrate, and Francois-Jerome d'Abadie thought himself obliged to take the orders of the Chief of Police before allowing a prisoner to shave.

A prisoner bothered by his long beard had asked the Governor to allow him to shave. The Governor had ordered Major Chevalier to write to the Chief of Police. A copy of Chevalier's pleading on 31 May 1756:

"Monsieur Pizzoni asks to write to you; we await your orders accordingly. This prisoner has nothing to wear, we lend him the store, chemises, handkerchiefs, bonnets, nightclothes and slippers. Monsieur Pizzoni has been here since the 17th; he has not yet been shaved, he asks in favor of it. I have the honor ... "

The Lieutenant of Police replied in the margin on 3 June 1756:

"I would like him to write to me and shave him".

François-Jérôme d'Abadie died on 18 May 1761 and was succeeded by Antoine-Joseph de Jumilhac.

=== Antoine-Joseph de Jumilhac ===
After the death of Abadie in 1761, it was Antoine-Joseph-Marie Macosi de Jumilhac, First Gentleman of Stanisław Leszczyński, Duke of Lorraine and Bar, that succeeded to governance.

Major Chevalier still officiated in 1771. On September 13, he wrote to the Lieutenant-General of Police:

"The head of Monsieur La Riviere is always heated and I begin to despair that his poor head may not heal without the remedy ... With profound respect ... "

On the sidelines the magistrate wrote: "To hang"

=== Bernard-René Jourdan de Launay ===
Bernard-Rene Jourdan de Launay was the last Governor of the Bastille and took his post in October 1776. He paid Jumilhac 300,000 livres for his post as governor.

The Marquis de Launay was born in the Bastille in 1740. His father, René Jourdan de Launay, had already been governor for twelve years and died there nine years after his birth. He was a Black Musketeer of the King, officer in the Gardes Françaises until 1763–1764, then captain of a cavalry regiment.

During the Storming of the Bastille on 14 July 1789, De Launay was arrested and escorted to the town hall by one of the leaders of the Revolution, Pierre-Augustin Hulin. In the Place de Greve the furious crowd attacked the escort, assaulting and eventually beheading Governor Launay.

=== Prosper Soulès ===
After the capture of the fortress, Prosper Soulès assumed the interim duties of acting commander.

== Bibliography ==
- Charpentier, La Bastille dévoilée, 1789;
- Jules de Gaulle, Nouvelle Histoire de Paris et de ses environs, (notes et introduction par Charles Nodier, de l'Académie française), Paris, Pourrat frères éditeurs, 1839, tome II;
- Félix et Louis Lazare, Dictionnaire administratif et historique des rues de Paris et de ses monuments, Paris, 1844;
- Fernand Bournon, La Bastille, histoire et description, Paris, Imprimerie Nationale, 1893;
- Frantz Funck-Brentano, La Bastille, histoire et description des bâtiments, administration, régime de la prison, événements historiques, Bibliothèque de l'École des chartes, vol. 55, No. 55, Paris, 1894;
- Dufey, La Bastille; Mémoires pour servir à l'histoire secrète du gouvernement Français.
