= Sabre de cuirassier modèle An IX =

Sabre modèle An IX
- Type: Heavy cavalry sabre
- Place of origin: France

Service history
- Wars: Napoleonic Wars

Production history
- Designer: Liorard
- Designed: An VIII (1799 - 1800)
- Manufacturer: Klingenthal
- No. built: 15 199

Specifications
- Blade type: curved, 97.45 cm (38.37 in) long, flat

The Sabre de cuirassier modèle An IX (lit. 'Cuirassier saber, model of the ninth year') or the Sabre modèle An IX (lit. 'sabre, model of the ninth year') was a standard cavalry sabre in usage in the French Army during the Napoleonic Wars.

== Significance ==
The modèle An IX was the first attempt at standardising cavalry sabres after the French Revolution, during which a disorganised plethora of bladed weapons was produced. It comes as a successor of the sabre of the elite Garde du Corps.
