= Gardes du Corps du Roi (France) =

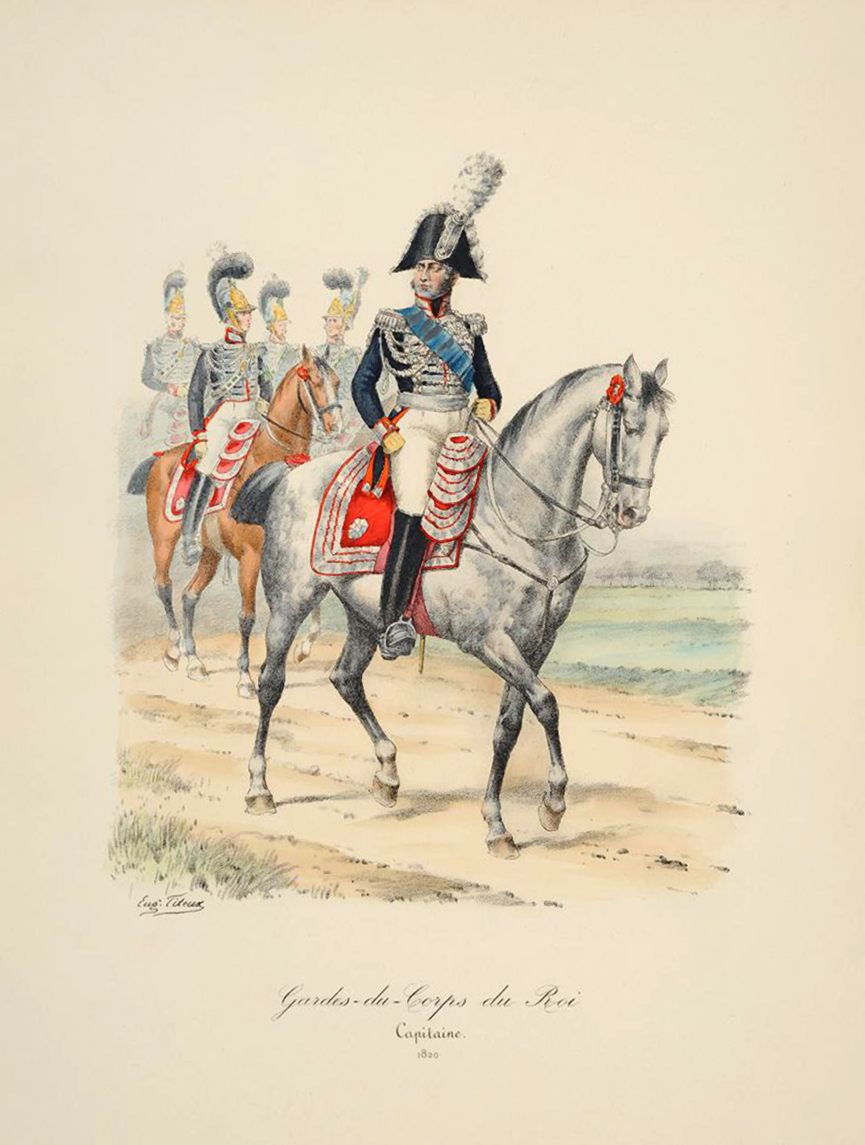
- Troops of the Gardes du Corps du Roi in 1820
- Founded: 1423
- Disbanded: 1830
- Country: Kingdom of France; Kingdom of France
- Part of: Maison militaire du roi de France
- Mottos: Latin: Erit haec quoque cognita monstris Latin: Nec pluribus impar
- Engagements: Hundred Years' War Italian Wars: Battle of Fornovo; Battle of Pavia; War of the Austrian Succession: Battle of Fontenoy; Battle of Lauffeld; French Revolution: Women's March on Versailles; July Revolution

The Gardes du Corps du Roi (French pronunciation: [ɡaʁd dy kɔʁ dy ʁwa]) was a cavalry unit of the maison militaire du roi de France.

== History ==
=== Foundation ===
The oldest unit in the Garde du Corps was the Company of Scottish Archers, later just the 1st Scottish Company or Garde Écossaise, formed in 1419 from Scots that fought for the French during Hundred Years' War. This unit was created at an uncertain date between 1423 and 1448. Subsequently, two further French companies were raised. A final company was established on 17 March 1515. Each of the four companies initially numbered less than a hundred men.

=== Active service ===
In the Battle of Fornovo during the Italian Wars the Garde du Corps saved King Charles VIII from being captured by enemy forces. Later in the Italian Wars they failed to save Francis I from being captured in the Battle of Pavia.

The last time the Garde du Corps campaigned was during the War of the Austrian Succession because it only went on campaign when the king was present. The last battle in which the Garde du Corps was present was Lauffeld on 1 July 1747.

=== Composition and military quality ===
In contrast to other units of the royal household such as the French Guards and the Swiss Guards, the Garde du Corps was an exclusively aristocratic corps. Even the rank and file were drawn from families with appropriate social backgrounds. As such they were noted for their courtly manners but less so for their professionalism and military skills.

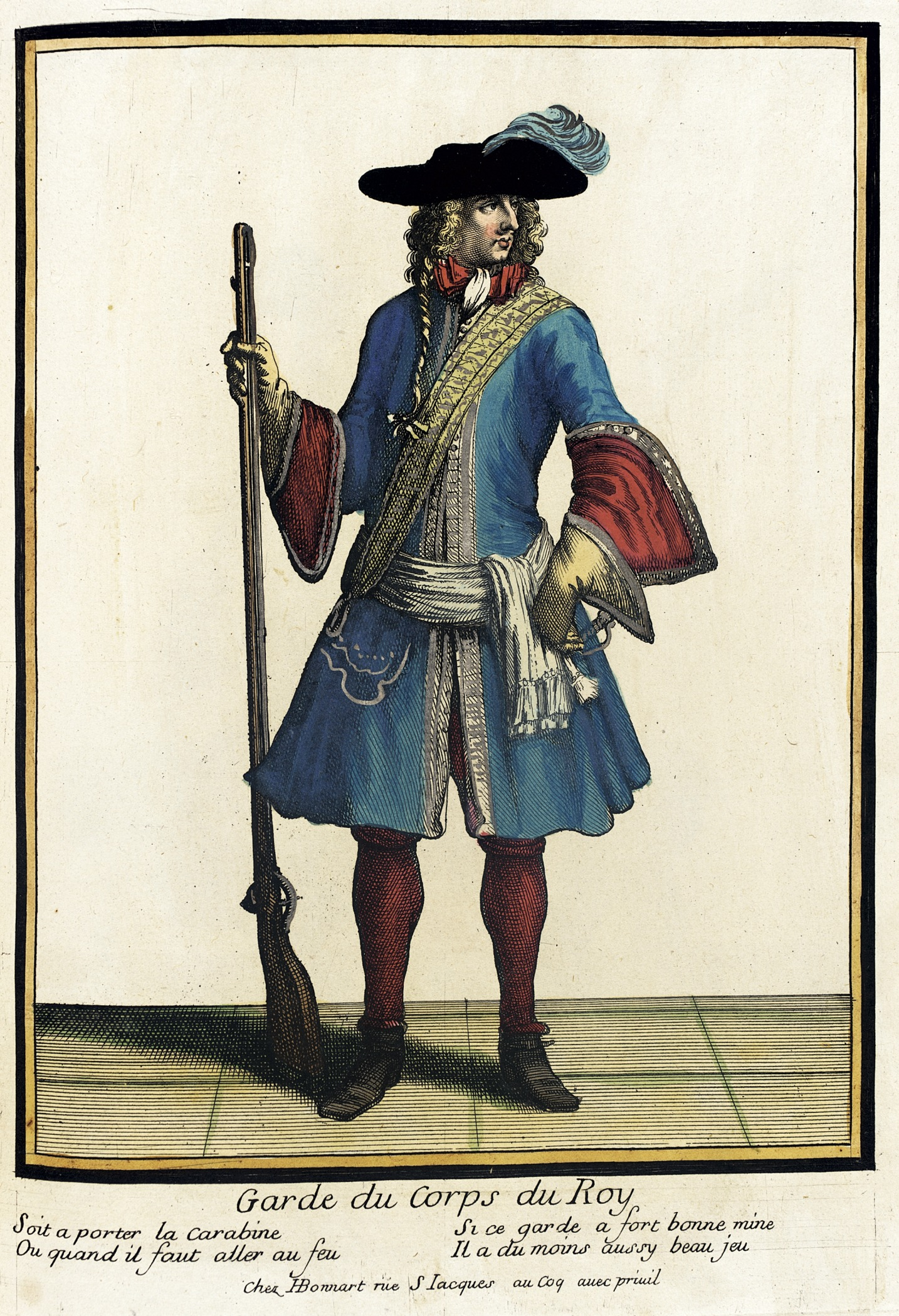
Guardsman, ca. 1685

Individual courtier guardsmen stationed at Versailles were not subject to regular training beyond ceremonial drill, and extended periods of leave from duty were common. A critical report, dated 1775, concluded that the Garde du Corps and other "distinguished units with their own privileges are always very expensive - fight less than line troops, are usually badly disciplined and badly trained, and are always very embarrassing on campaign". Officers of the Garde du Corps resented having to wear uniforms (perceived as a form of servant's livery) when on duty at Versailles and eventually won the concession of appearing in civilian court dress with their military belts and swords, except when on parade.

=== Revolution and Restoration ===
The Garde du Corps featured conspicuously in several incidents in the opening stages of the French Revolution. On 1 October 1789 the officers of the Garde hosted a banquet to welcome their colleagues of the Régiment de Flandre (Flanders Regiment); a line infantry regiment of the Royal Army, which had been brought to Versailles to replace the disbanded Gardes Francais (French Guards). The latter regiment had joined in the attack on the Bastille six weeks before. The banquet was reported in Paris as a royalist provocation and an angry crowd of thousands marched on Versailles. During the night of 5 October about 500 members of the crowd broke into the palace, killing two of the Gardes du Corps on duty. Other Gardes du Corps held the doors to the royal apartments until grenadiers of the National Guard – mostly former Gardes Francais – restored order. The Garde du Corps narrowly escaped massacre and, disarmed, was obliged to accompany the Royal Family to Paris. Most of this aristocratic regiment then dispersed to their estates or into exile.

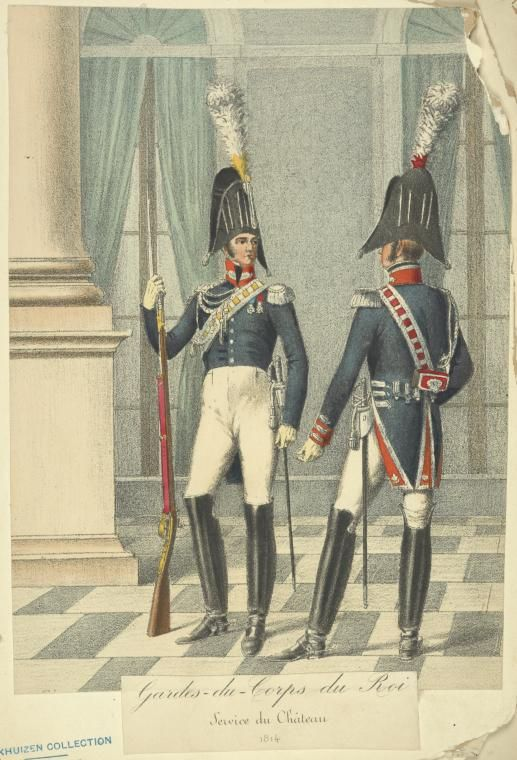
Soldiers of the Garde-du-Corps du Roi, ca. 1814.

The Garde du Corps was formally dissolved in 1791 along with all of the Maison du Roi, except for the ill-fated Swiss Guards. After the abdication of Napoleon I in April 1814 and the Bourbon Restoration, Louis XVIII recreated the Garde du Corps with the rest of the Maison du Roi. These units disappeared during Napoleon's return, at the start of the Hundred Days.

After Waterloo and the return of the Bourbons the Garde du Corps was recreated again, almost the only unit of the old Maison du Roi to be given a further chance after the disappointing performance of these expensive and militarily obsolete regiments in 1815. The Garde du Corps was however reorganised, reduced in numbers to about 1,500 and integrated more closely with the regular army. The reconstituted Garde du Corps served the returned Bourbons loyally until being finally abolished, along with all Guard units, by Louis-Philippe I in 1830 after the July Revolution.

== Motto ==
The original motto of the Garde du Corps was Erit haec quoque cognita monstris (They will be recognized, them also, with their brilliant deeds), but during the reign of Louis XIV it changed to Nec pluribus impar (No unequal match for many (suns)), which also was Louis XIV's personal motto.

The swords of the guardsmen were inscribed with Vive le Roi (Long live the King).

== Organization ==
The number of guardsmen increased between the reign of Francis I and that of Louis XIV from 400 to 1,600 men. In the eighteenth century, the numbers eventually stabilized at around 1,500 men.

In 1737, each company had 320 men, organized into two squadrons and six brigades.

=== 1st Scottish Company (Garde Écossaise) ===
1st Company
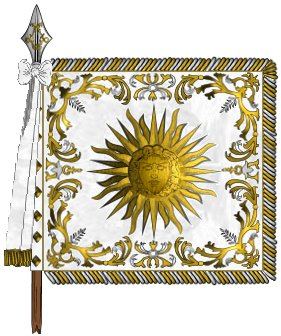
- Standard of the 1st Company of the Gardes-du-Corps du Roi
- Founded: 1440; Established by Charles VII
- Disbanded: 11 August 1830; July Revolution
- Part of: Garde-du-Corps du Roi
- Nickname: Garde Écossaise
- Colors: White and Gold

Despite the name, by the 16th century the company had ceased to be purely Scottish. Little by little the Scottish Company became Scottish in name only.

Captains/Chefs de corps:

- 1440 : Robert Patilloch
- 1449 : Mathieu d'Harcourt, Lord of Rugny
- 1455 : Claude de Châteauneuf, Garde-du-Corps of Charles VII of France
- 1456 : Michel de Beauvilliers, seigneur de La Ferte-Hubert, du Lude et de Thoury
- 1462 : William Stuyers
- 1466 : Thomas Stuyers
- 1471 : Geffrey Coowran
- 1473 : Robert Coningham
- 1480 : Jean Coningham
- 1495-1508 : Bernard Stewart (1452-1508), Duke of Aubigny
- 1508-1512 : John Stewart ( † 1512), seigneur d'Henrichemont
- 1512 : Robert Stewart (1570-1544), Duke of Aubigny, Maréchal de France (1515)
- 1514-1544 : Jean Stuart ( † 1551), sieur de Vézinnes et de Fontaine
- 1544 : Jacques I de Montgomery (vers 1485–1560), seigneur de Lorges
- 1557 : Gabriel I de Montgommery (vers 1530–1574), seigneur de Lorges
- 1559 : Jacques II de Montgommery ( † 1562), seigneur de Lorges
- 1562-1563 : Jean I d'O (vers 1510-vers 1578), seigneur de Maillebois
- 1563-1569 : Jean de Losse, écuyer, seigneur de Bannes
- 1569-1599 : Joachim de Châteauvieux (1545-1615), Governor of the Bastille
- 1599-1605 : Jean-Paul d'Esparbès de Lussan ( † 1616), seigneur de La Serre, chevalier du Saint-Esprit
- 1605-1611 : Antoine Arnaud de Pardaillan de Gondrin (1562-1624), marquis de Montespan, chevalier du Saint-Esprit
- 1611-1612 : Philibert de Nerestang ( † 1620), marquis de Nerestang
- 1612-1616 : Charles d'Estournel, seigneur de Blainville
- 1616-1623 : Charles de La Vieuville (1583-1653), marquis de de La Vieuville
- 1623-1642 : Guillaume de Simiane ( † 1642), marquis de Gordes (février 1615), chevalier du Saint-Esprit;
- 1642-1642 : François de Simiane (vers 1622–1680), marquis de Gordes
- 1642-1651 : François de Rochechouart (1611-1696), comte de Limoges (1661), marquis de Chandenier
- 1651 : Anne de Noailles (1620-1678), Duke of Noailles
- 1678 : Anne Jules de Noailles (1650-1708), comte d'Ayen, Duke of Noailles, Maréchal de France (1693)
- 1707 : Adrien Maurice de Noailles (1678-1766), Duke of Noailles, Maréchal de France (1734)
- 1731 : Louis de Noailles (1713-1793), Duke of Ayen, Duke of Noailles, Maréchal de France (1775)
- 1758-1791 : Jean-Paul de Noailles (1739-1824), Duke of Ayen, Duke of Noailles
- 1814-1825 : Joseph Anne Maximilien de Croÿ d'Havré (1744-1839)
- 1825-1830 : Emmanuel Marie Maximilien de Croÿ-Solre (1768-1848)

=== 2nd Company (1st French Company) ===
2nd Company
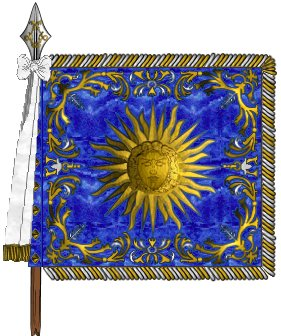
- Standard of the 2nd Company of the Gardes-du-Corps du Roi
- Founded: 4 September 1474; Established by Louis XI
- Disbanded: 11 August 1830; July Revolution
- Part of: Garde-du-Corps du Roi
- Garrison/HQ: Coulommiers
- Nicknames: Gentlemen with the Beak of Corbin; Hundred Spears; 1st French Company
- Colors: Green and Gold

Louis XI, by edict of 4 September 1474, had instituted for the custody of his person a company of 100 French men-at-arms, under the command of Hector de Galard. This troop was for a long time known under the nickname of gentilshommes au bec de corbin, because they carried a balanced ax on its handle by a bent tip.

Each of these gentlemen was to maintain at his own expense two archers. By letters patent given at Rouen on 10 June 1475, the King exempted these gentlemen from the maintenance of the archers; he took them in his pay and formed a special company, which he entrusted to Jean Blosset, Lord of Plessis-Pate. This company of archers was called la petite garde du roi, to distinguish it from the 1st Company (Scottish Guard) which was officially designated under the title of Cent lances des gentilshommes de l’hôtel du Roy, ordered for the guard his person, that is, his escort.

The petite garde served on foot and horseback.

It is this petite garde, transformed by Francis I in the company of 100 men-at-arms, which became in 1515, the 1st French Company of the Garde-du-Corps. This company distinguished itself from others, from the reign of Louis XIV, by the blue color of its banners and shoulder straps.

The company held quarters at Coulommiers and served at Versailles the quarter of April.

Captains/Chefs de corps:

- 1474 : Hector de Galard de Brassac (1415-1475), chambellan de Louis XI
- 1475 : Jean Blosset du Plessis-Pâté († avant 1500), baron de Torcy
- 1477 : Hervé de Chalnay
- 1482 : Jacques de Silly (1450-1503), seigneur de Launay et de Vaulx, chambellan de Charles VIII, bailli et capitaine de Caen, grand maître de l'artillerie de France
- 1482 : Jacques Ier de Crussol, vicomte d'Uzès
- 1524 : Louis II Mitte de Miolans de Chevrières († 1529), seigneur de Chevrières, sénéchal du Bourbonnais (1525), et bailli de Gévaudan (1528)
- 1530 : Antoine de Raffin, seigneur de Puycalvary, de Beaucaire et d'Azay-le-Rideau, Governor of Cherbourg, Marmande and La Sauvetat
- 1551 : Louis de Talaru, seigneur de Chalmazel
- 1570 : Eustache de Conflans, vicomte d'Ouchy (vers 1526–1574), Governor of Saint-Quentin, chevalier du Saint-Esprit, distinguished at Surprise of Meaux and Battle of Saint-Denis (1567)
- 1574 : Nicolas d'Angennes (1533-1611), marquis de Rambouillet, vidame du Mans, chevalier du Saint-Esprit
- 1580 : Jean d'O, sieur de Manou, chevalier du Saint-Esprit
- 1595 : Louis de L'Hôpital († 1611), marquis de Vitry, chevalier du Saint-Esprit
- 1611 : Nicolas de L'Hospital, marquis de Vitry
- 1617 : François de L'Hospital, marquis du Hallier
- 1631 : Charles de Lévis-Charlus (1600-1662), marquis de Château-Renault
- 1634 : Louis de Béthune (1605-1681), Duke of Chârost (1672), maréchal de camp, lieutenant-général des ville et citadelle de Calais, chevalier du Saint-Esprit
- 1648 : René du Plessis de Jarzé, marquis de Jarzé (1613-1676), le Beau Jarzé
- 1649 : Louis de Béthune (1605-1681), Duke of Chârost
- 1663 : Louis Armand de Béthune-Chârost (1640-1717), Duke of Chârost, chevalier du Saint-Esprit.
- 1672 : Jacques Henri de Durfort de Duras (1652-1704), Duke of Duras, Maréchal de France, chevalier du Saint-Esprit
- 1704 : Louis-François de Boufflers (1644-1711), Duke of Boufflers
- 1711 : Armand I de Béthune-Chârost (1663-1747), Duke of Chârost, baron d'Ancenis
- 1747 : Paul François de Béthune-Chârost (1682-1759), Duke of Chârost
- 1756 : Gaston Pierre de Lévis (1699-1757), Duke of Mirepoix
- 1757 : Charles Juste de Beauvau, Prince of Craon (1720-1793), prince de Beauvau
- 1784 : Philippe Louis de Noailles (1752-1819), prince de Poix, Duke of Mouchy
- 1790 : Charles-Anne des Escotais (1772-1822), comte des Escotais

=== 3rd Company (2nd French Company) ===
3rd Company
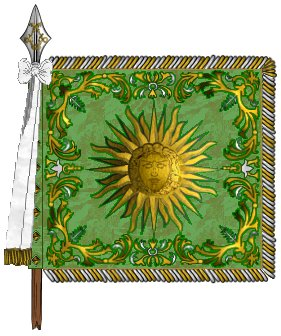
- Standard of the 3rd Company of the Gardes-du-Corps du Roi
- Founded: 1479; Established by Louis XI
- Disbanded: 11 August 1830; July Revolution
- Part of: Garde-du-Corps du Roi
- Nickname: 2nd French Company
- Colors: Blue and Gold

Louis XI, satisfied with the services of his petits gardes of the 1st French Company, created in 1479 a second similar company, and gave the command to Claude de La Chatre.

It became, like the previous one, a company of bodyguards at the beginning of the reign of Francis I.

Captains/Chefs de corps:

- 1479 : Claude de La Châtre de Nançay, seigneur de Nançay
- 1490 : Abel de La Châtre
- 1499 : Gabriel de La Châtre, baron de La Maisonfort, seigneur de Nançay
- 1529 : Joachim de La Châtre, baron de La Maisonfort
- 1549 : François, seigneur de La Ferté, gentilhomme ordinaire de la Chambre du Roi
- ???? : Gaspard de La Châtre (vers 1539–1576), seigneur de Nançay
- 1580 : Charles de Balsac, seigneur de Clermont (vers 1565–1610), baron d’Entragues
- 1590 : François du Plessis (1548-1590), Provost Marshal of France, conseiller d'État
- 1590 : Charles de Choiseul, marquis de Praslin (1563-1626), Maréchal de France
- 1611: René Potier (1579-1670), Duke of Tresmes
- 1635 : Louis Potier de Gesvres (1612-1645), marquis de Gesvres
- 1643 : François Potier de Gesvres (1612-1646), marquis de Gesvres
- 1646 : Léon Potier (vers 1620–1704), Duke of Gesvres

Lauzun, who lost in 1669 the position of Colonel General of the Dragoons, received that of captain of this company, thanks to the support (or the passion which it devotes to him) of Anne Marie Louise d'Orléans, Duchess of Montpensier, who not only obtained the approval of the King, but paid this charge 750,000 livres to the Duke of Gesvres.

- 1646 : Antoine Nompar de Caumont (1633-1723), Duke of Lauzun
- 1673 : François-Henri de Montmorency (1628-1695), Duke of Piney, Maréchal de France
- 1693 : François de Neufville (1664-1730), Duke of Villeroy, Maréchal de France
- 1708 : Louis Nicolas de Neufville (1663-1734), Duke of Villeroy
- 1734 : Louis François Anne de Neufville (1695-1766), Duke of Villeroy
- 1758 : Gabriel Louis François de Neufville (1731-1794), Duke of Villeroy
- 1791-1830 : Antoine-Louis-Marie de Gramont (1755-1836), Duke of Gramont

=== 4th Company (3rd French Company) ===
4th Company
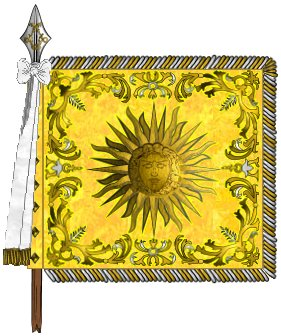
- Standard of the 4th Company of the Gardes-du-Corps du Roi
- Founded: 1516; Established by Francis I
- Disbanded: 11 August 1830; July Revolution
- Part of: Garde-du-Corps du Roi
- Garrison/HQ: Dreux
- Nickname: 3rd French Company
- Colors: Gold

Upon his accession to the throne, Francis I possessed a company which was commanded by a lieutenant-captain, Raoul de Vernon, Lord of Montreuilbouyn. He also had a personal guard commanded by Louis Leroy de Chavigny. Wishing to have five companies of the bodyguards, all organized on the foot of the Scottish company, he transformed in 1515, as it was said above, the two companies of archers of the small guard of Louis XI, and added two others trained with his personal guards and with detachments of companies of archers of Crussol and La Chatre.

In 1545 he remodeled the organization of the bodyguards, and he kept only four companies. The 4th company had its yellow flags, shoulder straps and crews. She served the Court from October 1 to December 31, and was usually quartered in Dreux.

Captains/Chefs de corps:

- 1553 : Louis d'Humières de Contay
- 1557 : Philippe de Maillé-Brézé, vicomte de Verneuil
- 1575 : Nicolas de La Haulle, seigneur de Grémonville
- 1592 : Jacques-Nompar de Caumont, Duke of La Force
- 1632-1651 : Antoine d'Aumont de Rochebaron, Duke of Aumont, marquis de Villequier, Captain of the Gardes-du-Corps of Louis XIII
- 1651-1669 : Louis Marie Victor d'Aumont de Rochebaron, Duke of Aumont, marquis de Villequier, Captain of the Gardes-du-Corps of Louis XIV
- 1669-1675 : Henri Louis d'Aloigny, marquis de Rochefort, Captain of the Garde-du-Corps of Louis XIV
- 1676-1696 : Guy Aldonce II de Durfort, comte de Lorges, Duke of Quintin, Maréchal de France (1676)
- 1696-1702 : Guy Nicolas de Durfort, Duke of Lorges
- 1703-1718 : Henry d'Harcourt, Duke of Harcourt
- 1718-1750 : François d'Harcourt, Duke of Harcourt
- 1750-1764 : Charles II Frédéric de Montmorency, Duke of Piney-Luxembourg
- 1764-1784 : Charles François Christian de Montmorency-Luxembourg, prince de Tingry
- 1784-1790 : Anne Paul Emmanuel Sigismond de Montmorency-Luxembourg, prince de Luxembourg
- 1790-1790 : Anne Christian de Montmorency-Luxembourg, Duke of Beaumont
- 1815 : Pierre Louis François Paultre de Lamotte (1774-1840), maréchal de camp, commandant of the 4th Company of the Gardes-du-Corps (Luxembourg)

== Gardes de la Manche ==
The Gardes de la Manche (English: Guards of the Sleeve) was an elite detachment formed as the king's personal guard by Charles VII with men from the Company of Scottish Archers. They were the 24 oldest men of the 1st Scottish Company. The name came from the fact that they stood so close to the king as to be brushed by his sleeves. In 1775 this guard was reduced to 18 men. The captain of the Garde de La Manche was called the First Man-at-arms of France.

A less successful bodyguard was The Forty-Five, recruited by the Duke of Épernon to provide Henry III of France with protection in the midst of the War of the Three Henrys. They served Henry III and Henry IV of France, but were unable to prevent both monarchs being assassinated.

== Gallery ==
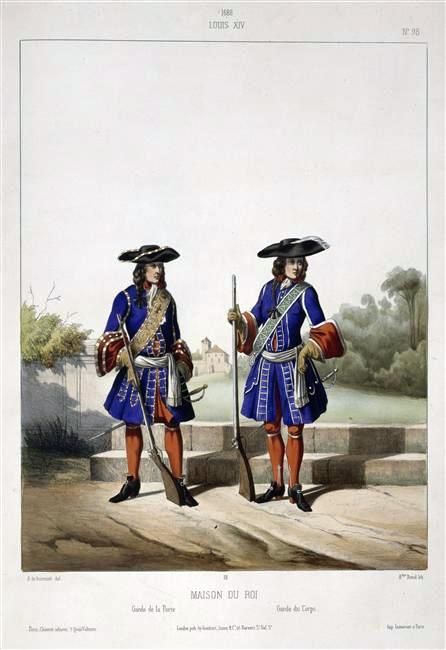
Maison du Roi, Louis XIV, 1688 (Garde de la Porte and Garde du Corps)

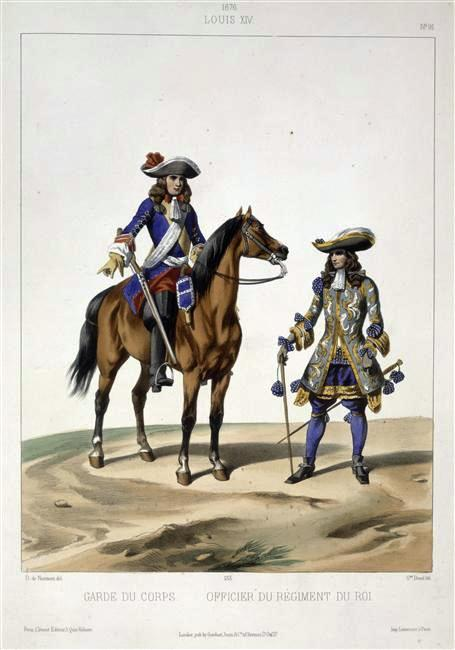
Garde du corps and an officer of the régiment du Roi, Louis XIV, 1676

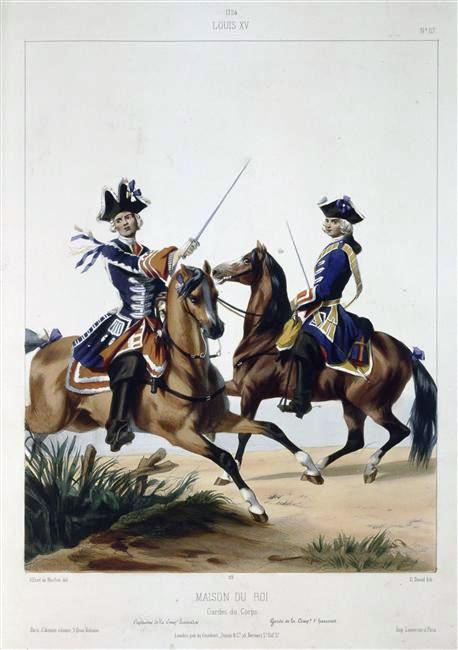
Maison du Roi, Louis XV, 1724 : Gardes du Corps

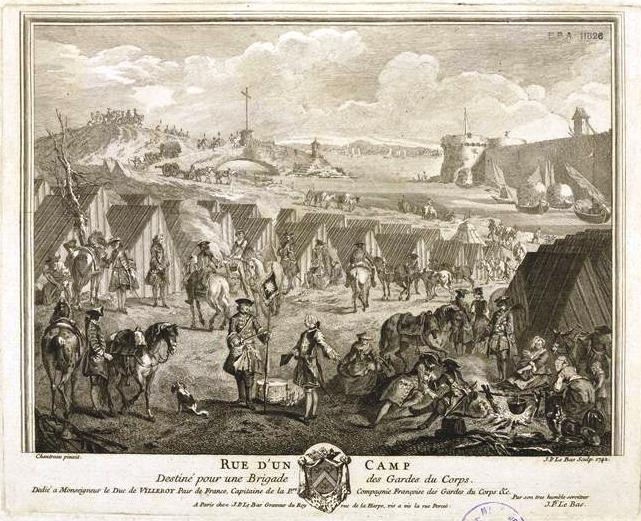
Encampment of the Guard, 1742

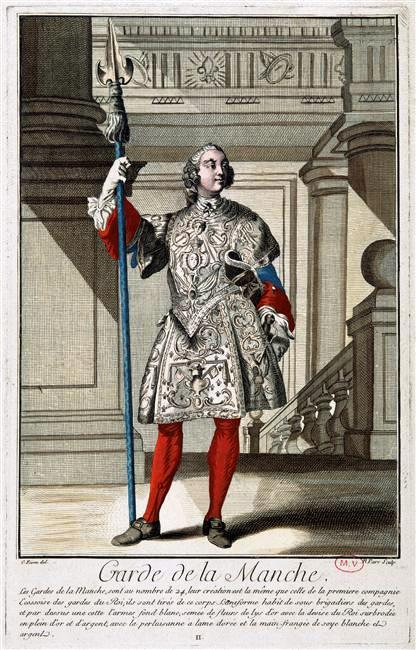
Garde de la Manche (Louis XV)

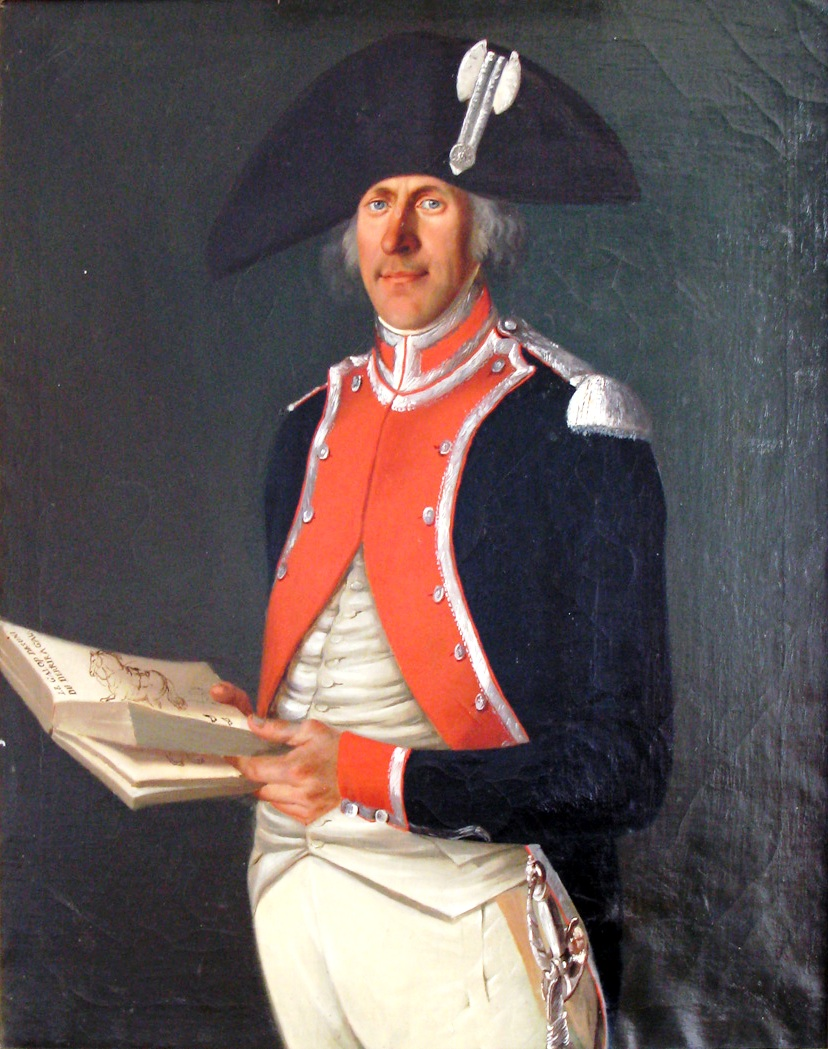
Charles de Riberolles (1752-1827), Garde du corps of Louis XV and Louis XVI

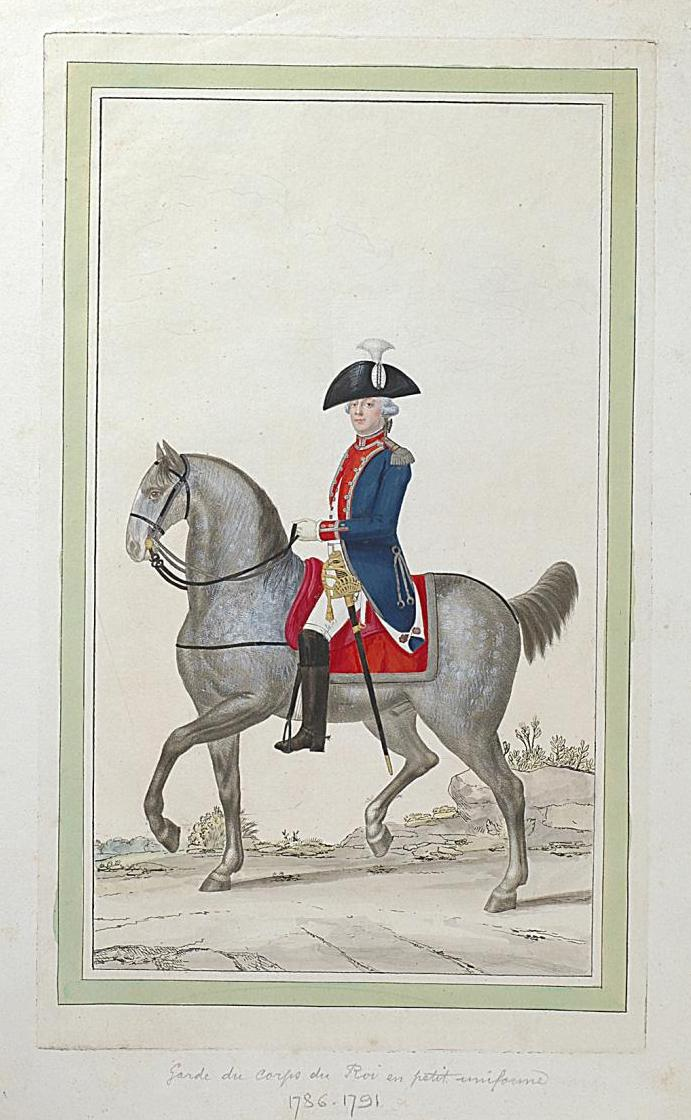
Garde du Corps of the King in undress uniform 1786-1791

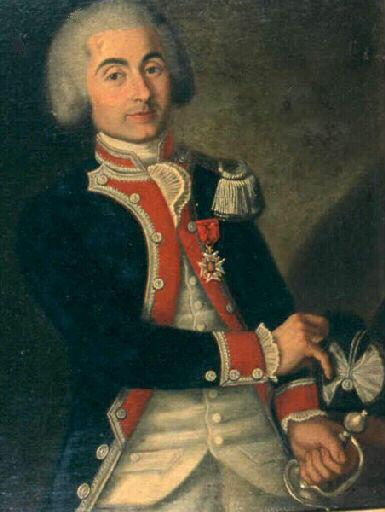
Louis-François-Joseph de Ferre (ou Ferry) du Pommier (1755-1833)

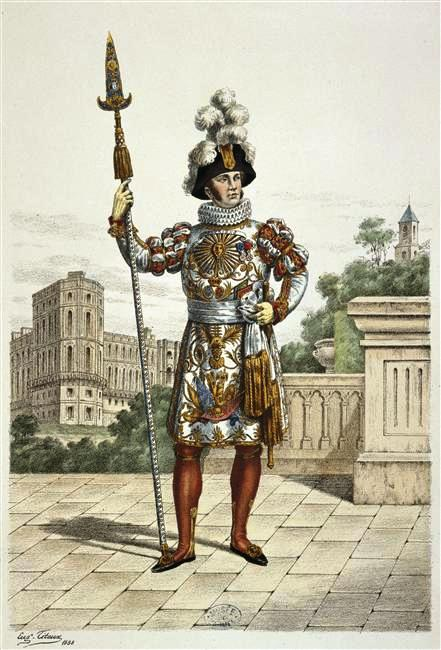
Garde de la Manche, 1814-1830

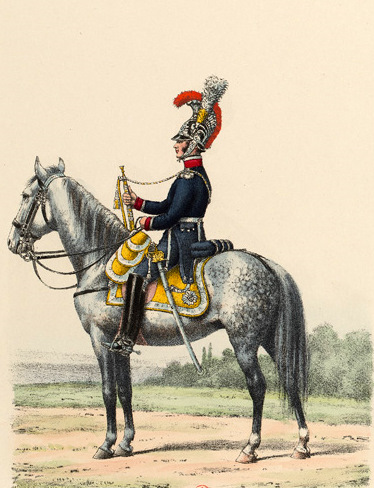
Mounted trumpeter of the Guard, 1815

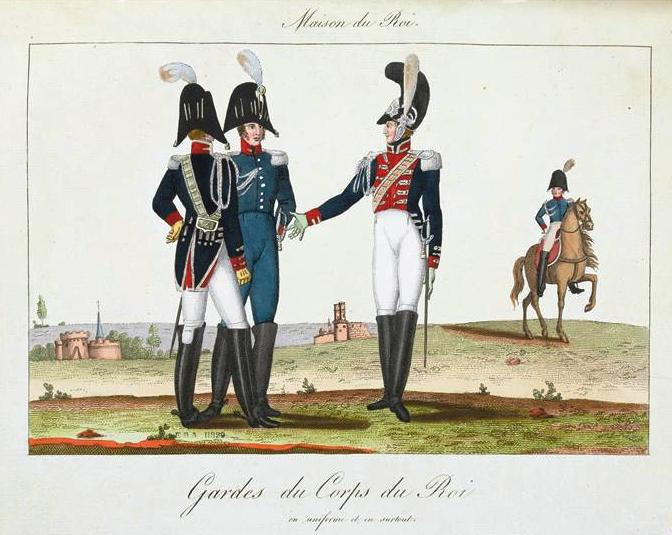
Guardsmen of the Restoration Period

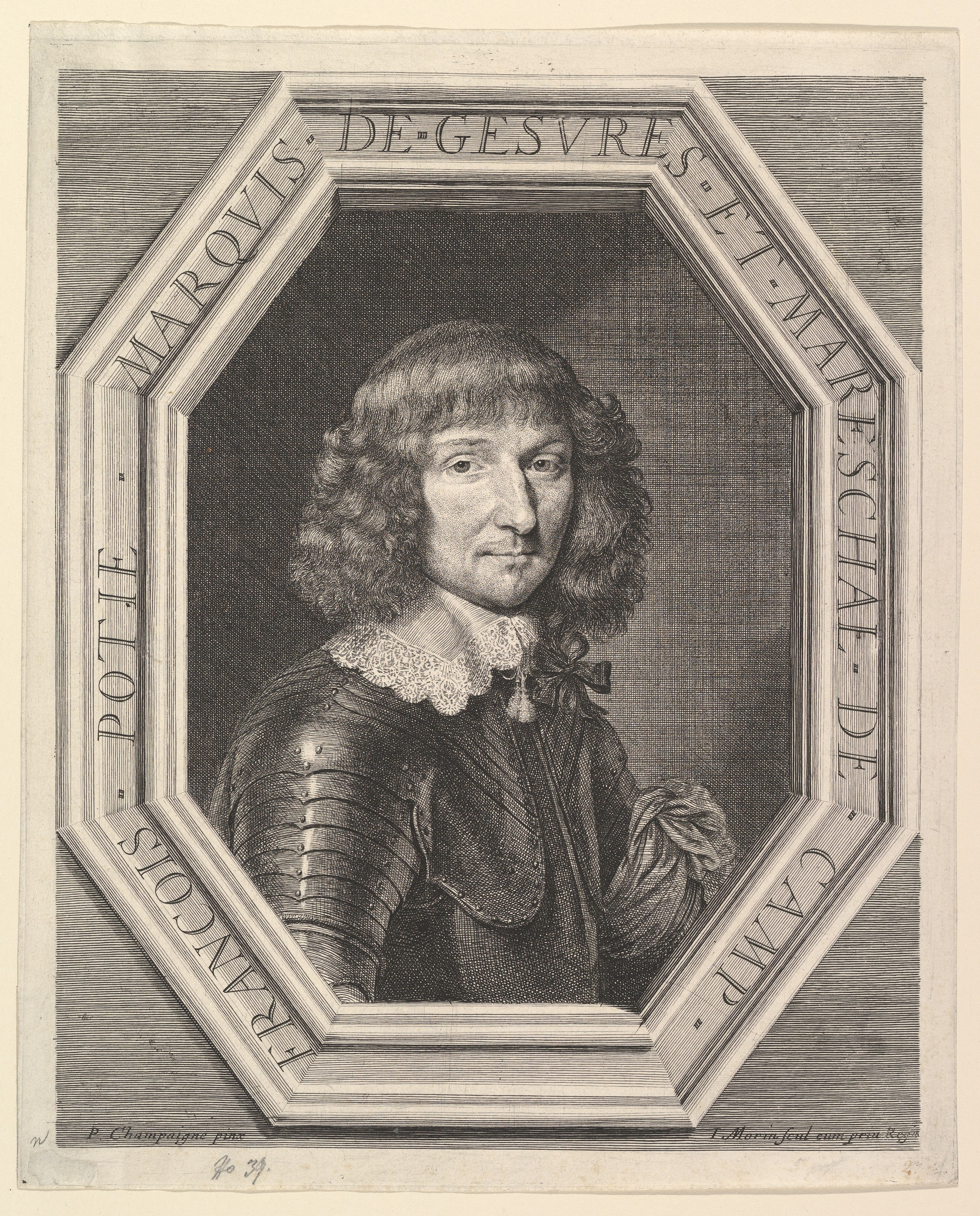
François Potier (1612-1646), marquis de Gesvres

== Sources ==
- Chartrand, René. Louis XIV's Army. London: Osprey Publishing, 1988. ISBN 0-85045-850-1
- Chartrand, René. Louis XV's Army (1) Cavalry & Dragoons. London: Osprey Publishing, 1996. ISBN 1-85532-602-7
- Philip Mansel. Pillars of Monarchy. London: Quartet Books 1984. ISBN 0-7043-2424-5
- Susane, Louis [in French] (1874). La Maison du Roi, Compagnies des Gardes du corps, avant 1620 (PDF). Histoire de la Cavalerie française. Paris: J. Hetzel.
