= François de Balsac =

Late 16th-century French governor and soldier

- seigneur d'Entragues
- Born: c. 1541
- Died: c. 1613
- Noble family: Maison d'Entragues
- Spouses: Jacqueline de Rohan (-1578); Marie Touchet (1578-1613)
- Issue: Charles de Balsac, seigneur d'Entragues; César de Balsac, baron de Gié; Charlotte-Catherine de Balsac; Henriette-Catherine de Balsac; Marie-Charlotte de Balsac
- Father: Guillaume de Balsac
- Mother: Louise d'Humières

François de Balsac, seigneur d’Entragues (c. 1541 –c. 1613) was a French noble, governor, military commander and courtier during the French Wars of Religion. Born into a prominent noble family from the Massif-Central, Entragues began his career serving as an officer in the company of the duke of Longueville. He caught the attention of the court, and was made lieutenant-general of the duchy of Orléans in 1568. This was shortly followed with specific authorities over the important city of Orléans in 1571. Unlike his two brothers Clermont and Dunes he was not a favourite of Henri III. He thus aligned with the duke of Guise and the Catholic ligue in the succession crisis that began in 1584 upon the death of the king's brother Alençon. When the ligue went to war with the king in 1585 in opposition to his chosen heir, his Protestant cousin Navarre, Entragues entered rebellion with them. Bringing the city of Orléans with him, he was at first driven back by royalist forces under the duke of Montpensier, holding off the duke with cannonades from the citadel, before returning to the offensive with an effort against Gien. This effort too was pushed aside by the royal favourite the duke of Épernon, however the war still concluded with a capitulation to the ligue.

Henri was keen in the wake of the war to resecure the loyalties of the various nobles who had affiliated with the ligue. Épernon was tasked with bringing Entragues into the royalist fold, and with the assistance of Entragues' brother Entraguet and his poor financial state, succeeded in making him into a royalist. He attempted to support the king in the Estates General of 1588 with the selection of royalist deputies, but was outmanoeuvred by the ligueur elite of the city. After the assassination of the duke of Guise by the king, Henri was once more at war with the ligue. Orléans rose up in support of the ligue and Entragues was besieged in the citadel, forced from the city by the end of January 1589. In 1602 Entragues was once again drawn into Malcontent conspiracies, this time that of the duke of Biron, while initially able to avoid reprisals on the uncovering of the conspiracy, in 1605 information that severely compromised him was uncovered, and he was sentenced to death, though this would be annulled by the king in favour of house arrest.

== Early life and family ==
=== Family ===
François de Balsac was born in 1541, the eldest son of Guillaume de Balsac and Louise d’Humières. He had two younger brothers, Charles de Balsac, seigneur de Clermont and Charles de Balsac, baron de Dunes and two sisters Louise de Balsac and Catherine de Balsac. Guillaume fought in the latter Italian Wars as lieutenant of the company of the duke of Guise, serving at the defence of Metz. He further served as the governor of Le Havre. The Balsac family had long established itself in the Massif-Central.

He was established as an enfant d’honneur in 1549, meaning he was raised alongside the children of Henri II. He enjoyed this privilege due to the influence of his maternal uncle who had responsibilities for the care of the royal children.

=== Marriage ===
François de Balsac was married first to Jacqueline de Rohan the daughter of the Lord of Gié, lieutenant general of Brittany. Upon her death, Henri thought it prudent to arrange a marriage between him and Marie Touchet in 1578. Marie Touchet had at one time been in a relationship with Charles IX and was the daughter of the lieutenant of Orléans.

=== Children ===
Together they had two daughters: Catherine-Henriette de Balsac, born in 1579, and Marie-Charlotte. Catherine-Henriette would catch the attentions of king Henri IV in 1599, who romantically pursued her. With the assistance of her parents she evaded his attempts initially, the family deciding they wanted to hold out until receiving financial reward. Henri relented and ordered the duke of Sully to give her 50,000 livres to buy an estate.

Over his two marriages Entragues had 5 children. With Jacqueline de Rohan they had:

- Charles de Balsac, seigneur d'Entragues (-1616).
- César de Balsac, baron de Gié (-1634).
- Charlotte-Catherine de Balsac.

With Marie Touchet they had:

- Henriette-Catherine de Balsac marquise de Verneuil (1579-1633).
- Marie-Charlotte de Balsac.

Entragues was a major landholder in the Île-de-France, with lordships over Marcoussis, La Ville-du-Bois, Boissy, Saint-Yon, Breux, Breuillet, Châtres and Nozay.

== Reign of Charles IX ==
During the long peace between the first and second civil war, Entragues served as guidon of the company of the duke of Longueville, though this role terminated in 1565.

=== Entry into royal favour ===
In 1567 he was elevated to the position of gentilhomme de la chambre du roi for Charles. In 1568 there was a large spasm of royal favour in which many governorships were granted to nobles to secure their loyalty to the crown. Among them was the granting of the lieutenant-generalcy of the Orléannais and Étampes to Entragues in April. Concurrently he was elevated into the highest order of French chivalry, when he was made chevalier de l’Ordre de Saint-Michel, an honour bestowed upon him by the duke of Anjou personally.

Entragues enjoyed the confidence of king Charles during 1570. As a result, when he was enraged at rumours that the young duke of Guise was courting his sister Marguerite, some sources suggest it was Entragues who was dispatched to the duke. Entragues would have warned Guise that if he persisted in his courtship, the king would have him killed. Soon thereafter Guise broke off his courtship and married Catherine de Clèves. During 1571 he was granted further authority over the city of Orléans as the bailli.

== Reign of Henri III ==
To compensate him for his pressured marriage to Marie de Touchet, Henri provided him with an inclusion in the first intake of his new highest order of French chivalry, making him a chevalier de l’ordre du Saint-Esprit in the first intake of 1578.

=== Ligueur ===
In 1582 he was elevated to conseiller d’ État giving him a role in state policy. With the death of the king's brother in July 1584, the Lorraine family took the opportunity to found a new Catholic ligue in opposition to the succession of the Protestant Navarre. Having founded their ligue in the latter part of the year, and allied with Philip II of Spain the ligue declared itself in revolt in March 1585. The duke of Guise opened hostilities by taking control of Châlons, meanwhile his brother Mayenne captured Dijon and Auxerre and cousin Mercœur rose up in Brittany. Allies of the family participated in the campaign, among them La Châtre who brought over his control of Bourges to the rebel cause, and Entragues who brought the city of Orléans into the ligueur camp. Entragues would be confronted by the duke of Montpensier near Orléans and would be driven back by the prince. Entrenching himself in the city he would greet the royalist troops with cannon fire and successfully rebuff Montpensier from taking the citadel on 21 April. Soon thereafter Marshal Aumont would be tasked with confronting Entragues, however he would be diverted to Gien. Entragues had moved out Orléans and joined forces with the ligueur La Châtre and Brissac to besiege the Protestant held town. Épernon was dispatched to relieve Gien and left Paris to that effect on 30 May, successfully driving away the ligueur army without battle on 3 June.

Elsewhere the ligue would find more notable successes. As the ligue army grew to a greater size, Henri was forced to the negotiating table, and conceded to the ligue in July, offering surety towns, outlawing Protestantism and agreeing to make war against his (now former) heir Navarre.

=== Returning to the fold ===
He was one of many ligueur nobles Henri was able to resecure the loyalty of, including Beauvais-Nangis, Jean de Manou and D’O, Catherine de' Medici for her part succeeded in detaching the duke of Nevers, head of one of the most powerful houses in France from the ligueur cause. Henri's re-acquisition of Entragues was enabled by the financial difficulties the noble was in, unable to support his position in Orléans and finding himself increasingly unpopular in the city. Épernon was in charge of securing Entragues for the king, and in December 1585 Entragues indicated he was willing to cede Orléans to a royalist candidate chosen by the king. Competition for his affections continued in early 1586 between the royalists and La Châtre for the ligueurs. Entragues’ brother Entraguet was dispatched to entreat with him, and spent a month in the city working to persuade him to come to Marcoussis where the king had an offer for him. By May 1586 he had acceded to the king's deal and returned to the royalist fold. Entragues wrote to the king that he would never again participate in a ‘’ligue’’ against royal authority.

Still felt to be sympathetic to the ligue in 1588, when a showdown came in Paris between the king and the ligue that saw the Swiss of the king driven from the streets by a makeshift army of Parisians under the command of Guise and Brissac, Entragues was courted for their efforts. On 13 May, with the king backed into his palace Guise wrote to Entragues in the early hours of the morning to urge him to come to the capital, and bring as many of their allies as they could muster. However things would not go to plan, and Henri slipped out of the capital, averting a final showdown. He had been tipped off to the ligueur plans through his interception of this message.

=== Royalist ===
In June, Entragues made his formal submission of loyalty to the crown.

As a result of the various concessions Henri made with the ligue after the Day of the Barricades an Estates General was to be convened. A fierce election campaign followed between the various factions. Entragues convened a royalist assembly at the palais de justice in Orléans to decide on delegates on 1 August, meanwhile the mayor of the city convened a rival ligueur assembly the following day. Entragues assembly was selected from various rural villages, hoping they could provide suitably docile delegates. However, Entragues was compelled to recognise his mayors assembly as the official one. The mood in the city was fiercely radical and this would be reflected in the delegates of the city in the end.

The Estates General did not go well for the king, who was forced by the ligueur deputies into concession after concession. Henri saw the hands of the duke of Guise behind the intransigence and impertinence of the Third Estate. He began to consider how to deal with the duke. His resolve in this respect was bolstered when Entragues visited him secretly to assure him of his loyalty and his willingness to hand over the city of Orléans to the king. However alternative theories of what caused the king to resolve to assassinate the duke of Guise are also proposed. Though he did not participate directly in the planning of the assassination, he was utilised as an agent for the project.

=== Orléans ===
The death of the duke brought Henri into open war with the ligue for the second time, and Henri was frustrated that the city of Orléans moved towards rebellion as early as 23 December. He angrily threatened the alderman of the city that if they did not submit themselves to Entragues and withdraw from their attempt to besiege him in the cities citadel within 24 hours he would make them the ‘unhappiest people of the kingdom’. His more realistic hopes for securing the loyalty of the city relied on Entragues diplomatic and military skills and several royalist notables within the walls.

During January the siege of the citadel continued, Mayenne, lieutenant-general of the ligue came to direct the bombardments, he took the opportunity to appoint his cousin the chevalier d’Aumale as the cities governor in opposition to Entragues. On 31 January the walls fell and Entragues and Marshal Aumont were forced to retreat from the city. It was decided that the citadel which represented royal tyranny over the urban privileges of the city should be dismantled, a process which was completed on 7 April. The chevalier d’Aumale for his part entrusted the governorship of the city to La Châtre, in whose hands it would remain for the following years.

== Reign of Henri IV ==
=== Malcontent ===
In 1602 Entragues involved himself in the conspiracy of the duke of Biron and the count of Auvergne, Entragues’ stepson. After a little time in captivity, Auvergne's connections to his half sister Catherine-Henriette and royal lineage allowed him release. Henriette for her part was implicated, she was frustrated in the king for going back on his 1599 promise to marry her, and held his written promise of this as a bargaining chip, however the king did not investigate further. In 1604 an English agent Thomas Morgan was captured, he revealed the liasing that had taken place between Auvergne, Entragues and Spanish agents in Paris. In response Henri ordered the Entragues Château de Marcoussis be searched. Entragues papers were seized, proving both his and his daughters involvement in the conspiracy. Entragues looked to save himself by providing the king the copy of his marriage promise to Catherine-Henriette.

This would not save Entragues, and in December he was arrested, and his daughter put under house arrest. The trial initially went against the king, with Entragues representing himself as a protector of his daughters life and honour. He explained his liasing with Spain was merely to find a safe refuge for his daughter. However Auvergne testified that Catherine-Henriette had been unfaithful to Henri, and she returned the favour. Auvergne then went further, arguing Catherine-Henriette and Entragues masterminded the entire conspiracy. In February 1605 Entragues, Auvergne and Morgan were sentenced to death by the Parlement. Henri's council was in favour of following the Parlement recommendation, however he was less keen. Much to the befuddlement of his ministers he chose to commute the death sentences. Auvergne was to live out the rest of his life in the Bastille, Entragues was put under permanent house arrest and Morgan was expelled from France.

=== Death of the king ===
With the Assassination of Henri IV in 1610, some suspicions turned to Entragues and his daughter as having had involvement in the killing, in particular after the Prévôt de Pluviers was found dead in his cell. Ultimately however culpability would remain an enigma.

== Sources ==
- Babelon, Jean-Pierre (2009). Henri IV. Fayard.
- Carroll, Stuart (2011). Martyrs and Murderers: The Guise Family and the Making of Europe. Oxford University Press.
- Chevallier, Pierre (1985). Henri III: Roi Shakespearien. Fayard.
- Cloulas, Ivan (1979). Catherine de Médicis. Fayard.
- Constant, Jean-Marie (1984). Les Guise. Hachette.
- Constant, Jean-Marie (1996). La Ligue. Fayard.
- Durot, Éric (2012). François de Lorraine, duc de Guise entre Dieu et le Roi. Classiques Garnier.
- Jouanna, Arlette (1998). Histoire et Dictionnaire des Guerres de Religion. Bouquins.
- Knecht, Robert (2014). Catherine de' Medici. Routledge.
- Knecht, Robert (2016). Hero or Tyrant? Henry III, King of France, 1574-1589. Routledge.
- Pitts, Vincent (2012). Henri IV of France: His Reign and Age. Johns Hopkins University Press.
- Roelker, Nancy (1996). One King, One Faith: The Parlement of Paris and the Religious Reformation of the Sixteenth Century. University of California Press.
- Le Roux, Nicolas (2000). La Faveur du Roi: Mignons et Courtisans au Temps des Derniers Valois. Champ Vallon.
- Le Roux, Nicolas (2006). Un Régicide au nom de Dieu: L'Assassinat d'Henri III. Gallimard.
- Salmon, J.H.M (1979). Society in Crisis: France during the Sixteenth Century. Metheun & Co.
