= Charles de Balsac, seigneur de Clermont =

Late 16th-century French courtier and royal favourite

Charles de Balsac
- seigneur de Clermont
- Born: c. 1545
- Died: 14 March 1590
- Noble family: Maison d'Entragues
- Spouse: Hélène Bon
- Issue: Henri de Balsac; Charles II de Balsac, baron de Dunes
- Father: Guillaume de Balsac
- Mother: Louise d'Humières

Charles de Balsac, seigneur de Clermont (known as Entragues or Clermont-Entragues) (c. 1545 – 14 March 1590) was a French courtier, favourite and soldier during the French Wars of Religion. The second son of Guillaume de Balsac and Louise d'Humières he was a member of a prominent Massif-Central noble family. He began his career during the peace between the first and second wars of religion, serving under the command of Marshal Cossé. He became close to the king, serving him as a gentilhomme de la chambre, before defecting to the household of his brother Anjou. He fought under the command of Anjou during the siege of La Rochelle, and joined the prince when he became king of the Commonwealth. Upon Anjou's return to France, as king Henri III he became first écuyer and then one of the captains of the king's bodyguard.

He received both of the highest chivalric orders of the king, being made chevalier of the Ordre de Saint-Michel in 1576, and then of the Ordre du Saint-Esprit in 1583. He remained loyal to the king during the crisis of the Catholic ligue in 1584, unlike his elder brother the seigneur d'Entragues. Frustrated at the continued concessions he was forced to make to the ligue, Henri resolved in December 1588 to kill its leader the duke of Guise. Entragues had a role to play in the assassination, his troops surrounding the residence of the dukes mother the duchess of Nemours. The killing of the duke brought Henri into war with the ligue again, and Entragues remained with the king as his bodyguard in early 1589. On 1 August the king was fatally wounded by a radical Catholic. Entragues was with the king in his final hours, and on his death was distraught. His heir, the Protestant Henri IV secured his service through a promise to protect Catholicism, and he served with him against the ligue in early 1590. On 14 March 1590 he was killed fighting alongside the king against the Catholic ligue at the Battle of Ivry.

== Early life and family ==
=== Family ===
Charles de Balsac was born in 1545, the second son of Guillaume de Balsac and Louise d'Humières. He had an elder brother François de Balsac, a younger brother, Charles de Balsac, baron de Dunes and two sisters Louise de Balsac and Catherine de Balsac. Guillaume had seen service during the latter Italian Wars, serving as a lieutenant in the company of the duke of Guise in the famous defence of Metz In addition to this service, Guillaume was also the governor of Le Havre. The Balsac family had established itself to a great degree in the Massif-Central.

=== Marriage ===
On 18 December 1577 a marriage contract was signed for him to Hélène Bon. Hélène was the widow of La Tour, maître de le garde robe for Charles IX. She had one child with him, before being widowed in 1574. She was the daughter of Pierre Bon, a galley captain turned governor of Marseille. Entragues did not meet her at Marseille, and would first see his wife upon a visit to court. Witnessing the ceremony were his uncle Jacques d'Humières, his two brothers Entraguet and the seigneur d’Entragues and various figures from the Parlement. To celebrate the marriage the king granted Entragues 50,000 livres, of which he provided 12,000 to his new wife the same day. After his death, Hélène would remarry again, to Philibert de Marcilly.

Charles and Hélène had two children:

- Henri de Balsac, baron de Clermont.
- Charles II de Balsac, baron de Dunes (-1610).

Entragues was able to get from the king the abbey of Notre-Dame de Buron in the diocese of Mans for one of his children during 1587.

In 1587 he and his wife purchased a grand residence for themselves in Paris, the Hôtel d'Aumale on the rue des Fossés-Saint-Germain.

== Reign of Charles IX ==
=== Early service ===
His military career commenced in 1565, through service in the company of Marshal Cossé first as his guidon and then as his ensign in 1567 at the outbreak of the second war of religion. Having originally been a member of Charles IX’s household as a gentilhomme de la chambre in 1570, he defected to the brother of the king, the duke of Anjou’s household. During his service to Charles he had been rewarded with the lands of Gaudelon, and the abbey of Saint-Pierre-sur-Dive.

Entragues participated in the royal reduction of La Rochelle in 1572 after the city entered rebellion against the crown. Anjou entrusted him to act an intermediary with the court, providing updates to the king about the progress of the siege. For his assistance during the siege the duke granted him a gratuity of 1,100 livres, however he would not actually receive the sum for another five years. He served Anjou in the Commonwealth after his election as king in 1573, holding a place in his household as a Chambellan. he returned with his lord upon his return to rule France as Henri III. The king granted him the role of écuyer in his household.

== Reign of Henri III ==
=== Captain of the guard ===
He would not serve as an écuyer to the new king for long, serving first as a gentilhomme de la chambre du roi and then as a captain of his bodyguard upon the death of Gaspard de La Châtre who died on 20 November 1576. He served in this role alongside Joachim de Châteauvieux and Jean d'O.

During 1576 he would also be elevated into the highest order of French chivalry, when he was made a chevalier de l’ordre de Saint-Michel.

Throughout the king’s reign he would remain close to Henri, unlike his two brothers. In 1583 he was rewarded for his service with an elevation to the king’s new most senior order of chivalry, being established as a chevalier de l’Ordre du Saint-Esprit. That same year he joined the penitential order established by one of the kings chief favourites Joyeuse, the Pénitents Bleus de Saint-Jérôme as one of its 72 members.

In the ligue crisis that accompanied the death of the king’s brother Alençon, Entragues was a consistent fixture of court, at a time when his brother had entered rebellion alongside the house of Lorraine..

=== Assassination of the duke of Guise ===
Due to their proximity to the king, he and Châteauvieux played a role in the operations of the assassination of the duke of Guise in December. The duke, having been called to council, was separated from his secretary Péricard, who quickly understood what was about to transpire. Alongside the ligueur governor of Limousin he hurried to Mme de Nemours, hoping that if she could throw herself at the feet of Catherine de Medici the duke could be saved. However the two men were prevented from reaching the duchess by Swiss troops under the command Entragues and Châteauvieux. With the murder of the duke, it was alleged that Entragues helped himself to the diamond ring on the deceased grandees hand by the ligueur writers. In the wake of the assassination various arrests of leading ligueur allies of the duke were undertaken. Entragues undertook discussions with the king for how to distribute the prisoners.

Entragues was scandalised by the king’s decision, in the wake of his near capture outside Tours to don the white sash that was associated with the Protestants. Henri was however too grateful for the aid Navarre had provided him in repelling the ligueur Mayenne to care.

Entragues remained in the king’s intimate circle of favourites however, and was with him at Saint-Cloud as he prepared to besiege Paris back into submission. The preparations would not however go to plan, when a Dominican friar deceived his way into the king’s presence and then stabbed him on 1 August. After the attack on the king that mortally wounded him, Entragues was by the king’s side in his final hours, and when instructed swore to follow Navarre as the king’s successor. When at last the king expired, he and the other gathered favourites broke down in tears, throwing their hats and clenching their fists. They were now faced with the prospect of serving a Protestant king, which violated their interests, religion and access to the monarch, Navarre already having his own cadre of advisers.

== Reign of Henri IV ==
To ensure he could bring these distraught Catholic nobles on board, Navarre, now styling himself Henri IV, issued a declaration. He promised he would protect the Catholic faith and call a council within 6 months to receive instruction in the Catholic religion. This was sufficient for segments of the Catholic nobility, among them the lieutenant-general of Champagne, Dinteville, Marshal Aumont, the duke of Longueville and Entragues.

=== Ivry and death ===
Allied with the Protestant king, Entragues joined him on his retreat into Normandie after the failures outside Paris. The lieutenant-general of the kingdom for the ligue Mayenne gave chase, hoping to drive Henri into the sea. The two sides met at Ivry on 14 March 1590, where Mayenne was handed a bruising defeat. In the combat Entragues, who was fighting beside the king, was killed.

== Sources ==
- Babelon, Jean-Pierre (2009). Henri IV. Fayard.
- Carroll, Stuart (2011). Martyrs and Murderers: The Guise Family and the Making of Europe. Oxford University Press.
- Chevallier, Pierre (1985). Henri III: Roi Shakespearien. Fayard.
- Cloulas, Ivan (1979). Catherine de Médicis. Fayard.
- Constant, Jean-Marie (1984). Les Guise. Hachette.
- Constant, Jean-Marie (1996). La Ligue. Fayard.
- Durot, Éric (2012). François de Lorraine, duc de Guise entre Dieu et le Roi. Classiques Garnier.
- Jouanna, Arlette (1998). Histoire et Dictionnaire des Guerres de Religion. Bouquins.
- Knecht, Robert (2014). Catherine de' Medici. Routledge.
- Knecht, Robert (2016). Hero or Tyrant? Henry III, King of France, 1574-1589. Routledge.
- Pitts, Vincent (2012). Henri IV of France: His Reign and Age. Johns Hopkins University Press.
- Le Roux, Nicolas (2000). La Faveur du Roi: Mignons et Courtisans au Temps des Derniers Valois. Champ Vallon.
- Le Roux, Nicolas (2006). Un Régicide au nom de Dieu: L'Assassinat d'Henri III. Gallimard.
- Salmon, J.H.M (1979). Society in Crisis: France during the Sixteenth Century. Metheun & Co.
