= Joachim de Châteauvieux =

Late 16th-early 17th century guard of the king and governor

- baron de Verjon comte de Confolant
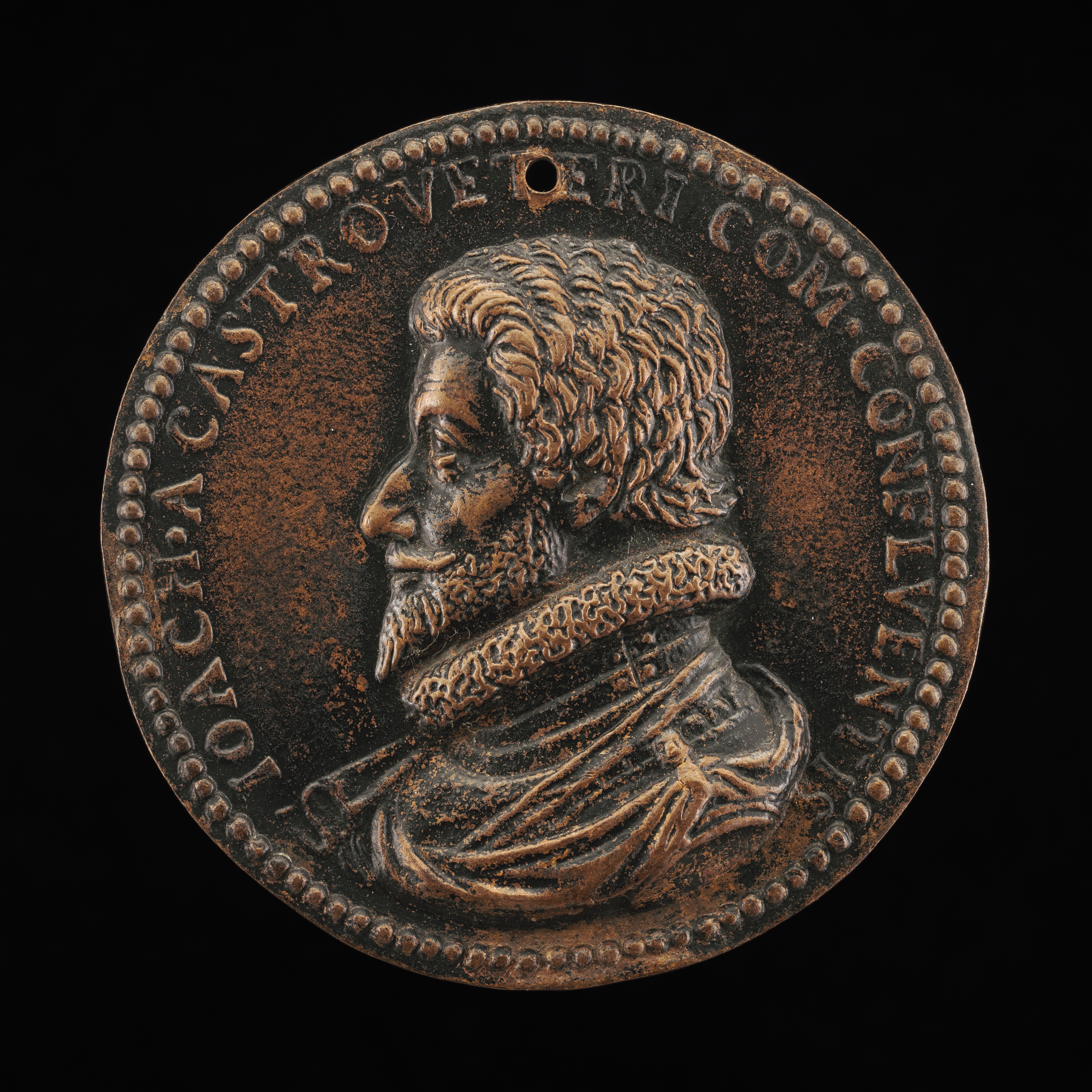
- Medal of Châteauvieux
- Born: c. 1545
- Died: c. 1615
- Noble family: Maison de Châteauvieux
- Father: Claude de Châteauvieux
- Mother: Marie de Montchenu

Joachim de Châteauvieux, baron de Verjon puis comte de Confolant (c. 1545–c. 1615) was a French governor, military officer, royal guard and favourite, during the French Wars of Religion and early Seventeenth-Century. Born into a noble family from Bresse with a history of royal service, Châteauvieux came to the attention of the royal family during the siege of La Rochelle in 1573, part of the fourth French War of Religion. The siege was led by the king's brother Anjou, and after Anjou was elected as king of the Commonwealth, Châteauvieux travelled with him to his new kingdom, serving as a member of his household during his brief reign there before he returned to France as Henri III. Back in France, Châteauvieux was again made a member of the king's household. In 1578, the king's long serving captain of the Scots Guard died, and Henri chose Châteauvieux for the prestigious post. In the following years he received both of the royal orders, that of Saint-Michel and Saint-Esprit.

In 1587 he joined the royal favourite Anne de Joyeuse for a campaign against the Protestant king of Navarre. During the Battle of Coutras, Joyeuse was killed and Châteauvieux was taken prisoner. The following year, Henri decided that he could no longer tolerate the humiliations imposed upon him by the Catholic ligue and resolved to assassinate its leader the duke of Guise. Châteauvieux, as captain of the guard had a part to play in this plan, stationing his soldiers outside the residence of the duke's mother Anne d'Este keeping her under watch. For this he would be excoriated by ligueur narratives of the assassination. In the war with the ligue that followed, Châteauvieux fought for the royalist cause, remaining loyal after the death of Henri III and ascent of his heir Navarre as Henri IV. Henri confirmed him in the post of captain of the Scots guard. In 1595 he fought at the famous Battle of Fontaine-Française that broke the power of the domestic ligue. In 1601 he was created comte de Confolant and granted the office of bailli of several recently conquered territories from Savoie. Soon thereafter he was dispossessed of his post as captain of the guard after he reacted severely to one of Henri's indiscretions. In 1610 he was made governor of the Bastille, and would hold this charge until his death in 1615.

== Early life and family ==
Joachim de Châteauvieux was born in 1545, the son of Claude de Châteauvieux and Marie de Montchenu. His father had served previous kings of France, occupying the offices of maître de l'hôtel du roi, commander of the Swiss of Valais and bailli of Bresse. Therefore, Joachim would seek to follow this path of entering royal service.

The Châteauvieux family was from Bresse, and brought to Châteauvieux the title of baron de Verjon, but also had holdings across Poitou. During the fifteenth century the family had served the dukes of Savoie.

As part of his service at the court, Châteauvieux would acquire lodgings in Paris, acquiring a place on the rue de Grenelle in the house of Pierre de Marennes. This residence was advantageous, being only 300 metres from the Louvre where the king resided.

== Reign of Charles IX ==
=== La Rochelle ===
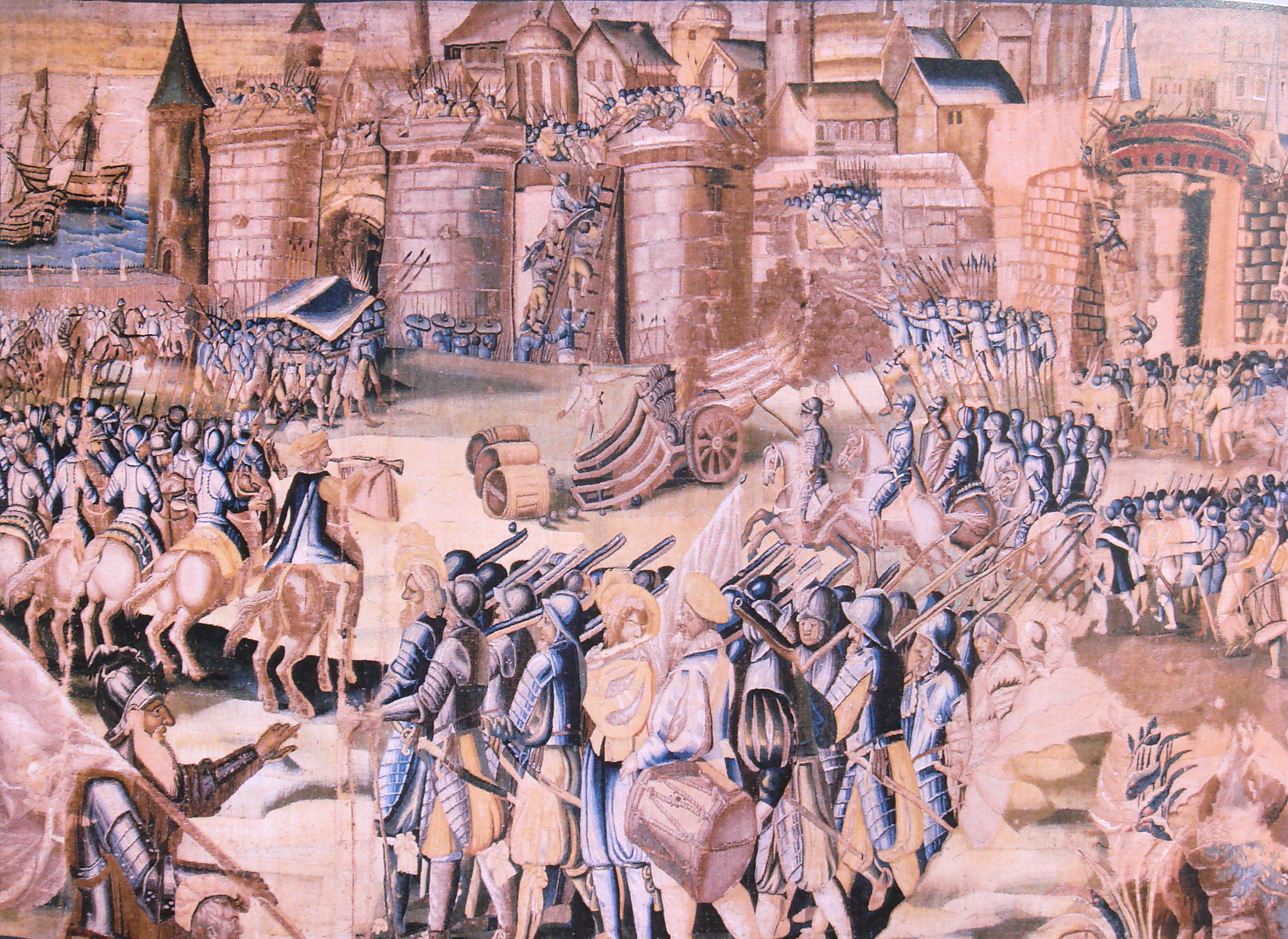
The Siege of La Rochelle, conducted by the king's brother Anjou during which Châteauvieux was wounded

After the Massacre of Saint Bartholomew the city of La Rochelle entered rebellion. The reduction of the city was viewed as a priority by the crown, which dispatched Anjou, brother to the king to conduct the siege of the city. Many nobles flocked to the siege lines, eager to get their first taste of combat. Among the nobles who came to the siege was Châteauvieux. During the conduct of the siege, Châteauvieux received a musket shot to his hip. Ultimately the siege would be brought to a negotiated conclusion, Anjou keen to depart after word arrived that he had been elected as king of the Polish-Lithuanian Commonwealth.

=== Commonwealth ===
Châteauvieux travelled with Anjou to the Commonwealth, serving him as a gentilhomme de la chambre during his tenure in the country. Châteauvieux remained with the king in the Commonwealth until his flight from the country back to France upon the death of Charles IX, travelling with him through Savoie for his re-entry into the country. Upon Anjou's return to France as king Henri III, he would again be made gentilhomme de la chambre. He would hold this office until such time as he was made a captain of the king's guard.

== Reign of Henri III ==
In 1578 Châteauvieux was established to the highest order of French chivalry, that of the Ordre de Saint-Michel. Henri had largely stopped awarding this honour after the glut of awards that had taken place in the prior century, however he occasionally awarded it to his favourites.

=== Captain of the Scots ===
Jean de Losses had served as the captain of the king's Scottish Guards since 1563. Henri did not like Losses, who was close to his brother Alençon and disparaged the king's favourites. Despite this hostility, Losses was allowed to maintain his position over the guard until his death on 6 June 1579. Henri took the opportunity of his passing to install one of his favourites in the sensitive and prestigious post. When Rambouillet was dispossessed of the post he held in one of the king's other guards in 1580 he received in compensation the government of Metz and 20,000 livres.

By now Châteauvieux was an intimate of the king, and when Henri retired from the court to Saint-Germain in February 1580, Châteauvieux was among a small circle of men (D'O, Joyeuse and La Valette) who accompanied him.

During the 1580s, Joyeuse and Épernon ascended to premier favourites of the king. Châteauvieux fell into the orbit of Épernon, becoming a member of his entourage. Therefore, when Épernon made petitions to secure posts and honours for his various clients he was sure to include Châteauvieux and La Guiche in them, so that neither of their interests would be damaged by his petitioning.

=== Honours ===
Having previously been made chevalier de l'Ordre de Saint-Michel, Henri again bestowed honour upon Châteauvieux in 1583. By this time he had established his new Ordre du Saint-Esprit to take the place of Saint-Michel as the highest royal order of chivalry. Therefore, Châteauvieux was inducted into this order in that year. That same year he was made a conseiller d'État.

In August of that year, François de Joyeuse established a new penitential order, that of the Penitents bleus de Saint-Jérôme. 72 members were inducted into this confraternity, among them Épernon and his brother La Valette, Marshal Retz and all the captains of Henri's guard among them Châteauvieux.

=== Coutras ===
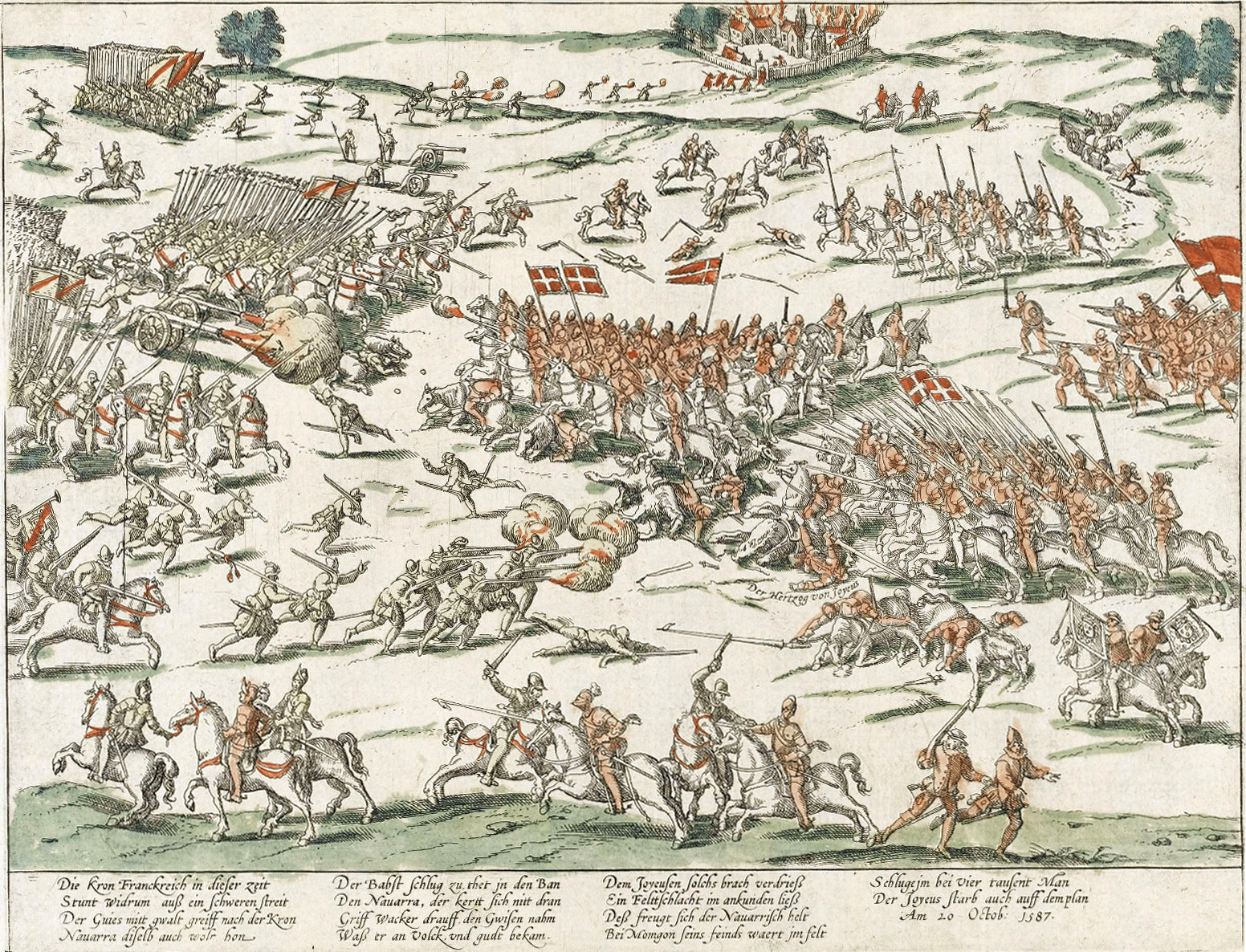
Contemporary illustration of the Battle of Coutras at which Châteauvieux was made prisoner

As a result of his failed war with the Catholic ligue, Henri was compelled to make war on Protestantism in France. As part of this effort, his chief favourite Joyeuse led a campaign against the Protestant king of Navarre in 1587. The two sides came to battle at Battle of Coutras, and in the resulting combat Joyeuse was killed in a decisive victory for Navarre and the Protestants. Châteauvieux had participated in the battle, and was captured during its course. Navarre treated the leading nobles that had been captured generously, and they were released on parole so that they could raise their ransoms.

=== Assassination of the duke of Guise ===
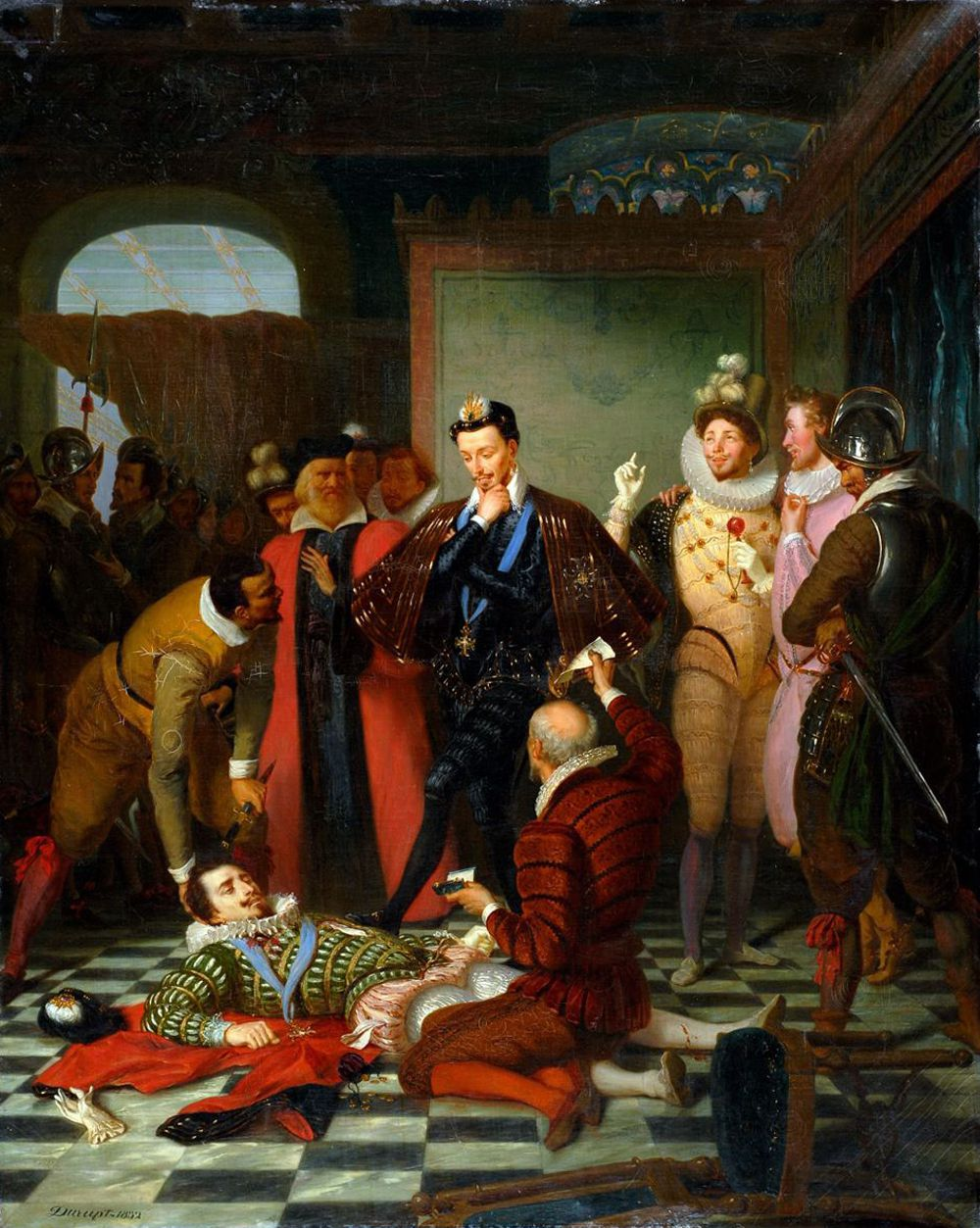
Assassination of Henri I, Duke of Guise, by Henri III, in 1588. Painting by Charles Durupt in the Château de Blois, where the attack took place.

By late 1588, Henri's tolerance of the humiliations imposed upon him by the ligue and its leader the duke of Guise had reached its limit. Therefore, he resolved to have him assassinated. To this end he was called to a council meeting on 23 December. Having been excluded from re-entering the council chamber back to their master after having been called away, it became clear to Guise's secretary Péricard, that the duke was in danger. He at first thought to rush and warn the dukes son the prince de Joinville, but he was out riding with the grand prieur. He next attempted to reach the duke's mother the duchesse de Nemours, however her residence was guarded by Clermont d'Entragues and Châteauvieux, both of whom had been ordered by the king to station their Swiss on the door and allow no one to enter or leave. Péricard was right to be concerned, shortly thereafter the duke would be called from the council into a side chamber, where he would be cut down by members of the king's bodyguard, the Quatre Cinq. Both Châteauvieux and Clermont d'Entragues would be excoriated in ligueur narratives for their role in 'planning the crime'.

In the early months of 1589, Henri established himself at Tours. With him in the city were all those Parlementaires who had been exiled from participation in the ligueur controlled Paris Parlement for their royalist sympathies. Henri established them in the city as a counter-Parlement. To open this new body he held a lit de justice which Châteauvieux and other notables were present for.

Having visited a monastery outside the walls of Tours on 8 May, Henri found himself in trouble caught outside the walls of the city with only a small entourage when a ligueur army approached. His small force was only able to rebuff the attacks with the assistance of his new ally the Protestant Navarre. Henri was delighted that Navarre had come to his assistance, and as a show of his appreciation took to wearing a white sash, which was a motif Henri and the Protestants had used for many years. Several of Henri's favourites: Clermont d'Entragues, D'O and Châteauvieux were all scandalised by this behaviour from their lord, meanwhile Marshal D'Aumont took the opinion that only 'homosexuals' would object to this olive branch to the Protestants.

=== Death of the king ===
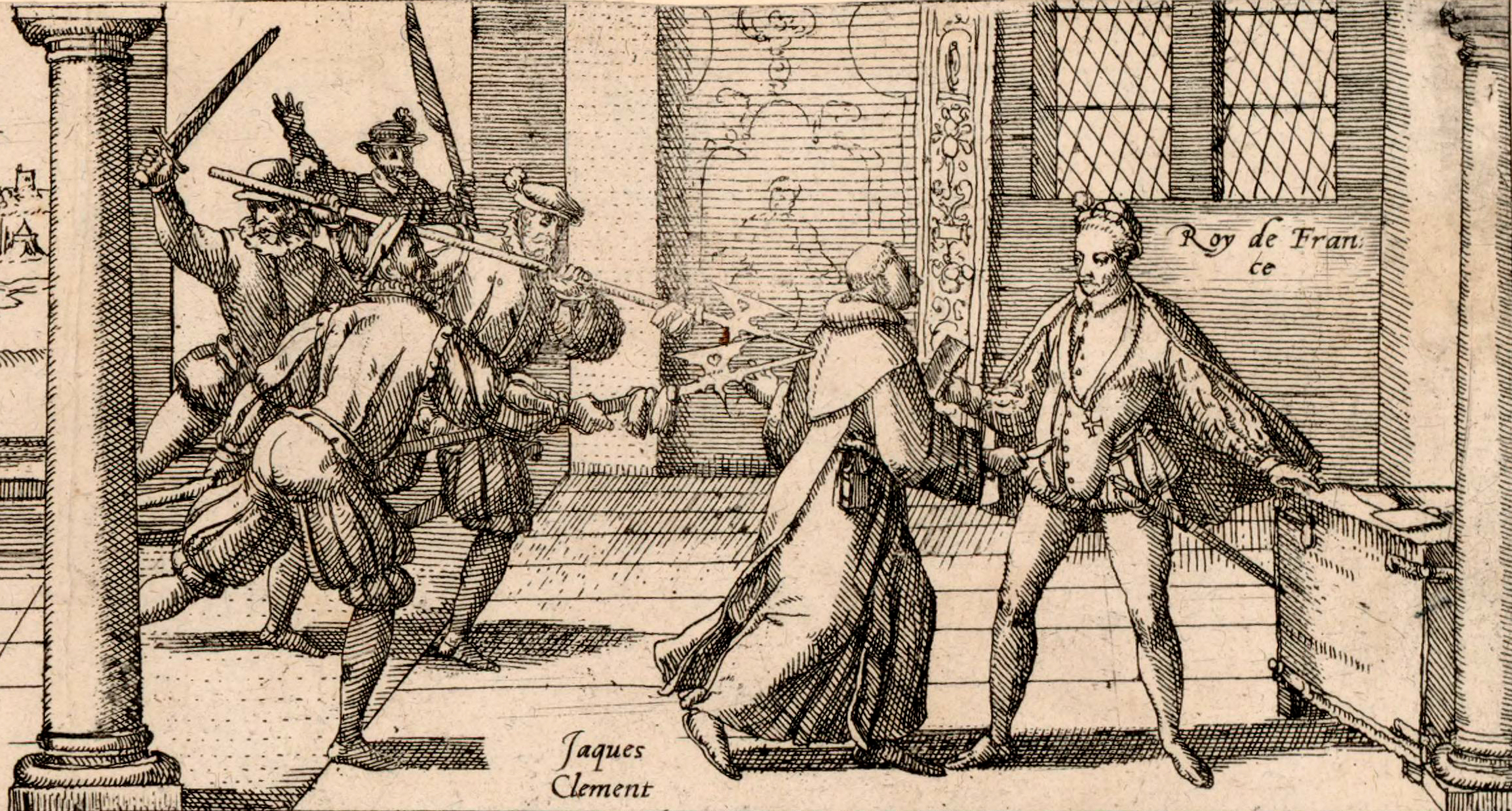
Jacques Clément assassinating Henri III

On 1 August while preparing to begin the siege of Paris, Henri was fatally wounded by the radical Catholic Jacques Clément. As he neared death on 2 August, he ensured all his favourites and servants swore to follow the Protestant Navarre on his death. Châteauvieux and the others who gathered around the king's beside promised to do so. Upon his death that day they became distraught throwing their hats down, clenching their fists and swearing that they would rather die a thousand deaths than serve Navarre (now styled Henri IV). Henri was not insensitive to these dispositions, and was aware that service to him had the potential to violate their religion and also impede their access to favour, given he already had a household of his own. To this end after some confusion, Henri would issue a declaration on 4 August by which he promised to protect the Catholic religion and host a general council to resolve the religious question. This was sufficient for many of those Catholic notables. Among those who signed this declaration by Henri would be the duc de Longueville, the lieutenant-general of Champagne Dinteville, Marshals D'Aumont and Biron, and the captains of the guard Clermont-D'Entragues, Manou and Châteauvieux.

== Reign of Henri IV ==
=== Loyalist ===
Henri confirmed Châteauvieux in the charge he held, and he would remain captain of the Scots Guard in the years to come. He fought for Henri in the war with the ligue, seeing combat at the final major battle of the civil war in 1595 at Fontaine-Française.

=== Rewards of service ===
In 1601 he was created comte de Confolant as a reward for his years of service. He was also granted the position of bailli for territories won for France in the recent war with Savoie: Bresse, Bugey, Valromey. That same year he exchanged his office of captain of the guard for chevalier d'honneur of Marie de Medici. This change was a response to an incident in which Henri IV had taken off during a hunt escaping from his guards protection to spend some time in an inn with merchants. Châteauvieux arrived at the inn with four guards and tapped Henri on the shoulder with his blade, sternly telling him to come with them. This had displeased Henri greatly.

He would be established, in 1610, as the governor of the Bastille, a charge he would hold until his death in 1615.

== Sources ==
- Babelon, Jean-Pierre (2009). Henri IV. Fayard.
- Constant, Jean-Marie (1984). Les Guise. Hachette.
- Constant, Jean-Marie (1996). La Ligue. Fayard.
- Knecht, Robert (2016). Hero or Tyrant? Henry III, King of France, 1574-1589. Routledge.
- Le Roux, Nicolas (2000). La Faveur du Roi: Mignons et Courtisans au Temps des Derniers Valois. Champ Vallon.
- Le Roux, Nicolas (2006). Un Régicide au nom de Dieu: L'Assassinat d'Henri III. Gallimard.
