= François du Plessis =

Late Sixteenth Century French noble and royal official

- sieur de Richelieu
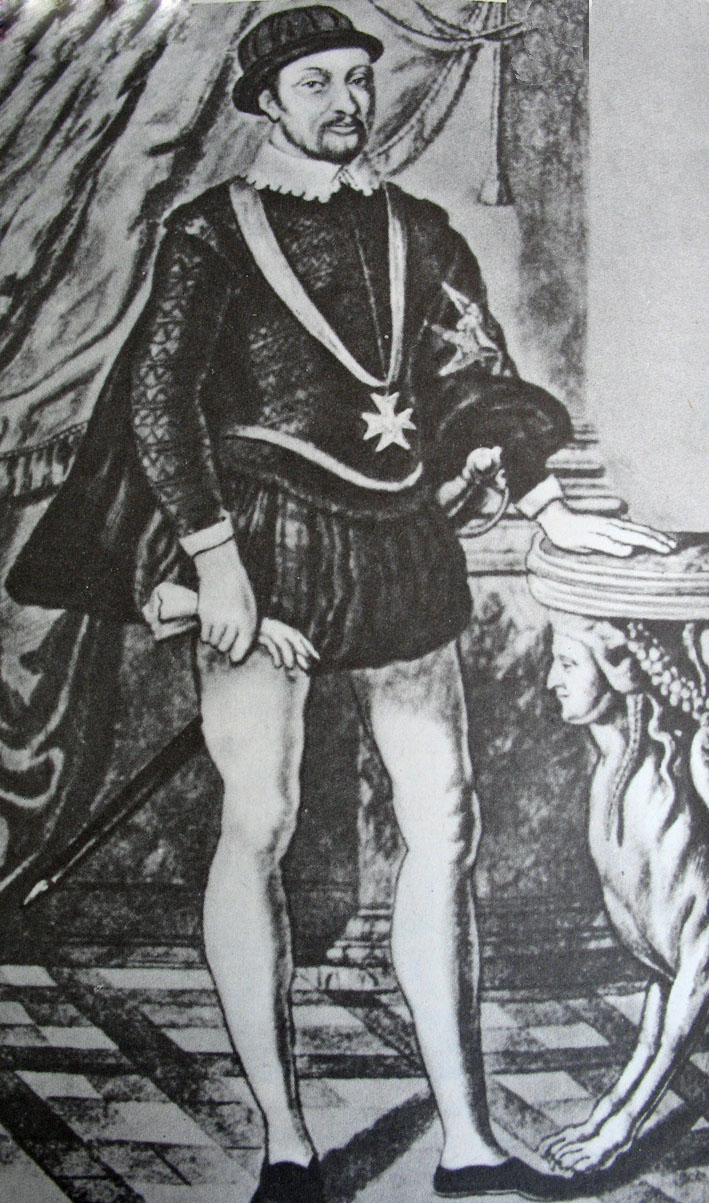
- Richelieu wearing the collar of Saint-Esprit
- Other titles: Grand Prévôt de France; Grand Prévôt de l'Hôtel
- Born: c. 1548; Château de Richelieu
- Died: 10 June 1590; Gonesse
- Family: House of Plessis
- Spouse: Suzanne de La Porte
- Issue: Alphonse-Louis du Plessis; Cardinal Richelieu
- Father: Louis du Plessis, sieur de Richelieu
- Mother: Françoise de Rochechouart

François du Plessis, sieur de Richelieu (c. 1548–10 June 1590) was a French noble, military officer, and royal official during the French Wars of Religion. Born into an obscure noble family from Poitou, Richelieu began his career in the service of the Montpensier. He fought in the third war of religion under the command of the son of the duke of Montpensier at Jarnac and Moncontour. He again fought under the Montpensier, this time prince de Dombes during the fifth war of religion. It was on the recommendation of the Montpensier that Richelieu was elevated to the post of Grand Prévôt de l'Hôtel in February 1578, which the king combined with the new office of Grand Prévôt de France, giving him police authority both over the king's household and France at large. He would take to this role with enthusiasm, becoming a consistent advocate of the royal will. By the 1580s he had become a major creditor of the monarchy, serving as the intermediary between Italian banking families and the crown, this eventually brought him into financial ruin.

In 1584, the crown was thrown into crisis by the death of the king's brother Alençon and subsequent prospect of the succession of the Protestant Navarre. In response elements of the Catholic nobility entered rebellion against the crown in a Catholic ligue led by the duke of Guise. While at peace with the crown in 1588, Guise sought to impose his authority over Richelieu, instructing him not to garrison Saumur on the Loire to protect against Navarre's army. Richelieu refused to follow any orders but those given to him by Henri III. He played an important role in the assassination of the duke a few months later, leading the arrest of his son the prince de Joinville and several leading members of the Third Estate who were allied with the ligue. This assassination brought Henri into war with the ligue again, and Richelieu participated in a failed attempt to maintain the loyalty of Poitiers to the crown, the city arresting and then expelling him. With the assassination of Henri III in August 1589, Richelieu transferred his loyalty to Navarre, now styled Henri IV. He fought at the Battle of Arques and Battle of Ivry, was made captain of Henri's guard, before dying in June 1590 during the royalist siege of ligueur held Paris. One of his sons, with Suzanne de La Porte was Cardinal Richelieu.

== Early life and family ==
François du Plessis was born into a minor noble family from Poitou in 1548 at the Château de Richelieu. He was the son of Louis du Plessis, sieur de Richelieu and Françoise de Rochechouart. His mother had connections to the Montpensier family that would prove valuable for his early career.

He had an elder brother, Louis du Plessis, who also served the Montpensier's, however he was dead by 1569.

Richelieu was married to Suzanne de La Porte in 1569. She was from a prominent robe noble family, and brought with her a dowry of 10,000 livres and inheritance rights to her father's estates. Together they would be the father of Armand Jean du Plessis, cardinal de Richilieu, chief minister to Louis XIII. The two godfathers of the future Cardinal were Marshal Jean VI d'Aumont and Marshal Armand de Gontaut both military lynch pins for Henri III. The parents named the child Armand Jean in their honour.

Alongside the future Cardinal, Richelieu had another two sons (Henri and Alphonse) and two daughters (Nicole and Francoise).

By 1579 he and his wife had purchased a residence in the capital, located on rue du Bouloi.

== Reign of Charles IX ==
He began his career serving as a page to King Charles IX before becoming guidon in the company of the prince Dauphin, son of the duke of Montpensier. By 1569 he was a gentilhomme ordinaire de la chambre du roi.

Richelieu saw his first military service during the third French War of Religion. Fighting for the royalists, he saw combat at the Battle of Jarnac, during which the leader of the Protestant rebels, the prince of Condé was killed, and then a year later at the far more decisive royalist victory of Moncontour, which annihilated much of the Protestant army.

In 1573, shortly after the Massacre of Saint Bartholomew, the city of La Rochelle entered rebellion. The crown was keen to see the recovery of this key port city, and therefore dispatched the king's brother Anjou to reduce the city. Many nobles travelled with him for the conduct of the siege, among them Richelieu.

== Reign of Henri III ==
=== Fifth war of religion ===
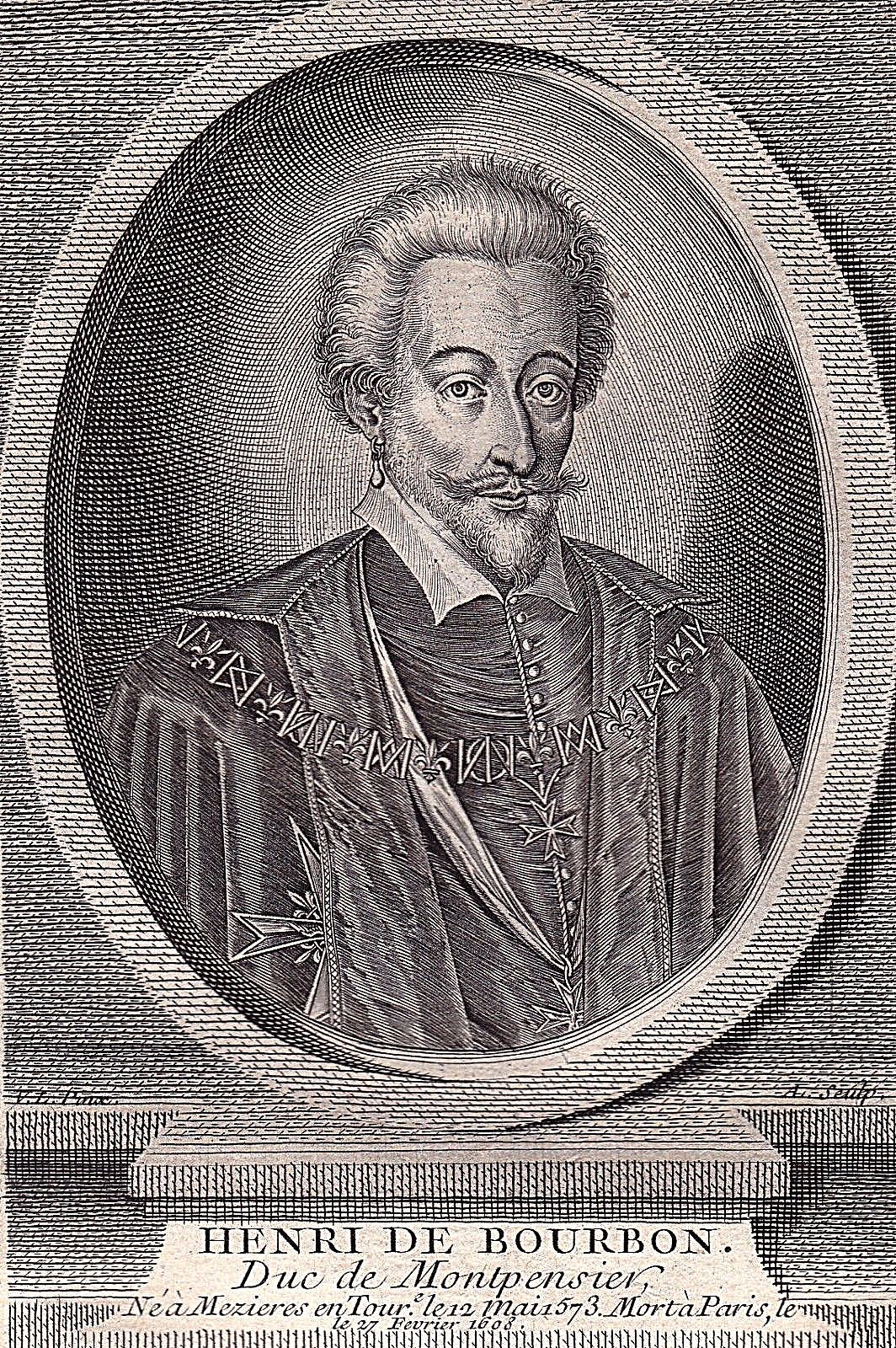
Henri de Bourbon, duke of Montpensier (1592–1608) and prince de Dombes

During the fifth war of religion he fought in the west of France under the command of the prince de Dombes, grandson of the duke of Montpensier. He served Dombes as a lieutenant of his company of men-at-arms.

As a term of the Peace of Monsieur which brought the fifth war of religion to a close, the king's brother Alençon who had fought with the rebels against Henri III was granted the Duchy of Anjou, Touraine and Berry. Richelieu as a commissioner for the king had responsibilities for the transfer of the duchy of Anjou to Alençon. He provided the prince his new duchy on 18 June of that year.

During 1576, Richelieu received the honour of being elevated to the highest order of French chivalry, the Ordre de Saint-Michel. Henri no longer created many knights of Saint-Michel, and reserved the honour for his favourites.

=== Grand Prévôt ===
On 28 February 1578, Henri III established a new office, that of Grand Prévôt de France to combat disorders that were rampant in the kingdom. It was hoped that this would function in the manner of the provincinal lieutenant-generals and curb overmighty provincial governors. Richilieu was established in this charge. The parameters of its responsibility would be clarified in letters patent of 11 May of that year. That same month he received the charge of Grand Prévot de l'Hôtel from the baron de Senecey. This charge was responsible for the security of the royal residence, with a force of various lieutenants and functionaries alongside 78 archers bearing halberds at his disposal. It further gave him policing power up to ten leagues around the royal residence. Alongside their security role these archers could present themselves formally on diplomatic occasions, as when the Earl of Derby came to France to present Henri with the Order of the Garter in 1585. It was upon the recommendation of his patron, the duke of Montpensier that he was selected by the king to assume these responsibilities. These appointments, alongside that of Rhodes as grand maître des cérémonies and his various premier gentilhomme de la chambre were designed to dilute the authority that the duke of Guise held in his capacity as Grand Maître.

Richelieu proved a strong advocate of royal authority over seigneurial rights. He went as far as to advocate the death penalty for those who defied the king's wishes.

In the late 1570s, Richelieu was a sporadic presence on the Conseil d'État. His missions kept him away from court often, as when in August 1579 he was tasked with arresting La Roche Guyon in Normandie, who had become the author of a conspiracy against the crown.

The king's brother Alençon had, by the early 1580s, established himself as king of Nederland. He required troops to prop up his position in the country, and took to raising them illegally in Bretagne, levying them without a commission from the king. Richelieu entered Bretagne in 1582 in pursuit of soldiers raised by the prince.

=== Naval affairs ===
During the succession crisis for the Portuguese crown, Richelieu had financial dealings with the pretender to the throne Don Antonio. He also spent considerable money in maritime investments. In 1582 he acquired three vessels from Hughes d'Aragon, which he fitted out for trade in Guinea. The following year he acquired a further two from the duke of Elbeuf then another three from the count of Brissac. He was not solely in the business of acquisition however, and sold several of the ships on to other royal favourites such as Joyeuse and Schomberg.

=== Creditor ===
Richelieu became a major creditor of the monarchy in the 1580s. This was both in direct loans from himself to the crown, and through acting as an intermediary between the king and Italian banking families in the capital. From 1583 to 1588 he borrowed 1,060,000 livres from Sébastien Zamet to provide funds for the crown. In theory the crown would reimburse him so he could pay off the debts, but it proved increasingly incapable of doing so as the decade progressed. Thus by 1583 his debts were over 200,000 livres.

In January 1585, the king decreed that Richelieu, in his capacity as Grand Prévôt de l'Hôtel was to make weekly reports to him on any disorders that he had become aware of. This was to take place on Saturday mornings. On the Saturday, he also had priority of speech in the royal council to discuss the affairs of the court.

On 19 January of this month Richelieu proposed in council to make the rue de Louvre a closed off street, with a barrier to keep regular traffic away from the front of the royal palace. Henri acceded to this request, and Richelieu was charged with opening and closing the gate to provide access for the king's entourage.

=== Ligue Crisis ===
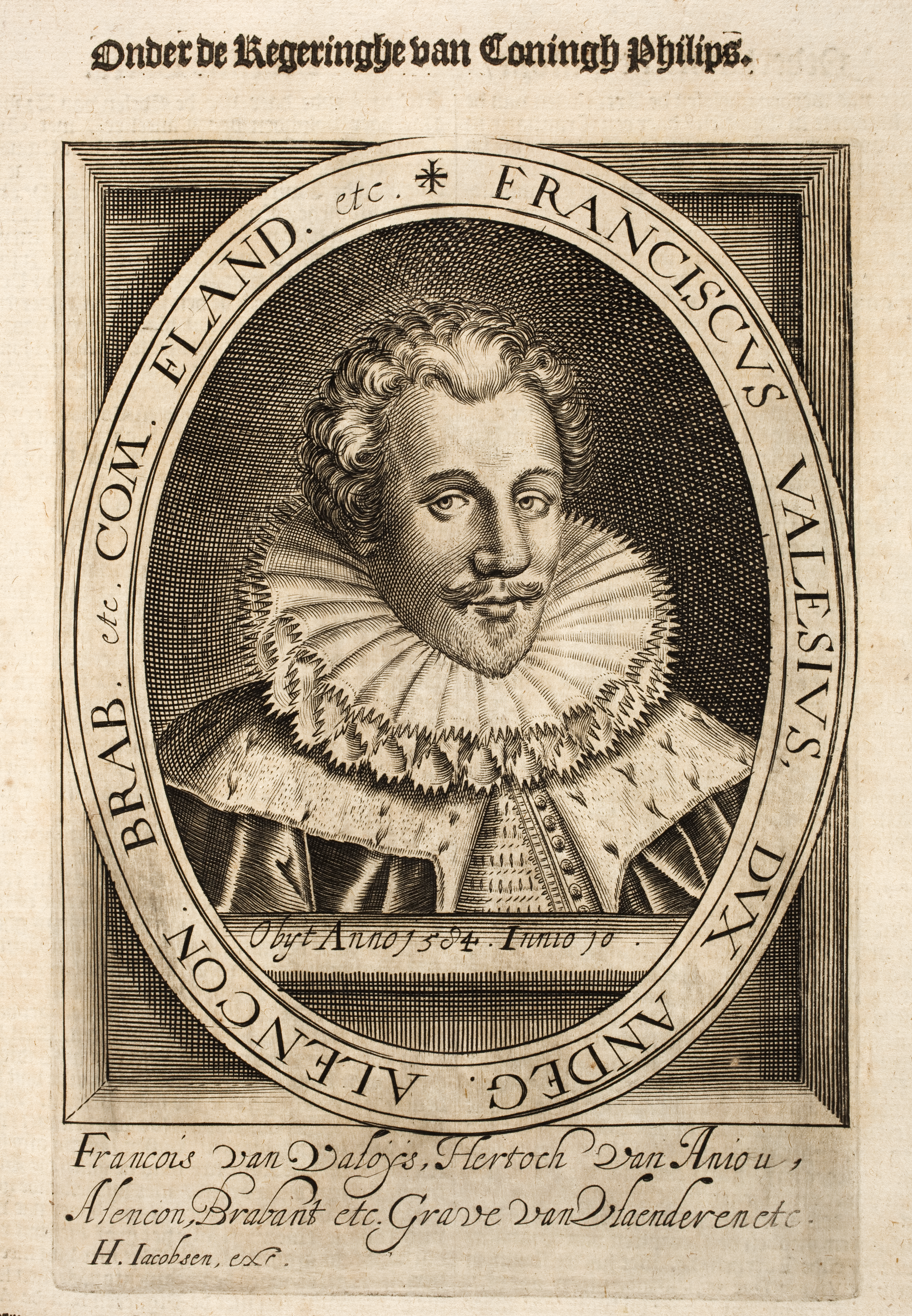
Engraving of the king's brother François de Valois, duke of Alençon

Back in 1584, Henri's brother Alençon died. Unfortunately for the king he had no children, and therefore the succession defaulted on his distant Protestant cousin Navarre. This was seized upon as a pretext by the duke of Guise and segments of allied nobility, who refounded the Catholic ligue to oppose his succession and a host of other royal policies.

In March 1585, the ligue entered open war with the crown. Several of Henri's former favourites rallied to the ligue camp, among them Saint-Luc and Beauvais-Nangis. Beauvais-Nangis was less enthused to join the ligue as an ally of the duke of Guise and more drawn to the organisation by his opposition to one of the king's paramount favourites Épernon. Richelieu was sympathetic to this reasoning and provided tacit support to Beauvais-Nangis during his brief time with the ligue before he became a royalist once more the following year.

During 1585, he would receive elevation to the new highest order of chivalry established by Henri, being made a chevalier de l'Ordre du Saint-Esprit in the intake of 1585.

=== Guise ===
Shortly before the convention of the Estates General of 1588, Guise sought to impose his authority as a great lord on the officers of state. As part of this he wrote to Richelieu, who served as seneschal of Saumur and maître de camp for the military of Poitou, imploring him in the 'name of the love he had for the duke' not to install a royal garrison in Saumur. Richelieu responded dryly that he only took orders from the king and the conseil d'État. Richelieu was introducing garrisons at this moment along the length of Loire on royal orders to block any potential advance by the Protestant Navarre after his victory at the Coutras. Guise however recognised that this could be a useful wedge issue to secure favour with towns, which had little desire to see royal troops in their walls. Henri was delighted that Richelieu had resisted the entreaties of Guise, praising him in a letter to the duke of Nevers as a dutiful and firm representative of the royal will.

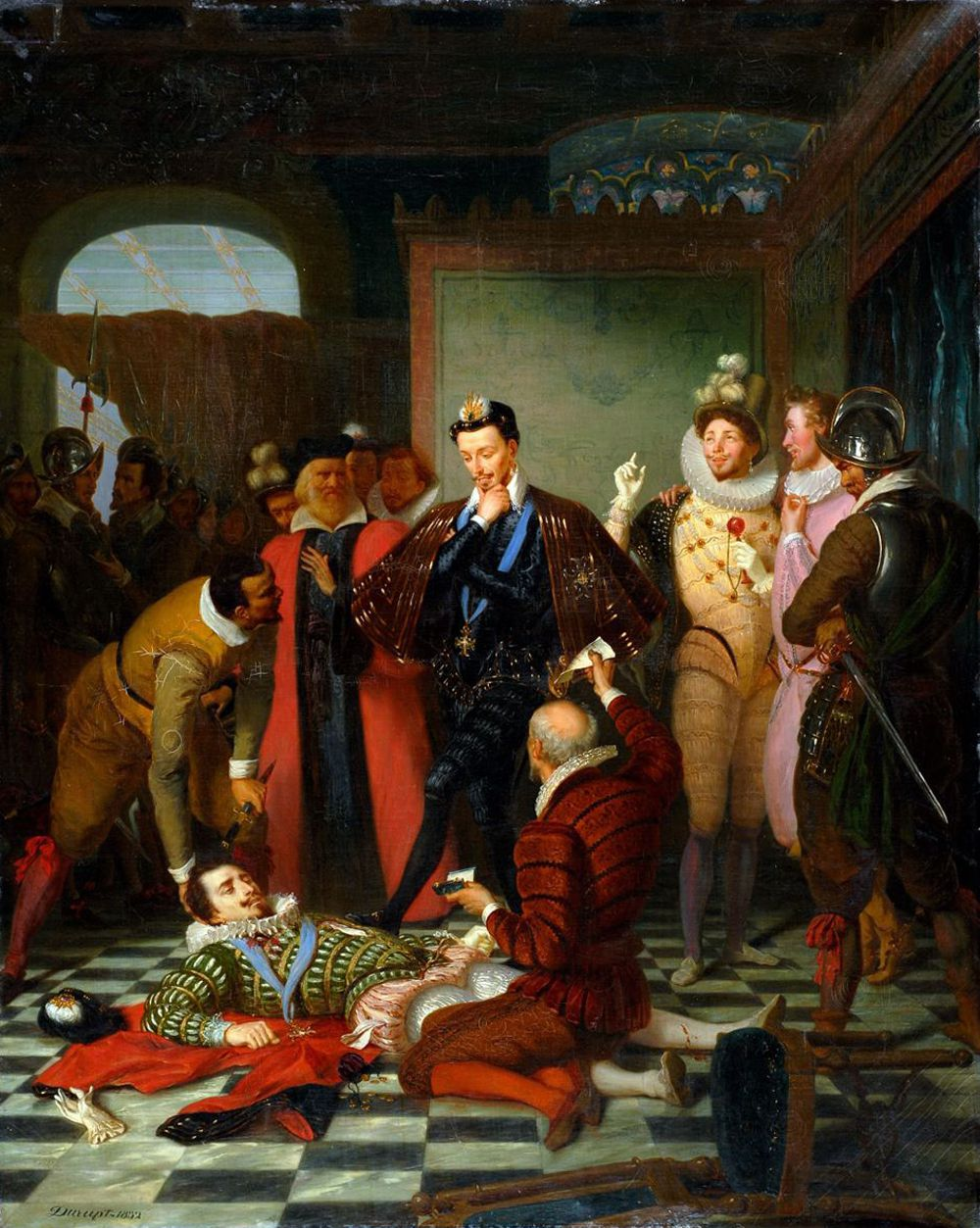
Assassination of Henri I, Duke of Guise, by Henri III, in 1588. Painting by Charles Durupt in the Château de Blois, where the attack took place.

Two hours after the assassination of the duke of Guise, Richelieu was tasked with taking the body of the duke from where it lay in the king's chamber and disposing of it. He took it to the ground floor where he burned the corpse, before scattering the ashes into the Loire. After this, he had the responsibility to sweep up and arrest leading allied members of the Estates General. Entering the hall of the Third Estate which was meeting at the Hôtel de Ville of Blois with a company of archers he shouted 'No one move! Someone wanted to kill the king!'. His men promptly arrested Neuilly a président in the Parlement, Michel Marteau the prévôt des marchands of Paris, Dorléans, Compan and Cotteblanche all Parisian échevins. In total eight ligueur members of the Third Estate were arrested by Richelieu, largely from the leadership of the Seize, the ligueur administration of Paris since the Day of the Barricades. He announced to them that two men had tried to kill the king and that they were to sit in judgement of these men. The men were led through the rain to the Château de Blois where Richelieu showed them the pools of blood in the king's bedchamber, where the duke of Guise had been cut down. They were then shown gallows that were being constructed nearby, however this was designed only to intimidate them the king would not have any of them killed. Shortly thereafter they were locked in a room inside the château. Concurrently to these arrests, others led the arrests of leading nobles, the duke of Nemours and Elbeuf were arrested by Bellegarde. Richelieu for his part was responsible for the arrest of the prince de Joinville, son of the late duke. By this means it was hoped to dampen any ligueur revenge for the assassination.

The Estates were largely cowed by the assassination and the arrests that had followed it. The Third Estate alone maintained some spirit of resistance, demanding the release of their colleagues that Richelieu had imprisoned. The following day, the king resolved that alongside the duke, he needed to assassinate his imprisoned brother the Cardinal de Guise. Richelieu would decline to perform this sacrilegious task, and the king eventually turned to a member of his bodyguard Michel de Gast to accomplish the deed.

=== France in rebellion ===
The assassination of the duke would however prompt a dramatic response across France, and not long thereafter half of the 50 largest cities in the country were in the hands of the ligue. In ligueur pamphlets, Richilieu was denounced as Tristan L'Hermite, a particularly notorious Prévôt of Louis XI for his role in the assassination. In Paris, the ligueur administration expelled all royalist members of the Paris Parlement, the judges travelling to form a counter-Parlement at Tours. Henri opened the Parlement in Tours on 23 March with a lit de justice, in attendance for this solemn inauguration were Richelieu, Cardinal Vendôme, captain of his guard Maintenon, Admiral of France Beauvais-Nangis among others.

In early 1589, Henri was sensitive to the ligueur influence in the city of Poitiers as a potential loss for the royalist cause. To work against this he dispatched René, come de Sanzay to the city to deliver a message urging the notables to remain loyal. The ligueur elements in the city posted an armed group of men outside his lodgings. Shortly after this Henri dispatched another series of representatives, this time composed of La Roche-Chemerault and Richelieu. Both of the men enjoyed positive relations with leading Poitevans. Their arrival was greeted frostily, with no delegation coming out of the city to welcome them.

Having arrived, La Roche-Chemerault and Richelieu set to work, they hoped to take control of the municipal council and reorganise the guard of the city. To this end they had a measure passed by which only men chosen by the governor and mayor could guard the gates. While this would provide limited effect in the short term, it accelerated a confrontation between royalists and ligueurs in the city. In May matters in the city reached a breaking point. The royalists in the city requested the support of the prince de Dombes in securing control of the city, meanwhile the ligueur elements of the city requested military support from the vicomte de La Guerche. An argument between two men of the city brought the violence to the streets before either would arrive, with the ligueurs throwing up barricades. During the fights over the barricades the royalist Sainte-Soline put his sword to the ligueur mayor Jean Palustre's throat and forced him to withdraw. During the night the ligueurs took control of key points in the city, including a bell tower that overlooked Sainte-Soline's residence. The following day he would be besieged in his hôtel. On 4 May at a secret ligueur assembly, it was agreed that they would resist the tyrants Richelieu and Malicorne the governor of Poitou. In response to these meetings, Richelieu and Malicorne ordered the execution of six Catholics. This proved the final collapse of royalist influence in Poitiers, with the executioners killed by a mob and Malicorne and Richelieu captured and imprisoned. They would be allowed to depart Poitiers shortly thereafter.

=== Assassination of Henri III ===
Richelieu would be with the king when he arrived at the Hôtel d'Aulny on 29 July. This was to be Henri's residence for the conduct of the siege of ligueur held Paris. Three days later, Henri was stabbed by Jacques Clément, he would die the following day. According to the memoires of the comte d'Auvergne Richelieu was among those who stood sorrowfully at the king's bedside as he died on 2 August. As Grand Prévot de l'Hôtel, it was Richelieu's responsibility to draw up the royal report on the assassination.

In the wake of the murder of the king, limited efforts would be made to bring the parties responsible for the assassination to justice. Richelieu received custody of Edme Bourgoing, the prieur of the Jacobin order, of which Clément was a member in Paris. Richelieu transported him to Tours where he was put on trial by the Parlement.

== Reign of Henri IV ==
=== Loyalist ===
With Henri dead, his heir was the Protestant Navarre, who styled himself Henri IV. Richelieu was among those lords who required some reassurances before swearing their loyalty to a Protestant king. Therefore, on 4 August, Henri swore that he would protect the Catholic faith and receive teaching in it at some point in the future. This was sufficient for some of the Catholic nobility, among them Richelieu, the lieutenant-general of Champagne Dinteville, Marshal Biron and Marshal D'Aumont.

=== Fighting the ligue ===
Henri was forced to retreat from Paris by the death of Henri III, falling back into Normandie. The lieutenant-general of the ligue followed him into Normandie, and brought him to battle at Arques where Henri was victorious. Richelieu fought with Henri at the battle, and again at the Battle of Ivry as Henri prepared to return to claim Paris. In March 1590 he was rewarded for his loyalty to the royalist cause by Henri IV with a gift of 60,000 livres. Accompany this gift was the honour of being made captain of Henri IV's guard. In the following months he would serve at the sieges of Vendôme, Le Mans, Alençon and Falaise. During Henri's siege of Paris he would die on 10 June at Gonesse.

Upon Richelieu's death in 1590, his estate was so riddled with debts that his wife refused to claim it.

== Sources ==
- Bernstein, Hilary (2004). Between Crown and Community: Politics and Civic Culture in Sixteenth-Century Poitiers. Cornell University Press.
- Carroll, Stuart (2011). Martyrs and Murderers: The Guise Family and the Making of Europe. Oxford University Press.
- Constant, Jean-Marie (1984). Les Guise. Hachette.
- Constant, Jean-Marie (1996). La Ligue. Fayard.
- Holt, Mack (2002). The Duke of Anjou and the Politique Struggle During the Wars of Religion. Cambridge University Press.
- Jouanna, Arlette (1998). Histoire et Dictionnaire des Guerres de Religion. Bouquins.
- Knecht, Robert (2010). The French Wars of Religion, 1559-1598. Routledge.
- Knecht, Robert (2016). Hero or Tyrant? Henry III, King of France, 1574-1589. Routledge.
- Pitts, Vincent (2012). Henri IV of France: His Reign and Age. Johns Hopkins University Press.
- Roberts, Penny (1996). A City in Conflict: Troyes during the French Wars of Religion. Manchester University Press.
- Le Roux, Nicolas (2000). La Faveur du Roi: Mignons et Courtisans au Temps des Derniers Valois. Champ Vallon.
- Le Roux, Nicolas (2006). Un Régicide au nom de Dieu: L'Assassinat d'Henri III. Gallimard.
- Salmon, J.H.M (1979). Society in Crisis: France during the Sixteenth Century. Metheun & Co.
- Wood, James (2002). The Kings Army: Warfare, Soldiers and Society during the Wars of Religion in France, 1562-1576. Cambridge University Press.
