= Assassination of Henri I, Duke of Guise =

Critical event in the French Wars of Religion

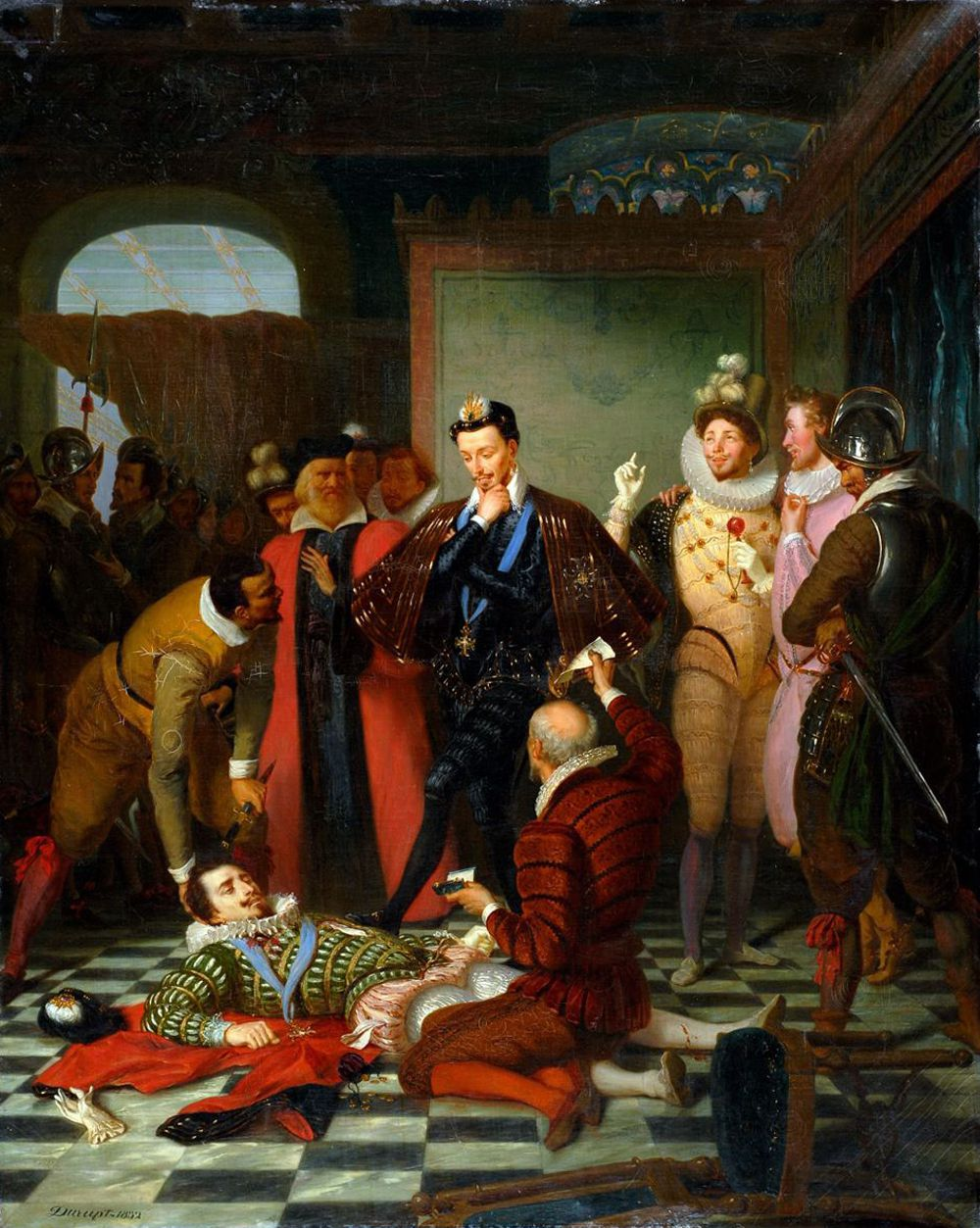
Assassination of Henri I, Duke of Guise, by Henri III, in 1588. Painting by Charles Durupt in the Château de Blois, where the attack took place.

On 23 December 1588, Henri I, Duke of Guise was assassinated by the Quarante Cinq serving King Henry III. The event was one of the most critical moments of the French Wars of Religion. The Duke had achieved, since 1584, considerable power over the Kingdom of France, through his alliance with the Catholic League, which he had co-opted for the cause of resisting the King's lawful successor to the throne: the future Henry IV — a Protestant. Despite some effort to resist Guise and the League, Henry III had been forced by his weak position to accede to their continued demands. After the Day of the Barricades in May 1588, the League expelled Henri from Paris, and Henri was forced to make Guise lieutenant general of the kingdom, call an Estates General and sign an Edict of Union in July which prohibited Henry of Navarre from succeeding to the throne and outlawed Protestantism in France. Increasingly unable to bear the humiliations Guise and the League forced upon him, he was further outraged by the Estates General. The body — largely League-dominated — rejected his attempt to chastise Guise for forming associations, diverted tax income to Guise's brother Mayenne and rejected all compromise with the King.

These indignities in combination with the increasingly cavalier attitude of much of the Guise family, who spoke of deposing him and interring him in a monastery, persuaded Henry to have the Duke killed. To accomplish this, he required a time when Guise was alone, something that could be accomplished only at a meeting of the council. Feigning an intention to leave Blois for Christmas, he persuaded Guise to come to a council meeting on 23 December. Guise received numerous warnings of the King's intentions for the meeting, but was unable to imagine that the pious and compliant Henry would dare touch him. Shortly after the meeting began, Guise was called away to meet the King. En route to the King he was attacked by several members of the King's bodyguard, the Quarante Cinq and murdered. His brother, the Cardinal of Guise and their ally Pierre de Saint-Priest d'Épinac, Archbishop of Lyon, heard the fight in the next room, but were apprehended before they could aid their friend and brother. While the King prevaricated over what to do with Cardinal Guise he eventually decided that the Cardinal's threats against him warranted his death, and he was murdered in his cell the following day. The two men were cremated to avoid their remains becoming martyr's relics then scattered into the Loire.

While the estates were quickly cowed from reacting with any fury to this royal coup, with the prominent League members in their midst arrested, the rest of France was not so easily quieted. The Seize which had controlled Paris since the Day of the Barricades declared that they would have their vengeance against the murderer of the princes. The organisation quickly moved to purge the Parlement of Paris of royalist sympathisers, making the body League dominated. The Sorbonne for its part, pre-empted a Papal declaration of Henri's excommunication for the murder of the Cardinal by declaring that all subjects were released from their oath of obedience, and that it was their duty to fight Henry III. Across the kingdom the majority of the fifty largest urban centres in the country defected to the Catholic League. In Paris the furious Catholic population destroyed any public monument, image or symbol that represented the King, while pamphleteers denounced him as a Herod, Nero and anti-Christ, with some going so far as to say that he should be killed. Pope Sixtus V for his part was furious at the murder of the Cardinal, and despite the King sending several representatives to convince him, threatened excommunication in thirty days unless Henry came to Rome to explain himself. Henry for his part made an alliance with Henry of Navarre, and the two set forth to reconquer Paris. Putting the city to siege on 29 July, Henry was assassinated by a radical Catholic friar, energised by the hatred in the city, on 1 August 1589.

== Crisis of the ligue ==
=== Quarante Cinq ===
In 1584 the Catholic League was re-founded by the Duke of Guise to advocate for Cardinal Bourbon to be the King's heir instead of the Protestant Henry of Navarre. King Henry, in the wake of this new League became increasingly concerned for his security. To this end he established a new body for his protection the Quarante Cinq. Its members were largely drawn from the clientele of his two chief favourites Anne de Joyeuse and Jean Louis de Nogaret de La Valette (Épernon). The King hoped that this body would provide him protection that he could trust, as he was increasingly uneasy with putting his security in the hands of the grandees of his court. The League denounced the Quarante Cinq as a bunch of disreputable Gascons, not worthy of holding such an important task. In May 1585 one of the Quarante Cinq was arrested for making an attempt on the King, and under duress falsely claimed that Charles I, Duke of Elbeuf cousin to the duke of Guise had paid him to assassinate the king.

=== Day of the Barricades ===
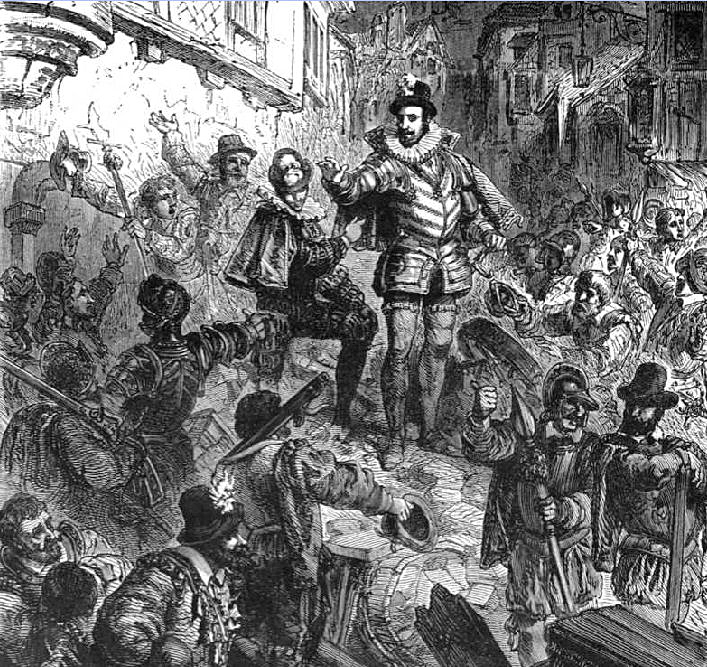
The Duke of Guise during the Day of the Barricades, by Paul Lehugeur, 19th century

After the Day of the Barricades in which Henry was forced to flee from Paris, leaving the duke of Guise ascendant in the city. Henry sought to regain the initiative at the calling of the Estates General at Blois that had been forced upon him by the state of royal finances.

Guise continued to exercise his strong hand, proposing that Épernon and La Valette should be condemned as Protestants and traitors. Épernon for his part had provided the King similar advice, back in April having argued that Guise should be executed. Henry was also receiving reports that there was internal division in the Guise clan, between the popular duke and his relatives, Mayenne, Elbeuf and Charles, Duke of Aumale who were jealous of the regard in which their cousin/brother was held.

=== Tense meeting ===
On 1 August 1588, Guise arrived at Chartres with a retinue of 800 horse to make his formal submission to the King. The people of Chartres emerged from their houses to cheer Guise, viewing him as their saviour from Protestantism. Kneeling before the King, Henry lifted him up and the two exchanged kisses. At a meal that evening the tension between the men became apparent when Guise asked Henry to whom they should toast, and Henry jokingly proposed the Protestants. Guise's friends warned him that the King had 'wicked designs' for him, but he dismissed the concerns, arguing that only if he was isolated in the King's chambers was he seriously at risk from Henry any more. For his part, he saw a reconciliation with the King as in his best interests, he was ill inclined to fully put himself at Spain's mercy as a client of Philip II, and was in such a position of ascendancy as little needing further confrontation. This was not the opinion of all members of his family, his sister Catherine argued that they should depose Henry and place him in a monastery, his brother Cardinal Guise tried to force his hand by seizing the town of Troyes. The King for his part continued to make conciliatory gestures, dismissing Épernon from his position in Normandy and making Guise lieutenant-general of the army.

=== Estates General of 1588 ===
Shortly before their convening, Henri remarked to Cardinal François de Joyeuse that the Estates would reveal to him whether Guise remained a servant, or if he was now an enemy. Guise and Henry campaigned vigorously for the selection of the delegates for the estates, the King performed slightly better than expected in the members of the first and second estate, partly as a result of personal interventions to ensure his candidate was chosen. However, in the third estate a uniformly 'League supporting list of delegates was returned.

The King was faced with a set of Estates almost uniformly dominated by League deputies despite these efforts. The first estate was led by Cardinal Guise and Cardinal Bourbon, the second by Marshal Charles II de Cossé, Duke of Brissac, and the third by La Chapelle-Marteau, who led the Seize League government in Paris. All these men were deeply invested in the 'League. The King, speaking before the estates, announced that through his July endorsement of the League's Edict of Union, all political associations were now banned in France. He made an oblique reference to 'some grandees' of his kingdom, who had in past years made leagues and associations. Henry promised that all these acts of the past were forgiven and forgotten, but he warned that any such activities in future would be considered treason. This represented a shot across the bow at Guise, who had re-founded the Catholic League in December 1584. Guise who was in the room became pale at these words, and after the session concluded for the day was chided by Cardinal Guise for having trusted in half measures. Bourbon and the Archbishop of Lyon successfully got these statements of the King excised from the published version of his speech. This was accomplished through the humiliating threat that the estates would depart if it was not done.

The estates countered the royal proposal for ecclesiastical land alienation, with the idea to farm venal office through the Luccan financier Scipio Sardini. The Estates went as far as to propose that the money raised through this program would not go to the King, but directly to the League generals Louis de Gonzague, Duke of Nevers, and Guise's brother Mayenne. The King was enraged that he was not even to have access to his own kingdom's tax revenue if the estates had their way.

The League deputies pressed the King to acknowledge that the Edict of Union, and Henry of Navarre's exclusion from succession were fundamental laws of the kingdom, as opposed to legislation he could simply abolish. Henry was evasive on this issue and distracted the deputies with a ceremony in which it was reaffirmed. The clergy were not happy with this, and demanded Navarre be condemned as a traitor but Henry was not keen to have him condemned, and gave the excuse that he had a right to defend himself, suggesting they send an embassy to meet with him.

While the estates were ongoing Charles Emmanuel I, Duke of Savoy invaded the French held Marquisate of Saluzzo in late October under the pretext of 'protecting the territory from heresy'. Henry sensed an opportunity to discredit Guise and the 'League, by emphasising that only he was willing to defend France's territorial rights, while Guise was allied with Savoy. However the League estates countered that they were happy to appoint leaders to command against Savoy in a war, on condition a war against heresy was maintained. Despite the King's conviction that Guise and the League had coordinated this action with Savoy, Guise had in fact declined overtures from the duke of Savoy to participate.

This unanimity made it harder for him to divide and conquer the estates, as he had been able to achieve more successfully in the Estates General of 1576. Henri believed that behind each one of their actions, the duke of Guise pulled the strings. This was despite the fact Guise was frustratedly trying to convince the Third Estate to support the raise in taxation necessary to fund a war against heresy and Navarre. He had to balance his divergent desires from his League base with his need for their support to provide him a power base. Guise found himself involved in a furious debate with La Chapelle-Marteau on 28 November where he urged the third estate to afford the King some financial relief but he was unable to shake the third estates resolve. His failure to deliver the compromise he had hoped for was a cause of significant embarrassment to Guise yet he was also compromised as an instigator of the third estates intransigence by his repeated secret meetings with its leaders.

Unable to sway the estates from their course Henry was faced with a radical alternative to reimpose his authority on the kingdom.

=== Point of no return ===
During November as the estates continued, Guise and Henry quarrelled over the matter of Orléans. Guise contended that the Edict of Union the King had given the League the city as a surety town. Henry contended that in fact the surety town he had granted was Doullens in Picardy. Unwilling for this to be the issue over which he broke with Guise, Henry backed down and granted them Orléans.

By December it was becoming increasingly apparent that the situation was approaching the point of no return. On 9 December at a council between Guise, his brother the Cardinal, several Guisard captains and the leading third estate League supporters, the majority of the council urged him to depart for the safety of Orléans. Guise followed the advice of the Archbishop of Lyon, who told him that retreating from Blois would be an admission of defeat. Guise for his part began to overplay his hand, so confident that the King would not move against him. He complained that the office of lieutenant-general was not enough any more.

At a family dinner on 17 December, Guise's brother in an indiscreet moment, offered a toast to his brother, referring to him as the King. His sister, Catherine followed this up with a joke about 'using her scissors' a reference to the way Merovingian kings were tonsured. An Italian actor, Venetianelli, present at the dinner reported on what he had heard to the King, further enraging Henry, who was already at his breaking point with Guise.

== Assassination ==
=== Planning ===
Henri resolved that he could no longer bear the hold that the Guise had over him, and decided, on 19 December to assassinate the Duke. The decision was made in a council Henri conducted with his most trusted advisors, Jean VI d'Aumont, Nicolas d'Angennes, Marquis de Rambouillet, his brother Louis d'Angennes, Seigneur de Maintenon and Marshal Alphone d'Ornano, execution was agreed as the course of action 3-1. According to Guise's secretary Péricard, Henry arrived at the decision shortly after the secret visit of the League governor of Orléans, Entragues, who assured the King of his loyalty. Agrippa d'Aubigne for his part argues that the decision was a product of being emboldened by news of the failure of the Spanish Armada. The details of the plan were fleshed out on 20 December, with the deed to be entrusted to the Quarante Cinq, Henry's bodyguard. Guise was always well guarded so it would be necessary to separate him from his entourage, meetings of the conseil privé were the only circumstance where this could be guaranteed. As Grand Master of France, Guise normally had possession of the keys to the château every evening. To circumvent this problem, Henry announced that he would shortly be retiring to La Noue, which afforded him an excuse to keep hold of them.

This plot could not remain secret, and on 21 December the Papal Nuncio warned Guise to quickly depart from Blois. In the following 48 hours he received warnings to a similar affect from his mother the duchess of Nemours and the duke of Elbeuf his cousin. On the morning of 23 December he left the chambers of his mistress only to be handed five notes to much the same affect, he confidently confided to his surgeon that the King wouldn't dare to touch him, 'I would never get anything done if I listened to all these warnings' he remarked.

=== Final meetings ===
Back on 21 December, the King and Guise held discussions for several hours in the gardens of the Château. Guise complained that the King was misinterpreting his actions, and he was making efforts to win his trust. He further announced his intention to the King to resign the office of lieutenant-general. This confirmed in Henry's mind that Guise desired the office of Constable of France, and after returning from their walk to his cabinet he exploded with rage. Rumours swirled at Blois of various plots to kidnap the King on the one hand and kill the Duke on the other.

The two men met for one last time on 22 December in the chambers of Catherine. They exchanged sweetmeats and were at least on the surface polite with one another. As Guise moved to depart, Henry informed him that there was much business to discuss at council, and while he could not be there himself, he desired Guise to attend the morning session and report on the decisions reached to him.

=== 23 December ===
The King for his part awoke at 04:00 on 23 December, after having rendezvoused with Bellegarde and du Halde in his cabinet to go over the details of the plan. He then set about an inspection of the Quarante Cinq in the Galerie des Cerfs, being sure to remind them that this was a matter of either his death or Guise's. Eight of them, led by Loignac were instructed to take up positions in the royal chamber, arming themselves with long daggers. The King then went to receive Mass in his oratory. At 07:00 he sent Aumont, D'O and Rambouillet to the council chamber in preparation for the morning session. The King was filled with nerves for the upcoming council meeting and paced his chambers until he received word of Guise's arrival. The preparations of the Quarante Cinq generated a not inconsiderable amount of noise, and Guise's secretary Péricard awoke him around 04:00 to alert him, but Guise reassured him that the noise was simply the preparations the King was undertaking for his departure to La Noue, and returned to bed. He was at last risen at 08:00, the late hour of his rise forcing him to skip breakfast and his lever and hurry to answer the King's summons to come to council.

Arriving at council Guise was once more accosted, this time by a gentleman from Auvergne named La Sale who warned him to go no further as he was at risk of his life, Guise sarcastically thanked him 'My good friend, it's a long time since I have been healed of that apprehension'. A family retainer then approached him with similar warnings and Guise angrily rebuked him as a fool and brushed him aside.

He entered the council chambers with his brother and the Archbishop of Lyon, to find the King absent from the deliberations. They were informed that he was working privately in an adjacent chamber. Guise was taken back by the presence of Aumont, and Captain Larchant as he was not accustomed to seeing them attend sessions. Larchant explained to him that he was there to solve a matter of wages for his men, but he could offer no explanation for Aumont's presence. Guise agreed to provide the wages Larchant demanded. Guise warmed himself in front of the fire, the weather outside having been terrible and requested Péricard fetch him some breakfast, his preferred dish could not be found, so he sated himself on Provençal prunes provided by Saint-Prix, the King's valet. Larchant's men, refused Péricard's attempts to reunite with his lord, keeping him prisoner in an antechamber. Guise complained of the cold and asked for more logs to be put on the fire. His nose began to bleed and Saint-Prix departed to fetch him a handkerchief. Business soon got under way discussing financial matters, before the secretary of state Revol entered and moved over to the Duke.

Revol was unused to the kind of mission he had been asked to conduct, and had very pallid cheeks which caused the King to remark 'You're so pale! You'll ruin everything! Rub your cheeks'. He nervously whispered in Guise's ear that the King desired his presence. Picking up his gloves, with the bloody handkerchief still in hand he offered a bow to the council chamber and bid them adieu. Knocking on the door to the King's chambers he was allowed entry. He observed a squad of the Quarante Cinq across the room and greeted them, they replied in their regular fashion with a salute and moved to surround him, to accompany him to the King. As Guise reached the door to the King's chamber he turned to face the nearest member of the Quarante Cinq, Montséry who, fearing that Guise was about to draw a weapon pulled a dagger and grabbing the Duke's arm plunged it into his breast with a cry of 'Traitor, you will die for it!' D'Effranants joined in the attack lunging at the Duke's legs to hold him in place while Sainte-Malines delivered the killing blow to the Duke's throat. Loignac put a thrust of his sword into Guise's kidney. One final blow came to his back delivered by Sariac. Guise struggled with his attackers, begging for mercy, calling for assistance and slowly progressing across the room despite D'Effranant's hold on his legs before collapsing at the foot of the King's bed. His cries of 'Oh! What treachery!' 'My God! Have Pity!' were heard in the main chamber.

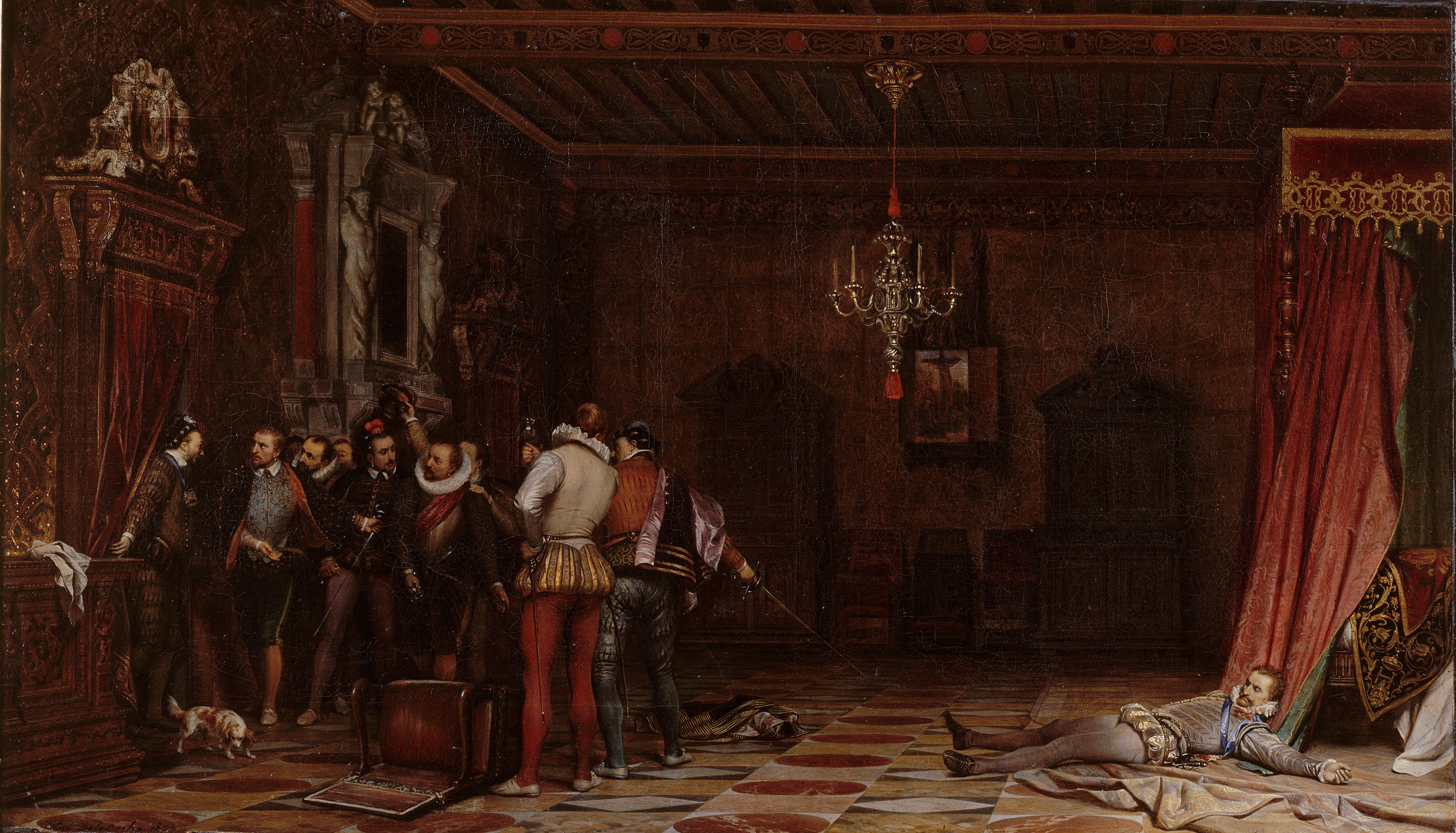
Painting of the Assassination by Paul Delaroche - 19th century

Cardinal Guise and the Archbishop of Lyon, who could hear the sound of the struggle from the council chamber were startled, Cardinal Guise rose from his seat knocking the chair back and had to be restrained by four councillors from bursting through the door. Aumont put his hand on his sword, and warned the two men from trying anything further. They told him the King had to be obeyed. He and the Archbishop were promptly arrested in the following minutes.

=== Catherine ===
Having accomplished this act, Henry went to his mother Catherine de' Medici's chambers, finding her in bed still ill, with a doctor by her side. He announced to her that he had overseen the killing of the Duke. Reciting for her the various slights that had been made against him since May, and emphasising that he wished to 'be a king, not a prisoner or slave'. He further informed her that Cardinal Guise, Bourbon and the Archbishop of Lyon were all under arrest, and that he bore no ill will to the dukes of Elbeuf, Nemours and Lorraine. Catherine's response is not recorded by Cavriana, according to the Venetian ambassador Mocenigo she assented to his actions on the understanding that they benefited the security of the state. However, in a conversation with a Capuchin friar on 25 December she bemoaned the trouble her son had brought upon the kingdom. In the Parisian imagination, she had signed off on the decision to execute the duke of Guise, as such the Seize announced if her sepulchre was brought to the Basilica of Saint-Denis, they would throw it into the river.

=== Navarre ===
News reached Henry of Navarre on 26 December. While many nobles in his entourage celebrated the death of their hated enemies, some denounced King Henry for his 'treachery' and 'cowardice'. Navarre for his part observing this split of opinion lamented the death of his cousins but observed that the King had a just reason to act the way he did.

=== Cardinal de Guise ===
Alongside the murder of the Duke, eight members of his close family and allies were arrested and imprisoned at Blois. Among them were Anna d'Este, Duchess of Nemours, and Charles, Prince of Joinville, Guise's son. Cardinal Guise had been interrogated throughout 23 December, quizzed as to the true intentions of the League. Under duress he admitted that the League's true objective was the arrest of the King, led by the duke of Nevers. After some consideration, Henry very anxious about the religious ramifications of killing a Cardinal settled upon the decision to kill the Cardinal of Guise alongside his brother. He had originally desired to spare both Cardinal Guise and the Archbishop of Lyon, but remembering the threats the Cardinal had made to him, he settled on sparing only Lyon. The Cardinal was killed in the cell in which he was being kept, the vast majority of the Quarante Cinq refused the sacrilegious task of killing a Cardinal and Henri had to coax one of his most faithful gentleman, Michel de Gast to conduct the deed. He butchered the Cardinal in his cell, with the assistance of six soldiers who had to be compensated with 200 livres a piece, the men using halberds to cut the Cardinal to pieces. A devout man, Henry sought absolution from his personal confessor for the act the following morning, and was promptly absolved.

Conscious of the martyrdom that had built up around Guise's father, the two bodies were burnt and their ashes scattered to the wind. Richelieu having brought Guise's body up to the first floor to be burned immediately after the killing on 23 December. With the ashes blown away into the Loire Henri departed to attend Christmas mass. Cavriana offers a different account, asserting that the two men were given anonymous burials in an obscure village.

On 1 December, Catherine visited the imprisoned Cardinal de Bourbon, who she had long considered a friend. She wanted to inform him that the King forgave him for his indiscretions, and that he would shortly be set free. Bourbon was however in a fighting mood, and rounded on the elderly Catherine, telling her 'Your words Madam, have led us all to this butchery.' Catherine departed in tears.

== Aftermath ==
=== Estates cowed ===
News of the assassination achieved one of its objectives, that being to bring the estates into line. Richelieu, the grand prêvot entered the chamber where the third estate were deliberating with a company of archers. Richelieu announced to the assembled delegates 'No one move! Someone wanted to kill the King!'. La Chapelle-Marteau, Louis Dorléans and other prominent League supporters were escorted from the chamber for arrest in the Château of Blois. They were shown the pool of blood were Guise had fallen in the Château and then allowed to overhear an order that gallows were being constructed. However, there was no plan to kill them, the goal was simply to intimidate the third estate League supporters. Brissac, who led the second estate was also arrested. The rump estates, now purged of the League leadership continued for another three weeks until 15/16 January, they did not collectively question the legality of the King's actions. The third estate alone however remained rebellious, arguing against the imprisonment of La Chapelle-Marteau and their other colleagues, and continuing to demand the purging from the royal government of corrupt officials.

=== Seize ===
However it spectacularly failed in all other regards. The Seize which effectively ruled Paris substituted new members to replace those who were now in captivity (La Chapelle-Marteau, Compagns and Cotteblanche) and vowed to expend all resources and blood to avenge the fallen princes. They further appointed the duke of Aumale as governor of the city.

=== Church ===
The Sorbonne declared that Henri had in this tyrannical act, abdicated his right to the throne. All his subjects were absolved of their loyalty to him, and armed resistance was a righteous act. This pre-empted any declaration from the Pope excommunicating the King over the murder of the Cardinal, but was issued in anticipation that this would soon follow. For the legal minded League supporters it was the murder of the Cardinal which was the more tactically advantageous crime, as they were able to argue this incurred an automatic excommunication before even the Pope had declared one. As early as 24 December, Henry met with the Papal legate Morosini, to explain the necessity of the actions he had taken. Morosini replied that they were a 'grave error'. Morosini informed the King that he had violated the Papal bull In Cena Domini which protected ecclesiastics, and that he needed to seek absolution immediately. Henry responded that the kings of France could not be excommunicated. While Morosini had the power to excommunicate Henry himself, he preferred to wait on the decision of the Pope. In February 1589 Henry dispatched the loyal Cardinal Joyeuse and Claude d'Angennes to Rome to explain the deaths to the Pope. They argued that the King had been forced to ignore the special status of the Cardinal due to the immediacy of the threat that was looming against him. In a heated exchange Joyeuse defended the killings before being interrupted by Pope Sixtus V who cried that this was not the way to deal with men of such quality, that Guise should have been arrested and his brother sent to Rome. Joyeuse reminded the Pope that he had once remarked that in the wake of the Day of the Barricades that Henri should throw Guise from a window of the Louvre Palace. The Pope insisted the Cardinals provide a request from the King for pardon. The two men did not have such a request on them, and agreed to forge one, in the hopes of delaying a bull excommunicating Henry. In July Sixtus obliged the League, demanding that Henry come to Rome to explain his actions within 30 days, or face excommunication. Henry was distraught by the news from Rome, bemoaning to Navarre that men who had done far worse than him had never been excommunicated, and that he had always been a good Catholic. Navarre retorted bluntly that those men had been victorious, and if he wanted his Catholicism vindicated, he would have to recapture his kingdom. Before the King could be excommunicated, he would be killed.

=== Preachers and pamphleteers ===
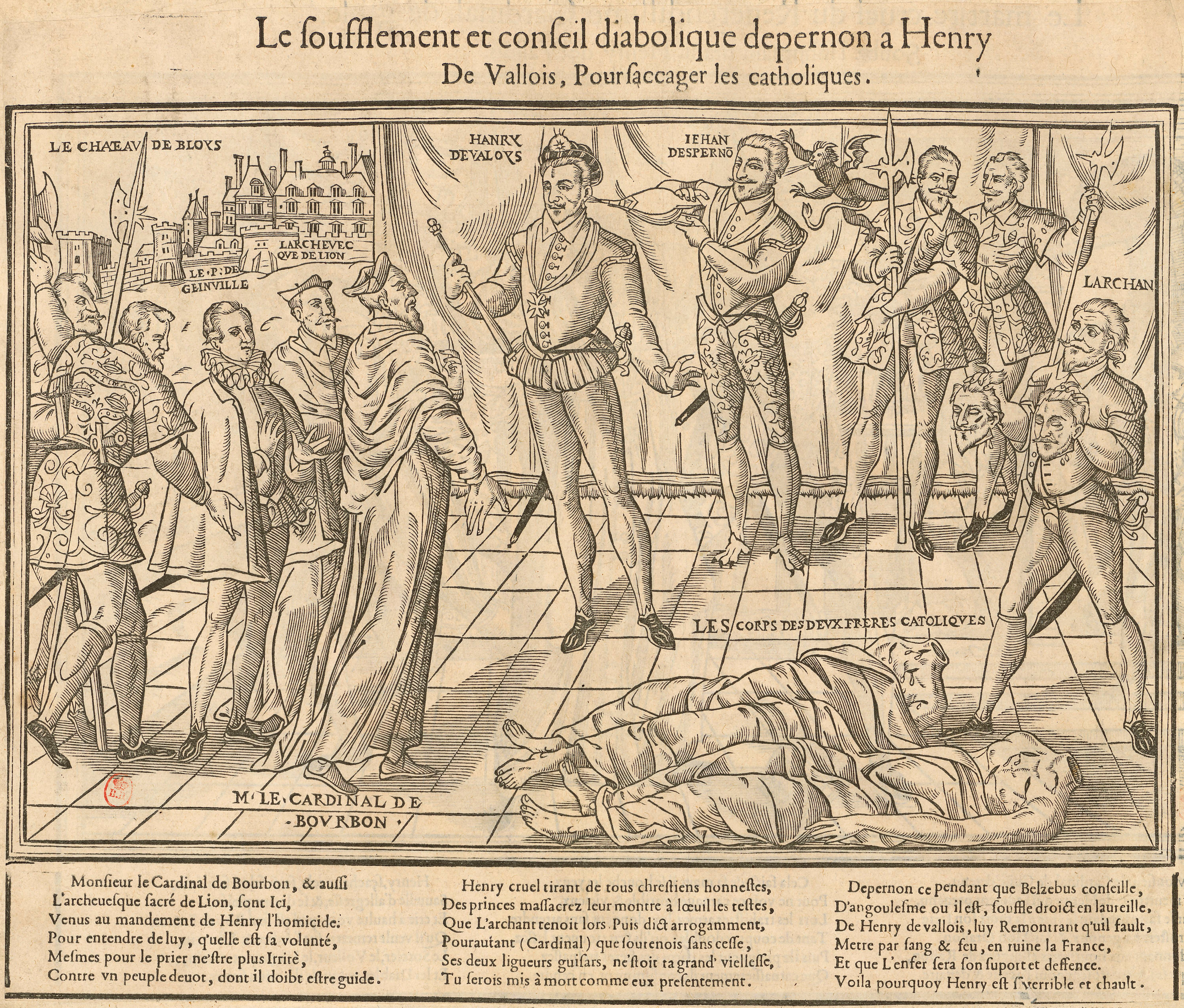
Polemical image denouncing Henri and Épernon for their roles in killing the duke and his brother.

The Tuscan ambassador, saw the death of the King's brother François, Duke of Anjou as the original cause both of the strife of the years 1584-1588, and of the assassination of Guise, bemoaning that it was the 'ruin of France'. Preachers in Paris denounced Henry as the new Herod. Others chose to characterise the King as a more perennial enemy of Christians, the anti-Christ. Where previously League pamphleteers had attacked the King by proxy, denouncing his wicked advisors, such as Épernon, who were leading the kingdom astray, the murder of the Duke turned their full attentions to the 'tyrant'. Some pamphlets went further, arguing that not only had 'Henry of Valois' (as they now styled him), sacrificed his rights to his office through his act, but further that he was now worthy of death. Jean Boucher was one such Parisian pamphleteer who advocated for this course, summarising his arguments in The Just Deposition of Henri III in early 1589. More pamphlets still compared him to historic tyrants through history, such as Nero and Caligula, and implied that his religious devotion was in fact a cover for black masses and various sorceries.

=== Parlement ===
The Seize denounced the Parlement of Paris as overly sympathetic to the hated Henry. Indeed, judges such as Jacques Auguste de Thou and Étienne Pasquier were sympathetic to the assassinations and arrests, and had formulated apologia for their actions, though they stopped short of a formal endorsement. The Seize went further however, accusing the body of plotting to hand over the capital to Henry of Navarre. Royalist inclined judges were purged, and the body became entirely League composed. Now imprisoned in the Bastille, the notion of trading the royalist judges to the King for the release of the League deputies who were held at Blois was floated. With Mayenne's arrival in the capital in March, many of the royalist Parlementaires were released. They flocked to the King in his makeshift capital at Tours where Henri had established an alternative Parlement for the loyalist deputies.

=== France ===
A wave of towns defected from the crown, including Rouen, Reims and Toulouse. In total a little over half of the fifty largest cities in France defected to the League. Though in general the situation was an unmitigated disaster for Henry, several towns, such as Châlons-sur-Marne took the opportunity of the assassination to formally break with the League and return to loyalty to the crown, expelling the League representatives from their towns.

The Seize in Paris, sent out letters to all the League controlled cities and towns, outlining their intentions to make war on the King in favour of the true king, god. Hatred of Henry exploded across France. Pierre de L'Estoile, a Parisian diarist records that the sheets were filled with shouts of 'Murder!' 'Vengeance!'. Services were held across France in honour of the two princes of Lorraine, with lamentations and mourning for the people. Paris was subject to processions, as on Mardi Gras where hundreds of naked children marched through the streets barefoot, holding candles. In early January, a furious Parisian mob, destroyed the elaborate tombs Henry had created for those of his favourites that had died in the Duel of the Mignons in 1578 and defaced any images of the King they could find in the streets. His coat of arms were throne into the gutter and trampled upon. On 7 February huge crowds assembled for the baptism of Guise's posthumous son, who was acclaimed as having had his hands clasped in prayer when his swaddling cloth was removed.

Henry tried to put out his version of events, arguing in letters to Rouen that he had continually showed clemency to the evil designs brought against him by the Guise but they had reached a point of boldness in their conspiracies that he had no choice but to punish them. Specifically he accused the Guise of having plotted to depose and kill him, making his acts simply self defence. The League supporters of Paris meanwhile provided their take, that Henry had violated his oath to protect the Catholic church, and that only rebellion would save it. This message proved decisive, and the city defected.

== 1589 ==
=== End of the Quarante Cinq ===
Henry no longer trusted the Quarante Cinq to be loyal enough to protect him from assassins, and replaced them. Eight trusted nobles were now to accompany him at all times, serving in two groups of four, eating their meals alongside him and sleeping as close as possible to afford him security. Each was granted two pistols and five horses. Henry's current chief favourite Bellegarde was to lead the group, and he was given the title of Grand Squire of France to provide him appropriate prestige.

=== Loose ends ===
The government of Champagne was made vacant by the death of Guise, and the King appointed Louis de Gonzague, Duke of Nevers to the role. He accepted on 18 January 1589, on the condition that the office be formally granted to his son Charles de Gonzague, while he would exercise the de facto responsibilities of the office. Mayenne, taking leadership for the League, appointed the captive Prince of Joinville, son of the late duke to the office. Due to his captivity, League authority over Champagne would be represented by the two lieutenant-generals Chrétien de Savigny and Antoine de Saint-Paul.

=== New friends ===
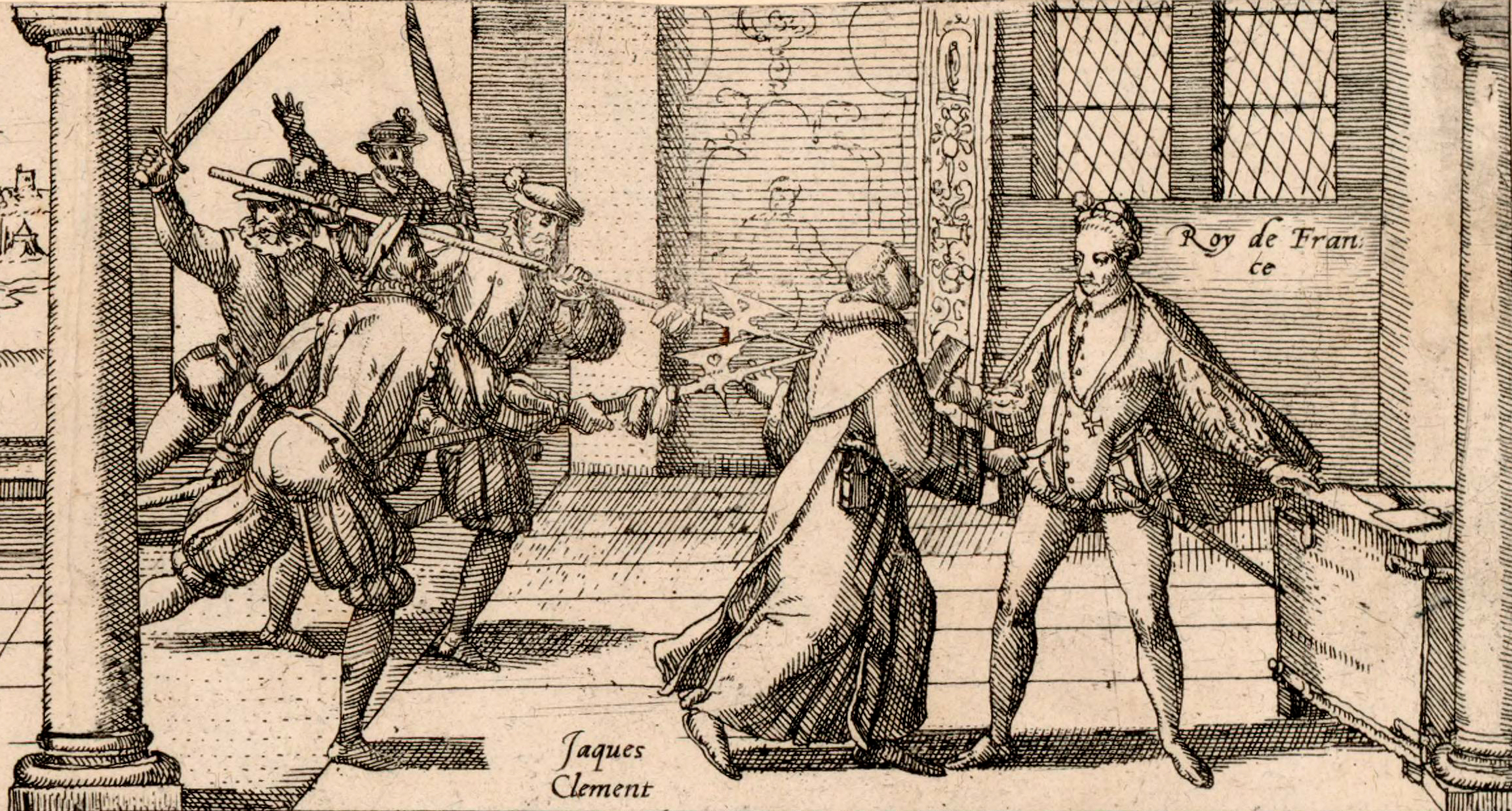
The assassination of Henry III by Clément

With much of his kingdom falling to the League, Henri was left with little choice but to turn to the Protestant Henry of Navarre for support. The two men entered formal compact on 3 April 1589. Conscious that this opened him up to even more radical Catholic attacks, it was worded very cautiously. The declaration was filled with Catholic language and expressed Henry's hope that Navarre would convert to Catholicism shortly. The two kings marched on Paris, capturing Senlis in May and Pontoise in July en route, before approaching Paris from two directions. In a skirmish near Tours, one of the Quarante Cinq who had killed the Duke was slain. His body was mutilated and his head severed to be displayed in Paris for his crime. By 30 July the city was under siege. Inside the city, hatred of the Valois entered a frenzy, with repeated calls for the death of Henry and Navarre. On 1 August 1589, a radical Catholic friar Jacques Clément, inspired by all the discourses calling for the King's death, arranged a meeting with him under the false pretence of bringing a message from allies in the capital, and stabbed him in the abdomen. Many Catholic League members celebrated the killing of the 'tyrant' who had assassinated Guise.

Ultimately the Catholic League was defeated by the new Henry IV by a mixture of military force and conciliation, with the new king converting to Catholicism to secure his throne.

== Bibliography ==
- Babelon, Jean-Pierre (2009). Henri IV. Fayard. ISBN 978-2-2136-4402-8.
- Baumgartner, Frederic (1986). Change and Continuity in the French Episcopate: The Bishops and the Wars of Religion 1547-1610. Durham: Duke University Press. ISBN 0-8223-0675-1.
- Benedict, Philip (2003). Rouen during the Wars of Religion. Cambridge University Press. ISBN 0-521-22818-2.
- Bernstein, Hilary (2004). Between Crown and Community: Politics and Civic Culture in Sixteenth-Century Poitiers. Cornell University Press. ISBN 0-8014-4234-6.
- Carroll, Stuart (2005). Noble Power During the French Wars of Religion: The Guise Affinity and the Catholic Cause in Normandy. Cambridge University Press. ISBN 0-521-62404-5.
- Carroll, Stuart (2011). Martyrs and Murderers: The Guise Family and the Making of Europe. Oxford University Press. ISBN 0-19-922907-4.
- Chevallier, Pierre (1985). Henri III: Roi Shakespearien. Fayard. ISBN 2-213-01583-X.
- Cloulas, Ivan (1979). Catherine de Médicis. Fayard. ISBN 2-213-00738-1.
- Harding, Robert (1978). Anatomy of a Power Elite: the Provincial Governors in Early Modern France. Yale University Press. ISBN 0-300-02202-6.
- Holt, Mack (2002). The Duke of Anjou and the Politique Struggle During the Wars of Religion. Cambridge University Press. ISBN 0-521-89278-3.
- Holt, Mack P. (2005). The French Wars of Religion, 1562-1629. Cambridge University Press. ISBN 0-521-35873-6.
- Holt, Mack (2020). The Politics of Wine in Early Modern France: Religion and Popular Culture in Burgundy 1477-1630. Cambridge University Press. ISBN 1-108-47188-9.
- Jouanna, Arlette (1998). Histoire et Dictionnaire des Guerres de Religion. Bouquins. ISBN 2-221-07425-4.
- Knecht, Robert (2010). The French Wars of Religion, 1559-1598. Routledge. ISBN 1-408-22819-X.
- Knecht, Robert (2014). Catherine de' Medici. Routledge. ISBN 0-582-08241-2.
- Knecht, Robert (2016). Hero or Tyrant? Henry III, King of France, 1574-1589. Routledge. ISBN 1-032-92098-X.
- Konnert, Mark (1997). Civic Agendas & Religious Passion: Châlon-sur-Marne during the French Wars of Religion 1560-1594. Sixteenth Century Essays & Studies. Vol. XXXV. Sixteenth Century Journal Publishers Inc. ISBN 0-940474-37-9.
- Konnert, Mark (2006). Local Politics in the French Wars of Religion: The Towns of Champagne, the Duc de Guise and the Catholic League 1560-1595. Ashgate. ISBN 978-0-7546-5593-0.
- Pitts, Vincent (2012). Henri IV of France: His Reign and Age. Johns Hopkins University Press. ISBN 1-4214-0578-4.
- Roberts, Penny (1996). A City in Conflict: Troyes during the French Wars of Religion. Manchester University Press. ISBN 0-7190-4694-7.
- Roberts, Penny (2013). Peace and Authority during the French Religious Wars c.1560-1600. Palgrave Macmillan. ISBN 1-349-45994-1.
- Roelker, Nancy (1996). One King, One Faith: The Parlement of Paris and the Religious Reformation of the Sixteenth Century. University of California Press. ISBN 0-520-08626-0.
- Salmon, J.H.M (1975). Society in Crisis: France during the Sixteenth Century. Metheun & Co. ISBN 0-510-26351-8.
- Sutherland, Nicola (1980). The Huguenot Struggle for Recognition. Yale University Press. ISBN 0-300-02328-6.
