= Estates General of 1588 =

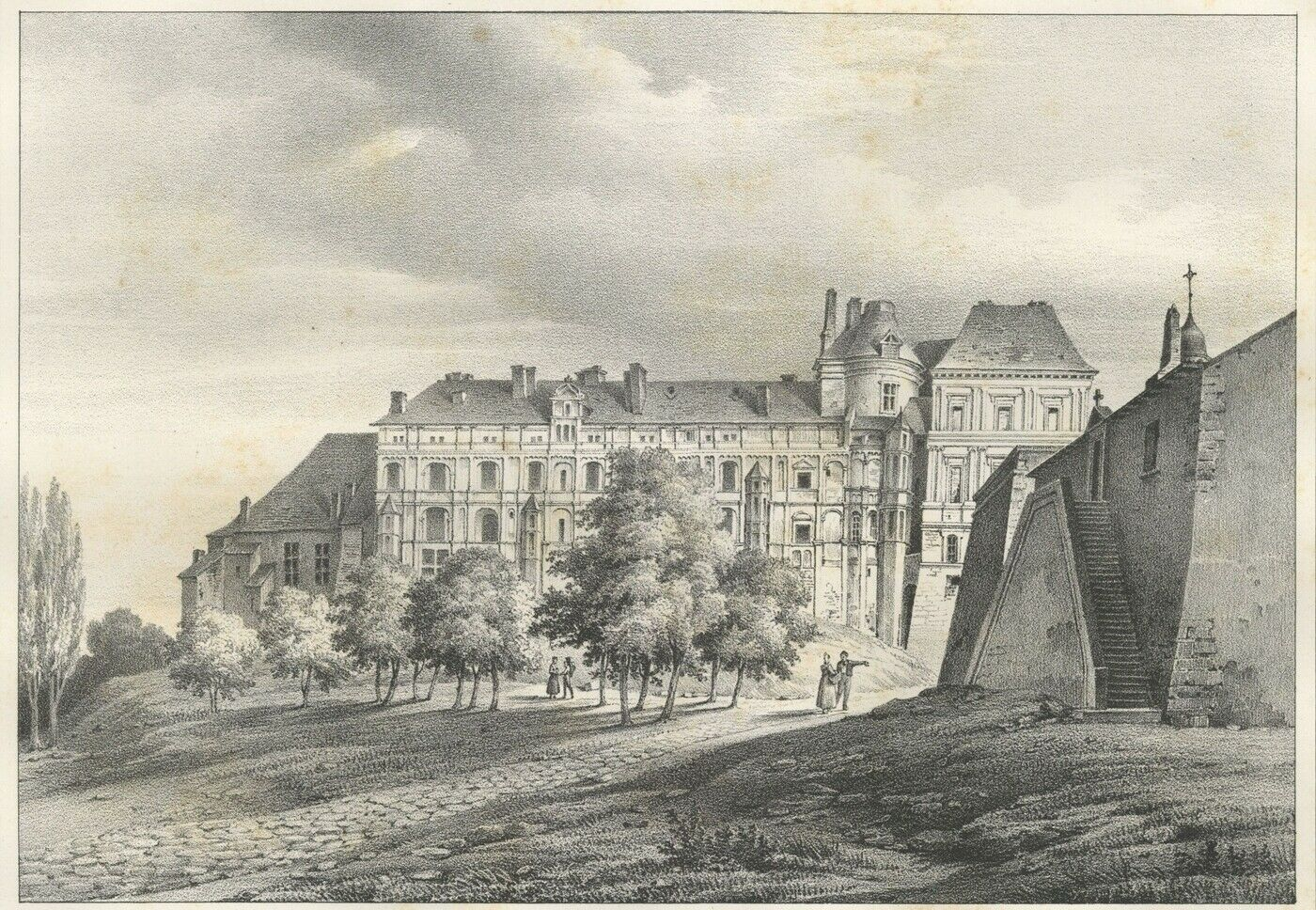
The Château of Blois, where the Estates would meet

The Estates General of 1588 was a national meeting of the three orders of France; the clergy, nobility and common people. Called as a part of the concessions Henri III made to the Catholic ligue in the aftermath of the Day of the Barricades, the Estates were formerly convoked on 28 May. Initially intended to begin in September, the meeting would be delayed until October. While he waited for the Estates to begin Henri dismissed all his ministers, replacing them with largely unknown men. The election of delegates witnessed an unusually bitter campaign, as both Henri and the leaders of the ligue, represented by Henry I, Duke of Guise competed to get deputies loyal to them selected, with the ligue seeing considerably more success than the king. On 16 October the Estates officially opened, and quickly the ligueur deputies imposed their will on the king, forcing him to reaffirm the concessions he had made in July. Matters soon turned to finance, with the Third Estate taking the lead in combining an advocacy for war against Protestantism with a refusal to countenance any raising of taxes. Indeed, they proposed a wide-ranging series of radical reforms that would have reduced Henri to the status of a constitutional monarch. In late October, the duke of Savoie invaded the French territory of the Marquisate of Saluzzo. After some initial success, the Estates refused to approve for a war against the duke.

Humiliated and frustrated by the continued defiance of the Estates, and seeing the hand of the duke of Guise behind their every act of resistance, Henri resolved to cut the head of the ligue by assassinating the duke of Guise. On 23 December the duke was lured into a side chamber and cut to pieces, his brother was executed the following day. While this radical coup had a chilling effect on the Estates, aided by the arrest of a series of leading members of the Estates, a degree of defiance among the Third Estate continued, with proposals for a tribunal of leading financiers in early January. On 16 January Henri brought the Estates to a close. They had been a failure, and by now his assassination of the duke of Guise had brought France into civil war, with the majority of French cities including Paris declaring themselves in insurrection against him. In a difficult position he was forced into alliance with his Protestant cousin Navarre in an effort to take back his kingdom.

== Crisis of royal authority ==
=== Day of the Barricades ===
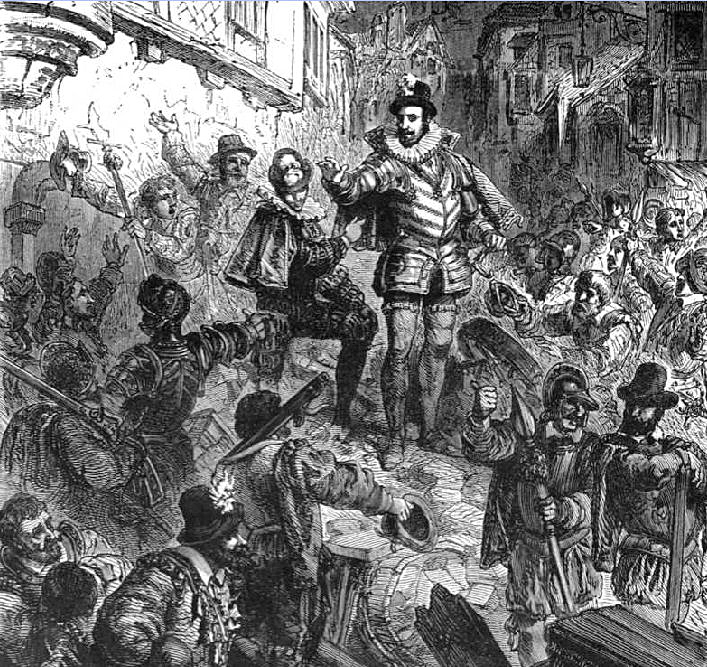
The Duke of Guise during the Day of the Barricades, by Paul Lehugeur, 19th century

By May 1588, Henri was ready for a showdown with the Catholic ligue and introduced troops into the capital, hoping to suppress their partisans in the city. His plan backfired, and militant elements of the population began rioting. The riot was quickly harnessed by the aristocratic members of the ligue, with the duke of Brissac leading a force of students and monks against the soldiers, driving them back across the city. Henri, increasingly alarmed decided he had little choice but to flee the capital, leaving it in the hands of the duke of Guise and the ligue, who quickly instituted a revolution in the cities administration.

=== Concessions ===
After the humiliation of the Day of the Barricades, Henri was forced to make several capitulations to the ligue. While in exile from the capital in Rouen he agreed to sign their proposed Edict of Union and pardon all the participants in the coup in the capital. By this act he would exclude the Protestant Navarre from the succession in favour of Navarre's Catholic uncle Cardinal Bourbon, and conduct a war against heresy, the details of which were to be worked out an Estates General. He further removed his hated favourite the duke of Épernon from the majority of his offices, and established the ligues leader, the duke of Guise as the lieutenant-general of the kingdom. With these climb downs made Paris was once again under his authority, and he departed Rouen on 21 July.

=== Ministerial revolution ===
By letters patent published on 29 May and 8 July, Henri issued the calls for the convoking of the Estates General. The Parisian ligue wanted Henri to return to the capital, however Henri made his excuses that he was needed at Blois the location of the upcoming Estates General. He arrived at Blois for the upcoming meeting on 1 September, accompanied by his mother and his various ministers. On 8 September he sacked almost all his ministers, and replaced them with largely unknown men. François II de Montholon was appointed garde des sceaux, giving him the authority of Chancellor, and Ruzé and Revol were established as new secretaries of state.

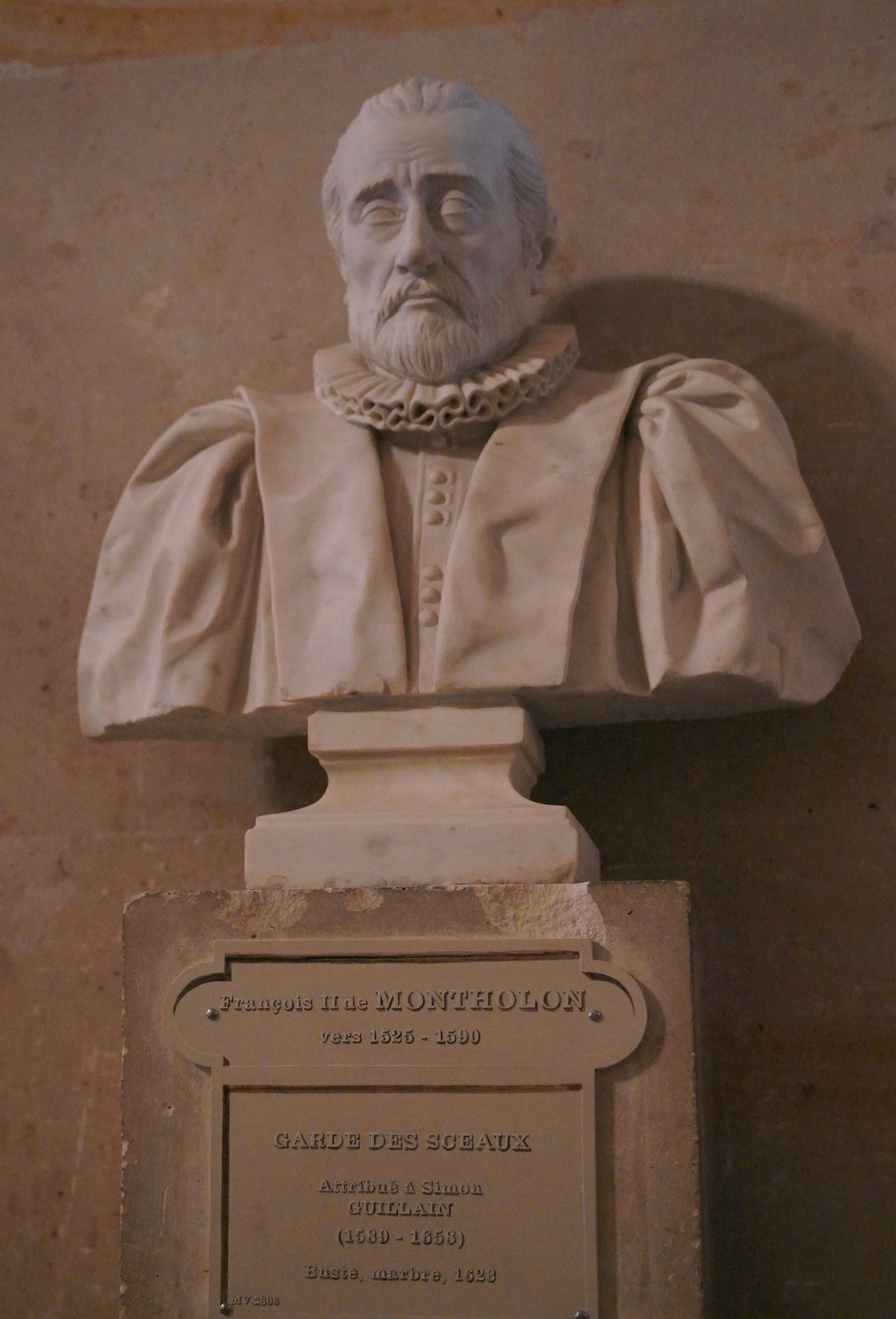
The new gardes des sceaux François II de Montholon

Explaining his reasoning for this palace revolution to his mother, Henri opined that Chancellor Cheverny was corrupt. As for his former ministers, 'Bellièvre (the surintendant des finances) was a crypto-Protestant, Villeroy was vain, Brûlart was a nonentity, and Pinart would sell his own parents for money'. He offered a different explanation to the Papal Legate Morosini, explaining how he suspected that the soon to be convened Estates would have demanded their sacking, and thus he was beating them to the punch. Morosini found the explanation plausible, envisioning that the men would be blamed for the high taxation, but also thought that their links to the king's mother Catherine de Medici had a part to play. The Venetian ambassador suspected the men had been leaking state secrets to Guise.

The new men were little known administrators, Montholon possibly never having seen the king before. The reshuffle came with a change in administration style, Henri now governing far more directly than he had, with his ministers not to open his letters privately as they had in previous years.

=== Ambitions ===
The ligue hoped that the upcoming Estates General would be used to further the plans for a war against heresy. Henri however had different ambitions for the gathering, and looked to use it to isolate the noble ligueurs from their urban base, thus regaining the initiative he had lost so decisively during the Day of the Barricades. He had further need of the Estates due to the ruinous state of royal finances, the crown's debts had increased from 101 million at the time of the Estates General of 1576, to 133 million. Between a quarter and third of royal expenditure was devoted to servicing debts. In his letter to the provinces, in which he made the call for the Estates, Henri promised that he would do all in his power to carry out their wishes.

Unable to attend the Estates, due to being at war with the crown and a Protestant, Navarre desired nevertheless to moderate the meeting away from any radical course against him. In August he warned that he was willing to defend his rights, and that the delegates for the Estates should work towards a productive peace, so that a general council could resolve doctrinal issues between Protestants and Catholics. He implied that if such a council were to occur, he would be open to abjuring. When the Estates convened, he was able to rely on his Catholic cousins Montpensier, Conti and Soissons to represent his position against the Catholic fundamentalists and they sought to temper the Estates attitude towards him.

=== Delegates ===
A bitter election of deputies to the Estates followed, with Henri and the ligue competing to get their candidates elected. The duke of Guise wrote to the Spanish ambassador Mendoza, explaining that 'I am not forgetting anything on my side, having sent to all provinces and bailliages [trustworthy agents] to secure a contrary outcome'. He further added that 'the largest number of deputies will be for us'.

With delegates chosen, they drew up their cahiers, lists of grievances they wished to be addressed, before heading to Blois. Though it had initially been intended for the Estates to begin their deliberations on 15 September, too few delegates had arrived by that time for things to be started, so the opening was pushed back a month.

== Elections in the provinces ==
=== Champagne ===
In the Guisard heartland of Champagne, the duke of Guise's brother, Cardinal Guise helped engineer suitably ligueur deputies, personally choosing Esclavolles as a deputy of the Second Estate for Troyes among others. Departing from the city for the Estates, he brought with him to Blois all the delegates from Troyes that he had chosen. Cardinal Guise was not however the First Estates delegate for Troyes, instead having secured selection through the baillage of Vermandois. Overall the ligue and its leaders had more success in securing ideologically loyal candidates among the First and Third Estates, while the Second reflected more the clientage networks of the provincial noblesse seconde. Much of the local Champenois nobility was either neutral concerning the ligue or allied with the lieutenant general Joachim de Dinteville in support of the crown's cause.

=== Normandie ===
The ligue saw further success in Normandie. The ligueur heir to the French throne, Cardinal Bourbon, received election for the First Estate in his power base of Rouen. the count of Brissac who had played a large role in organising the Day of the Barricades was elected for the Caux, and the Roncherolles who had been involved in the formation of the ligue in 1584 got a member of their family elected for Gisors. Even in the more royalist confines of Caen a ligueur captain was elected. Only in Alençon in Normandie did the ligue run into serious roadblocks, as the royalist bailli Jacques de Renty engaged in subterfuge to best his ligueur opponent Gabriel de Vieuxpoint. Men of the Guise network were elected in many places, as with the Second Estate of Rouen, which returned a client of theirs named Nicolas Vipart. The elections to the Third Estate in Normandie demonstrate more complexity in the factions that would be present at Blois. The royalist Third Estate deputy from Caen baulked at the demands for increased taxation, meanwhile the ligueur deputy from Rouen refused to countenance the idea of the king's financiers being prosecuted, and struck a line on taxation that almost saw him defenestrated by his fellow Third Estate deputies.

=== Lyon ===
In Lyon, Claude de Rubys drew up the cahiers for the estates delegates. The complaints he presented were largely nationalist in character, with the crimes of 'Italian financiers' holding central place. The cahiers argued these financiers accumulated offices and estates through the harsh taxation they imposed upon the people, and that to rectify this, the king should confiscate these holdings and suppress any offices created for the financiers. The cahiers called for trials of those who loaned to the crown at 100% interest, or made high profits off tax farming.

=== Paris ===
The cahiers of Paris for the Estates were far more elaborate in their ligueur character, due to the ligue domination of the city in the wake of May 1588. Demands were made for the suppression of hundreds of venal offices, arguing these offices were arbitrary and created to pay off debts to financiers. The cahiers called for the establishment of a special chamber to investigate financial crimes. The primary problem of the kingdom according to the grievance list, was of course the toleration of 'heresy', which the cahiers alleged was enabled by protective favourites at court who shielded 'heretics' from their 'rightful persecution' and subjugated the population of France with oppressive measures. The king's favourites, Épernon and his brother Bernard de Nogaret were denounced as heretical allies of Navarre. There were also proposals for the Estates to have power over the king's ministers, and for the Estates General to become a body that sat in permanent session. A 'council of state' was to be established, composed of twelve men, to instruct the king during absences of the Estates.

=== Guise network ===
The duke of Guise's brother, Mayenne took charge of ensuring Bourgogne and Poitou delivered suitably ligueur candidates. Guise's cousin Aumale arrived to guide the provincial delegates who had met in Amiens. The duke himself, travelled widely, ensuring his presence was felt at various elections.

=== Cahiers ===
The Third Estate in Chaumont took the radical step in their cahiers of suggesting that their loyalty to the king would be contingent on his upholding of the fundamental laws of the kingdom, and if he violated these principles, his subjects would no longer be compelled to obey him. Provocative requests that challenged the king's authority did not solely originate from the Third Estate. The nobles of the baillage of Montdidier argued that the provincial estates should be expanded in purview, to afford the local nobility a greater say in the affairs of their provinces. The nobility of the Boulonnais meanwhile urged the king to revoke the last 20 years of taxation and to put the kingdoms chief financiers on trial. Despite the radicalism of the cahiers of 1588, none were openly hostile to the king himself, even those of Paris thanked him attempting to relieve the oppression of the people.

=== Royal successes ===
While the ligue succeeded in dominating many provincial elections, Henri was also able to put his thumb on the scales. For the Second Estate election of Chartres, he overruled the governor of the city, insisting that his favourite, the seigner de Maintenon be chosen. When the governor protested, he threatened to kill the alternative proposed candidate if he showed up at Blois.

Henri would also secure the participation of royalist nobles from Poitiers, such as the count of Sanzay.

== Preparation for the Estates ==
The ligue was largely successful in their electoral efforts, and when the Estates finally met in October, the ligue dominated the Third Estate. Henri had however made more inroads into the nobility and clergy than had been anticipated. The king was in good spirits about his prospects for the Estates, confiding his optimism in his long time confident the duke of Nevers.

Overall however, his situation was still poor, which was a problem as his plan to divide and conquer the estates, as he had with the Estates General of 1576 would be frustrated by their general unity of purpose. The ligueur deputies for their part, well remembered the Estates General of 1576, and were determined not to be outmanoeuvred again.

=== Election of the Présidents ===
Cardinal Bourbon and Cardinal Guise were chosen as Présidents for the First Estate. They led a delegation of 134 deputies of whom bishops and archbishops constituted twenty five. Of these twenty five senior churchmen, seventeen were affiliated with the ligue while around nine were royalist. This leadership by Cardinals of the Estate was not atypical, indeed a Cardinal was expected to act as speaker for the Estates as a whole.

The ligueur duke of Brissac was elected Président for the Second Estate alongside the baron de Magnac. In total they would lead 180 noble deputies. Brissac had played a key role in organising the rebel forces during the Day of the Barricades, and was an ardent ligueur.

La Chapelle-Marteau was electedPrésident for the Third, at the head of 191 deputies. He had been made prévôt des marchands, the equivalent of mayor of Paris, by the ligueur coup government, known as the Seize, in the days after the Day of the Barricades. In total around 80% of the Third Estate deputies were ligueur in affiliation. Around half of the deputies were drawn from the judiciary, in particular avocats.

=== Guise's dilemma ===
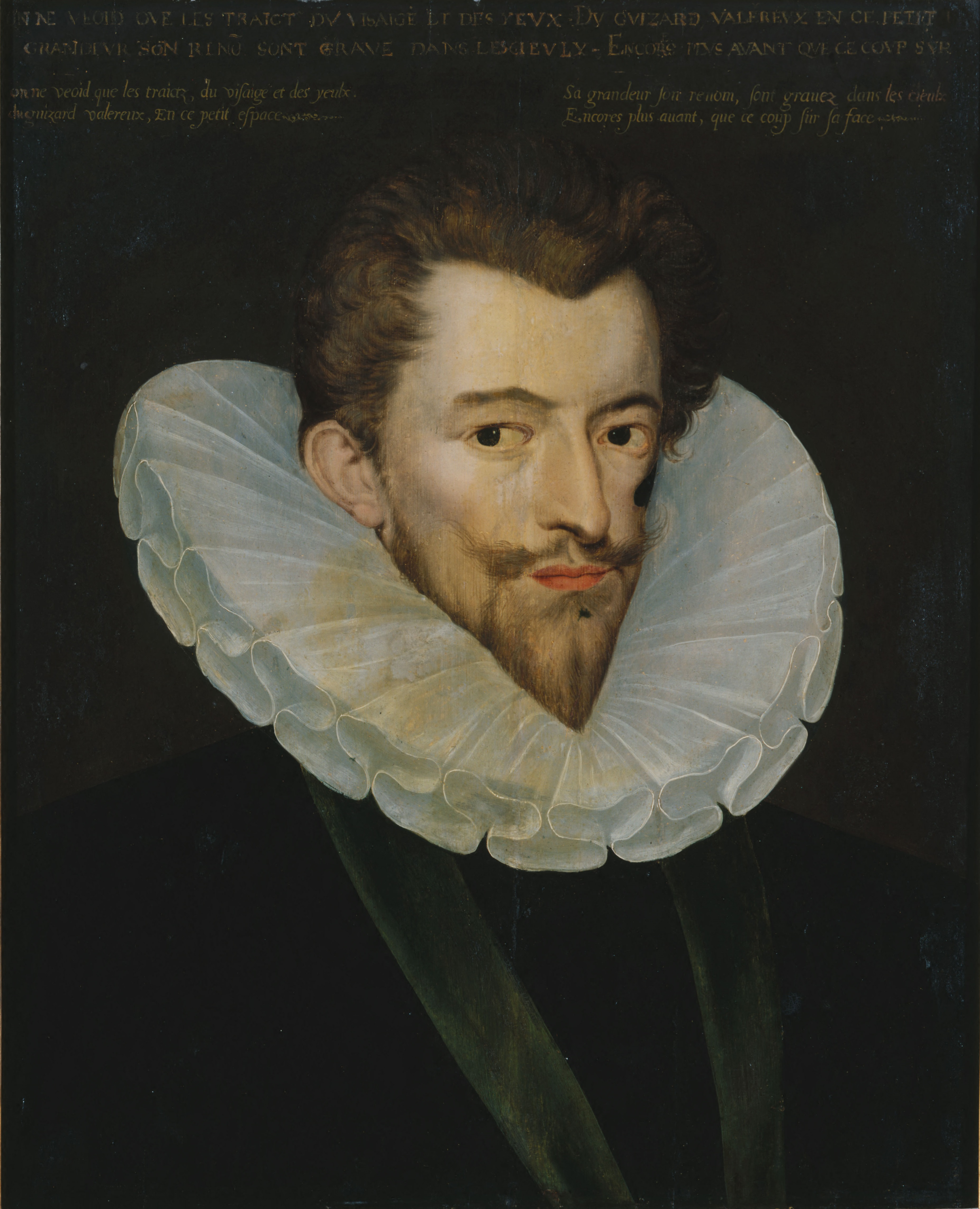
Portrait of the duke of Guise

The duke of Guise, who had in the wake of the Day of the Barricades been granted one of the two royal armies to command, handed over his control to the ligueur adjacent Nevers in September. He would join all the rest of the ligueur leadership at Blois with the exception of his brother Mayenne who stayed with his army command. Henri opined to his ally Cardinal Joyeuse that the upcoming Estates would reveal to him, whether Guise remained a servant of the crown, or an enemy.

On 9 October five representatives of each Estate attended high mass in front of the High Altar of Notre-Dame-des-Aides. A ceremonial moment before the sessions began, the king joined them, accompanied by the queen, his mother and the princes of the realm.

== Estates in session ==
=== 16 October opening ===
In his opening address to the Estates on 16 October, Henri opened with praise for his mothers stewardship of the kingdom calling her 'mother of the kingdom'. This praise of his mother was his parting tribute to her, as since the dismissal of his ministers in September, he had ceased to consult her on state affairs. He went on to reinforce his resolute Catholicism, and plans to make war on heresy. Henri further outlined his intentions to undertake an ambitions program of reform of the state. During his speech, Henri took a provocative step, declaring that 'Some great nobles in my kingdom have formed such leagues and associations, but with my customary kindness I am putting the past behind me regarding this matter. However, as I have to uphold royal dignity, I hereby declare that any subject of mine who now or in the future will continue to adhere to such leagues and associations without my consent, will be deemed guilty of high treason'. The duke of Guise, in his capacity as Grand Maître was seated directly below the king during this address, and was reported to turn pale when he heard this part of the speech. Meeting with his brother Cardinal Guise and their ally the Archbishop of Lyon after the session, Cardinal Guise chided him for having 'down things by half', i.e. not deposing Henri in May, while Épinac proposed pressuring the king to remove the passage. They agreed they would compel Henri to delete the passage from the printed version of his speech. Confronted by the Archbishop and Cardinal Guise, Henri capitulated to their demands and removed it.

Montholon followed the king's address with one of his own, in which he reinforced the king's desire to suppress heresy and reduce the amount of venal offices. He had intended to detail plans of ecclesiastical alienations to be made to raise funds, but the rebukes the court had received from the cahiers of the Estates led to this being excised.

=== 18 October - fundamental laws ===
In the second session of the Estates, the Estates began to push their religious program. The Edict of Union Henri had been compelled to assent to was declared by the delegates to be a 'fundamental law' of the kingdom. Henri capitulated to their demands that it be considered such, in so doing superseding the Salic Law which had previously governed royal succession. He at first attempted to temper what he was being asked to do, trying to insert the phrase 'the authority, fidelity and obedience due to his majesty', but the Estates rejected this, and he was forced to concede. Having made this capitulation Henri was escorted for a Te Deum at the Cathedral of Saint-Sauveur, where he was greeted by cheering crowds. La Chapelle-Marteau thanked him on behalf of Paris for the steps he had taken, causing Henri to respond that he forgave them for the Day of the Barricades.

Guise was delighted by the days affairs, writing to the Spanish ambassador in celebration. While many Catholics celebrated his capitulations, his supporters, such as the Parlementaire De Thou bemoaned the degradations and humiliations he was being forced into. Not all his supporters were so downcast however. The duke of Nevers, who was both a close confident of the king and adjacent politically to the ligue was overjoyed, describing the capitulation as holy.

=== First Estate priorities ===
The Estates were generally combative, with the First Estate pushing hard for the resumption of war against Protestants. Elements of the First Estate also campaigned for the return of episcopal elections, a former jealously guarded privilege which had been suppressed by Pope Clement VII in 1531. The 1539 Edict of Villers-Cotterêts was also subject to criticism, the edict having restricted the purview of ecclesiastical courts. The clergy further wanted the ability to use royal gendarmes for ecclesiastical affairs without the permission of a secular court. However these appeals failed to achieve success. The ligueur Prelates among the First Estate proved to have a relatively small role in their Estates campaigns, which were led by members of the lower clergy. On 4 November, the lower clergy drove the Estates as a whole to demand that Henri go further than the Edict of Union, and specifically declare that Navarre was a traitor, and had no rights to inherit the crown. Henri baulked at this, arguing that it was not right for Navarre to be judged without being able to defend himself, and he proposed an embassy be dispatched to remind Navarre of his duties. Opposition was raised to Henri's decision to pardon Conti and Soissons, who had previously campaigned with Navarre in 1587. Adoption of the Tridentine Decrees was also campaigned for by the First Estate, which was disappointed that the Parlement of Paris was currently rejecting them. Henri promised to look into the matter.

Among the prelates it was the royalists who proved more active. The most radical of the royalists Claude d'Angennes, bishop of Le Mans argued that while heresy must be deplored, the heretic himself must be loved so that they might be redeemed. He further supported the Protestant Navarre's succession and refused to affiliate with the ligueur Oath of Union. For his radical position he was censured by the First Estate and Sorbonne.

=== Third estate priorities ===
The Third Estate meanwhile, challenged Henri on a range of fronts arguing for an overhaul of the judiciary, reduction in taxation, abolition of venality, limits on the king's fiscal powers and most radically for the Estates to become a regular body. This last demand in particular, which pushed the kingdom in the direction of a constitutional monarchy, was not what the noble ligueurs of the First and Second Estate had in mind, and was embarrassing to them. Henri conceded to some of their fiscal demands, but the Third Estate pushed harder, alarming Henri with their expansive view of what the Estates should be. It was in particular the Parisian component of the Third Estate, coalesced around the Seize that desired the most radical program to result from the assembly.

The Estates campaigned for Henri to institute a commission of inquiry into the 'fiscal crimes of Italian financiers'. In the prior months ligueur pamphlets had made claims about a shadowy group of around 30 Italian financiers, who together controlled all of France's wealth. It was the men of this pamphlet who were at the forefront of the Estates campaign. On 23 November Lazare Coquelay delivered a fiery speech in which he urged the Estates to seek out the riches held by 'courtiers and other vermin' who were to be 'squeezed like sponges'. Henri at first appeared to assent to this demand, causing cheers of 'Vive le Roi!', before adding that he would do it in exchange for the provision of funds to support his household and prosecute the war.

Président Neuilly and La Chapelle-Marteau were tasked with conducting an audit of the royal accounts. Their investigations found a chaotic system filled with nepotism and secrecy. This was fairly typical of the royal way of doing business but it appeared to them to be a sign either of incompetence or fraud. The Third Estate left the audit with the impression Henri had the funds he needed, he was just using them improperly.

For a war against heresy, Henri required tax revenue be provided by the Estates, however the Third Estate was uninterested in conceding ground in this regard and proposed that Henri curb his expenditures to raise the necessary money.

=== Position of Guise ===
Having attained much of what he desired from the king during the capitulations that followed the Day of the Barricades. Guise had not been keen to see the Estates General convoked. He was keenly aware that his interests now diverged from those of his base. A fact the king was also aware of, and keen to exploit. Guise greatly desired a war against heresy, and in particular Navarre. To achieve this he was happy to see an increase in taxation to fund the war. The Third Estate however, upon which the burden of taxation would largely fall, wished to see both the war on heresy, and the reduction in taxation. Guise found himself involved in repeated negotiations with the Third Estate in an attempt to reconcile the two positions, something he would ultimately be unsuccessful in at the time of his death. He would be accompanied in these negotiations by the Papal Legate Morosini.

=== Marquisate of Saluzzo ===
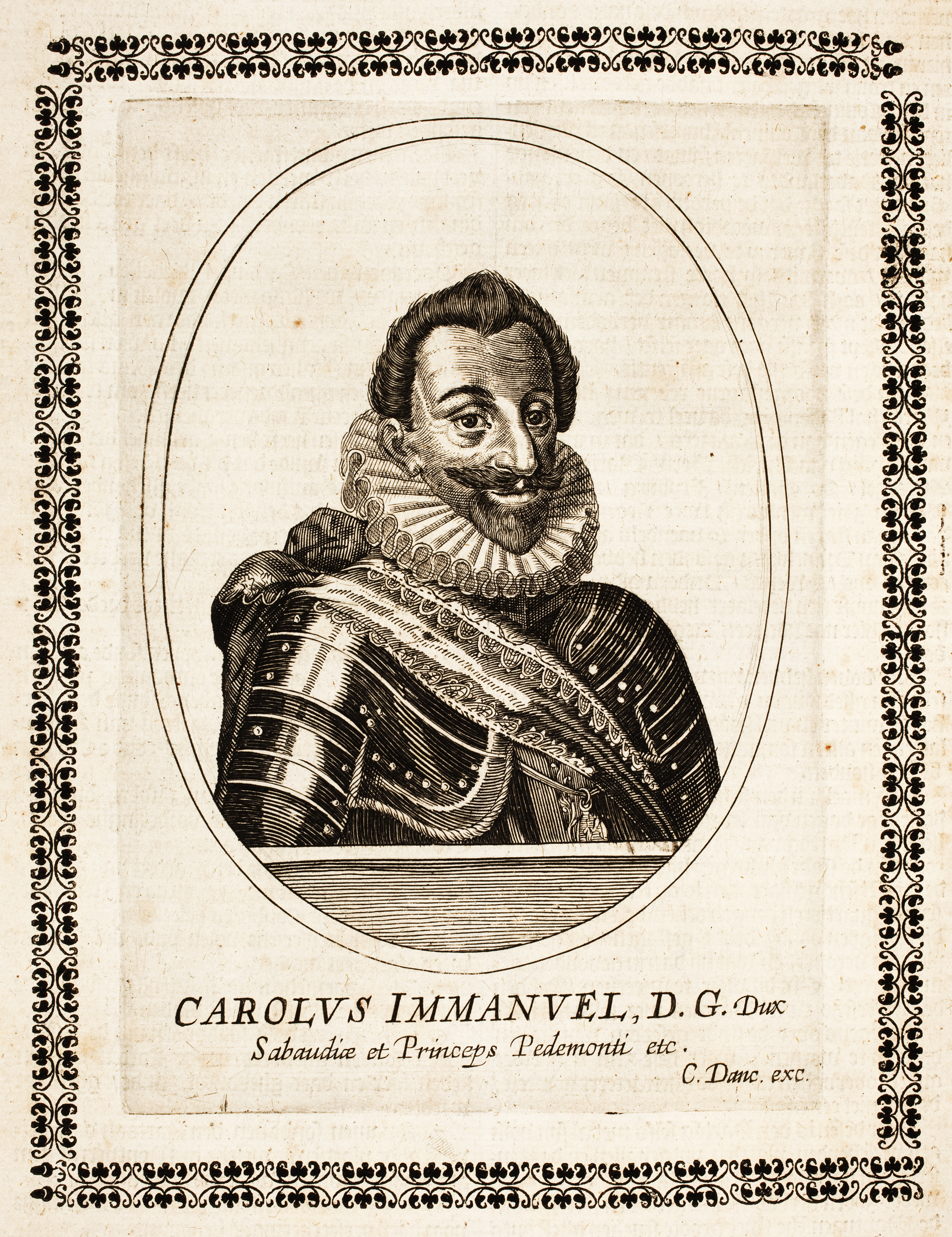
Engraving of the duke of Savoie, who invaded Saluzzo

At the end of October, while the Estates were in session, the duke of Savoie invaded the French Marquisate of Saluzzo, under the pretext of protecting the territory from heresy. This represented the final conquest in Italia from the Italian Wars that France still held. Maintenon, who Henri had forced into the Estates attempted to lead the Second Estate in calling for a campaign against the duke, but he was unsuccessful in bringing the Estates towards a patriotic war. This was despite initial success when he whipped the Second Estate into a patriotic fervour towards a 'glorious' war against the 'national enemy', i.e. España. The First and Third Estate soon got them back into line with their position. The estates took the position that any campaign against Savoie was predicated upon the prosecution of the most important war, that against heresy.

Guise though in theory open to a campaign against Savoie, supported the First and Third Estates position in this, working through the Spanish ambassador, as he feared a war against Savoie would denude the war against Protestantism. He was further aware of the potential risks to his relationship with España in such a move, the duke of Savoie and Felipe II being close relatives.

Henri could not believe the duke of Savoie would have invaded without the consent of the ligue, and saw Guise's efforts behind the invasion. He was incorrect, Guise had rebuffed the duke's offers.

=== Financial disputes ===
On 11 November Henri submitted his proposal for royal expenditure to the Estates for their attentions. His proposal was a radical curtailing of royal expenditure. Despite these efforts of appeasement the Third Estate was unimpressed, offering him only 120,000 livres. Of this sum, he was not even to see 100,000 which was to be delivered directly towards the two commanders of the royal army, the duke of Guise's brother the duke of Mayenne and the ligue sympathetic duke of Nevers. The duke of Guise for his part assured the king this sum could be raised within eight days.

At the end of November, Henri made further concessions to the Third Estate. Taxes would be reduced, a chamber of justice created and tax collection would be in the hands of the provinces. The Third Estate, chose instead of thanking him for the concessions to push for more negotiations. On 28 November Guise dined with La Chapelle-Marteau and other leaders to discuss the Third Estates position, pleading with them to afford the king some financial relief. La Chapelle-Marteau and his colleagues were unmoved by the urgings of their aristocratic patron. On 3 December the Third Estate offered Henri an ultimatum, either he reduce taxation to 1576 levels, or they would leave. Henri turned to Guise to convince them to be reasonable, however his continued negotiations were baring little fruit. Henri for his part had by December taken to summoning groups of deputies to him, so that he could attempt to appease their demands.

Guise was by now in daily negotiations with the Third Estate, and was warned by the royalist Beauvais-Nangis that the king was becoming suspicious of his dealings with them. Behind the radical demands of the Third Estate, Henri now saw the hand of the Guise pulling the strings to squeeze him. Guise for his part was now being advised by his supporters to leave Blois for the safety of Orléans, however he was convinced by the Archbishop of Lyon that leaving the Estates would be an admission of his defeat. Henri for his part, received warnings that the duke of Guise planned to abduct him to Paris, where he could be more easily controlled in the ligueur city.

It was becoming increasingly clear that the Estates were deadlocked, Montpensier wrote to Nevers that he had made the decision to retire from the Estates, on 22 December. He was unaware that the king had already made a decision to 'cut the gordian knot'.

== Royal coup ==
=== Assassination of the duke of Guise ===
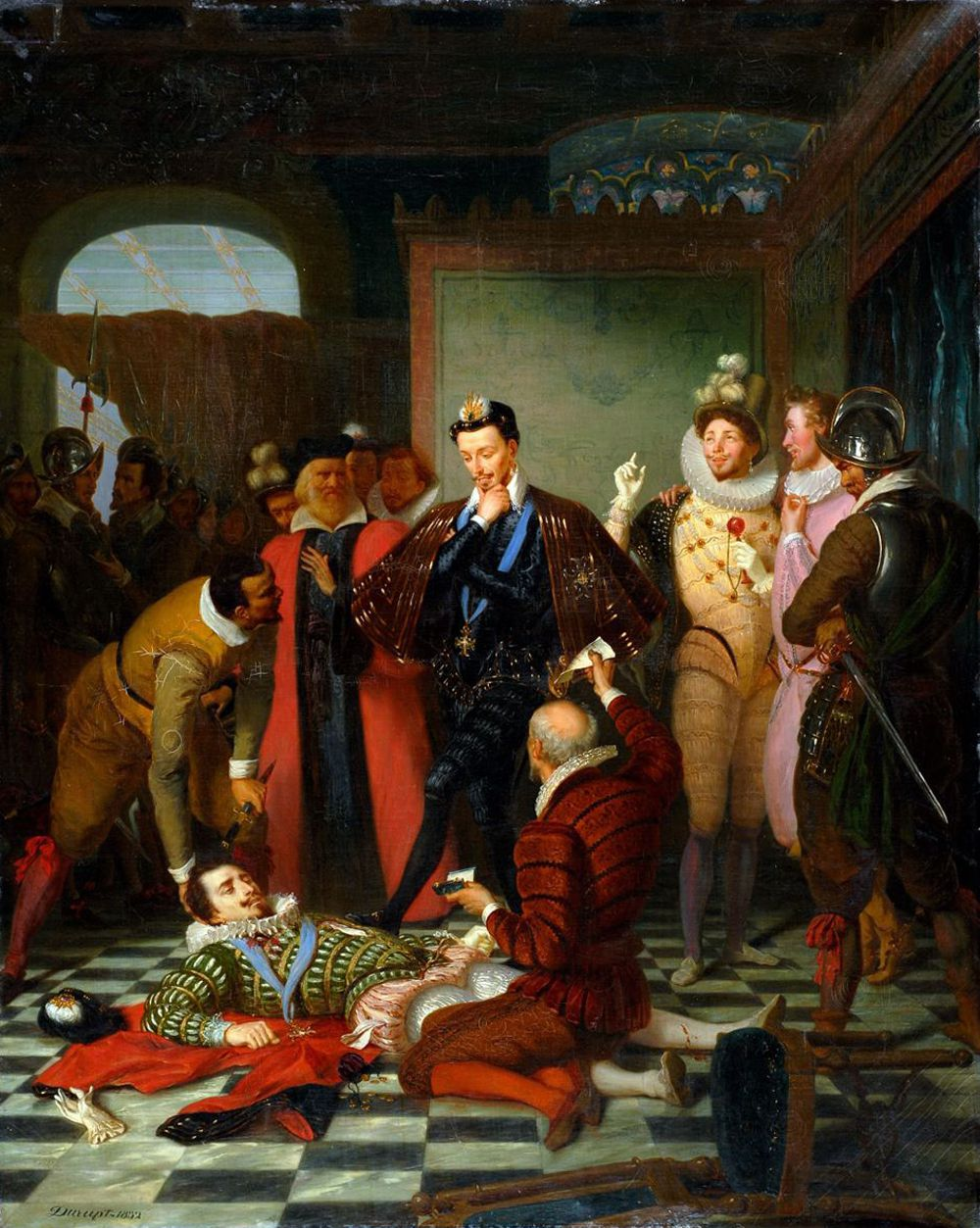
Assassination of Henri I, Duke of Guise, by Henri III, in 1588. Painting by Charles Durupt in the Château de Blois, where the attack took place.

Frustrated at the intransigence of the Estates among other grievances, Henri resolved to assassinate the Duke and Cardinal of Guise, hoping that by cutting off the head of the ligue he would tame the estates. On 23 December the duke was lured to the king's chambers and killed, the Cardinal, who had been arrested was killed the following day.

=== Ligueurs arrested ===
In the wake of the assassinations, Henri undertook a series of arrests of allies to the Guise. His grand prévôt Richelieu burst into the Estates chamber with a company of archers. Informed the assembled delegates that an attempt had been made on the king's life, he then moved to arrest various delegates. La Chapelle-Marteau, Louis Dorléans and Neuilly, all leaders of the Seize were rounded up. The Third Estate deputies were taken up to the bedchamber where the duke had been killed, and shown the pools of blood on the floor. They overheard that gallows were being constructed, however Henri had little interest in killing them, desiring only for them to be fearful enough that they would lose their defiance. The Seize shadow government of Paris was defiant, replacing their arrested members, and vowing to 'employ the last penny in their purse and the last drop of their blood' to avenge the murder of Guise. Cardinal Bourbon, the surviving leader of the First Estate and the heir Henri had been forced to recognise was put under house arrest. Brissac one of the leaders of the Second was likewise arrested.

=== Lingering defiance ===
Soon thereafter, Henri dispatched a delegation to the Estates, hoping that now Guise was dead, the Third Estate would be more malleable towards providing him with subsidies. Among the figures dispatched to intimidate the Estates was the duke of Retz and Cardinal Retz.

In early January, the Third Estate orator Étienne Bernard, a lawyer from Dijon, gave a defiant speech in which he critiqued the financial policies of the court, arguing that the people suffered not only due to the destruction brought by German reiters, but also that imposed upon them by financiers. He suggested the large monetary gifts given to the bankers and the methods they used to raise revenues had impoverished the common person. According to Bernard these men controlled legal tribunals through bribery and intimidation, and travelled through the kingdom protected by mercenaries from the common people as they implemented new fiscal devices.

While the Third Estate would not denounce Henri's actions against the Guise as illegal, enough defiance remained for them to argue for the release of their imprisoned colleagues.

=== End of the Estates ===
The Estates were indeed quieted from their most radical demands in the wake of the assassinations, and the Estates concluded in January 1589. The royalist bishop of Bourges gave the closing address of the Estates on 16 January, in which he urged that all Frenchman pray for Henri's health and longevity. That same day, the ligueur government of Paris purged the Paris Parlement of royalists.

== Aftermath ==
The assassination of the duke of Guise ultimately overshadowed the Estates, and radically changed the political situation in France. In Paris, Mayenne was declared lieutenant general of the kingdom by the Seize, and cities across France began to defect to the ligue. The Sorbonne pre-empted a declaration of Henri's excommunication by the Pope by declaring that all his subjects were absolved of their loyalty to him. Henri entered open civil war with the ligue.

His position was not however strong enough to fight the ligue on his own, and he turned to his former heir the Protestant Navarre for support. The two kings entered compact in April, and began a fight back against the ligue.

== Sources ==
- Babelon, Jean-Pierre (2009). Henri IV. Fayard.
- Baumgartner, Frederic (1986). Change and Continuity in the French Episcopate: The Bishops and the Wars of Religion 1547-1610.
- Benedict, Philip (2003). Rouen during the Wars of Religion. Cambridge University Press.
- Bernstein, Hilary (2004). Between Crown and Community: Politics and Civic Culture in Sixteenth-Century Poitiers. Cornell University Press.
- Carroll, Stuart (2005). Noble Power During the French Wars of Religion: The Guise Affinity and the Catholic Cause in Normandy. Cambridge University Press.
- Carroll, Stuart (2011). Martyrs and Murderers: The Guise Family and the Making of Europe. Oxford University Press.
- Chevallier, Pierre (1985). Henri III: Roi Shakespearien. Fayard.
- Cloulas, Ivan (1979). Catherine de Médicis. Fayard.
- Constant, Jean-Marie (1984). Les Guise. Hachette.
- Constant, Jean-Marie (1996). La Ligue. Fayard.
- Heller, Henry (2003). Anti-Italianism in Sixteenth Century France. University of Toronto Press.
- Holt, Mack P. (2005). The French Wars of Religion, 1562-1629. Cambridge University Press.
- Jouanna, Arlette (1998). Histoire et Dictionnaire des Guerres de Religion. Bouquins.
- Knecht, Robert (2010). The French Wars of Religion, 1559-1598. Routledge.
- Knecht, Robert (2014). Catherine de' Medici. Routledge.
- Knecht, Robert (2016). Hero or Tyrant? Henry III, King of France, 1574-1589. Routledge.
- Konnert, Mark (1997). Civic Agendas & Religious Passion: Châlon-sur-Marne during the French Wars of Religion 1560-1594. Sixteenth Century Journal Publishers Inc.
- Konnert, Mark (2006). Local Politics in the French Wars of Religion: The Towns of Champagne, the Duc de Guise and the Catholic League 1560-1595. Ashgate.
- Pitts, Vincent (2012). Henri IV of France: His Reign and Age. Johns Hopkins University Press.
- Roberts, Penny (1996). A City in Conflict: Troyes during the French Wars of Religion. Manchester University Press.
- Roelker, Nancy (1996). One King, One Faith: The Parlement of Paris and the Religious Reformation of the Sixteenth Century. University of California Press.
- Le Roux, Nicolas (2000). La Faveur du Roi: Mignons et Courtisans au Temps des Derniers Valois. Champ Vallon.
- Le Roux, Nicolas (2006). Un Régicide au nom de Dieu: L'Assassinat d'Henri III. Gallimard.
- Salmon, J.H.M (1979). Society in Crisis: France during the Sixteenth Century. Metheun & Co.
- Sutherland, Nicola (1962). The French Secretaries of State in the Age of Catherine de Medici. The Athlone Press.
- Sutherland, Nicola (1980). The Huguenot Struggle for Recognition. Yale University Press.
