= Alphonse-Louis du Plessis de Richelieu =

French Carthusian bishop and cardinal

His Eminence Alphonse-Louis du Plessis de Richelieu O. Cart.
- Cardinal, Archbishop of Lyon; Primate of the Gauls
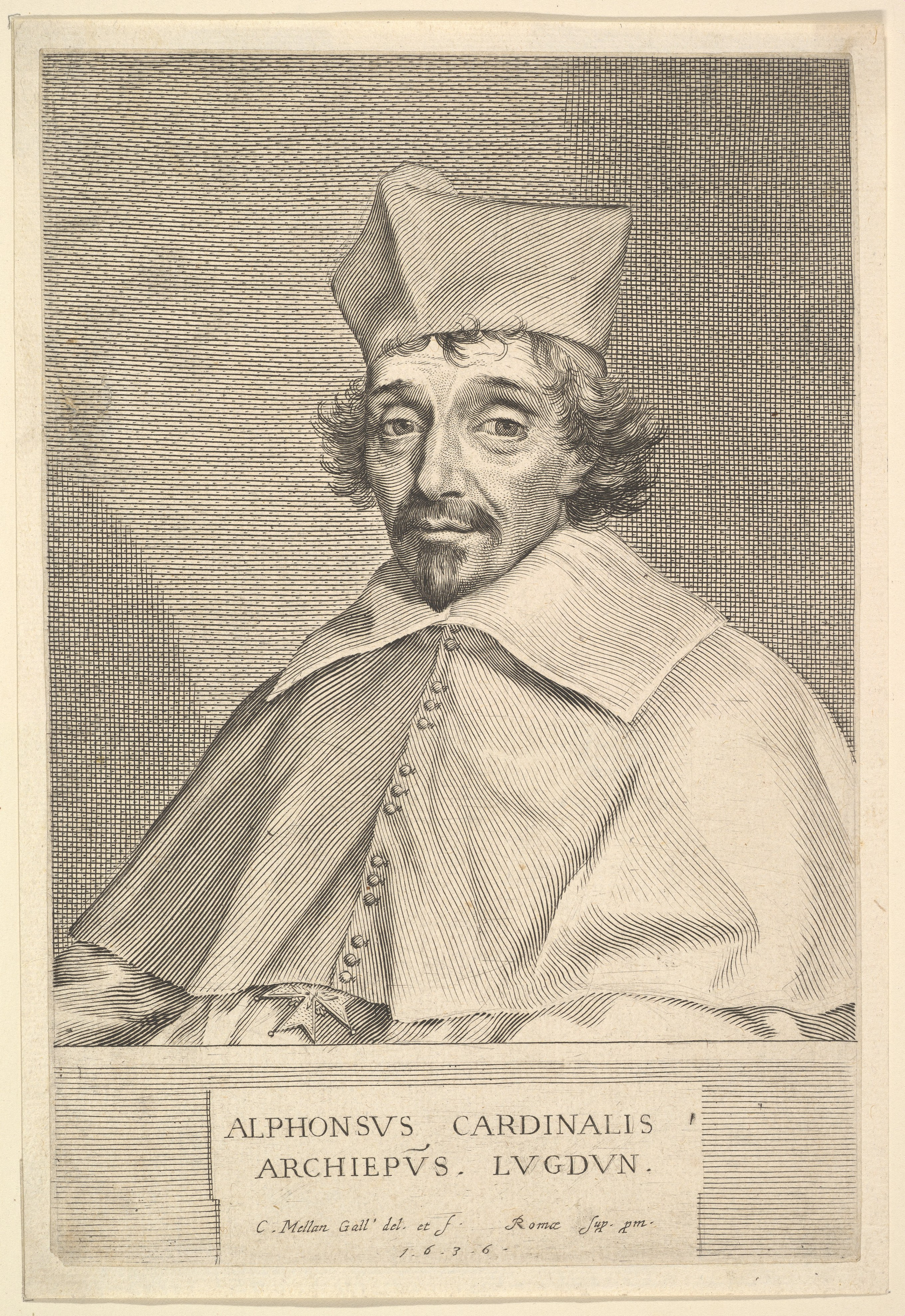
- Church: Roman Catholic
- Archdiocese: Lyon
- In office: 1628–1653
- Predecessor: Charles Miron
- Successor: Camille de Neufville de Villeroy
- Other post: Cardinal-Priest of Ss. Trinità al Monte Picino (1635–53)
- Previous posts: Archbishop of Aix (1626–28)

Orders
- Consecration: 21 June 1626 by Guillaume d'Hugues
- Created cardinal: 19 November 1629 by Urban VIII
- Rank: Cardinal-Priest

Personal details
- Born: 1582 Paris, Kingdom of France
- Died: 23 March 1653 (aged 70–71) Lyon, France
- Buried: Lyon Cathedral
- Parents: François du Plessis; Suzanne de La Porte
- Education: College of Navarre
- Coat of arms

Alphonse-Louis du Plessis de Richelieu (French pronunciation: [alfɔ̃s lwi dy plɛsi də ʁiʃ(ə)ljø]; 1582 – 23 March 1653) was a French Carthusian, bishop and Cardinal. He was the elder brother of Armand Cardinal Richelieu, the celebrated minister of Louis XIII.

== Life ==
He was born in Paris and was educated at the Collège de Navarre. He refused the position of Bishop of Luçon, practically in the gift of his family. He entered the Carthusian Order in 1602 and made his profession in 1605. He became prior of Bonpas, Caumont-sur-Durance. His harsh censorship drove Renė Descartes out of France.

His episcopate was arranged by his brother, and he was named Archbishop of Aix in 1626 and then Archbishop of Lyon in 1628. He was created cardinal in 1629. He was named Grand Almoner of France in 1631 and presided over the funeral of King Louis XIII in June 1644. He participated in the 1644 papal conclave which elected Pope Innocent X.

He died on 23 March 1653 in Lyon.

== Bibliography ==
- Albanès, Joseph Hyacinthe; Louis fillet (1899). Gallia christiana novissima (in French and Latin). Montbeliard: Valentinoise. pp. 136–138, 242–243.
- Charléty, S. (1902). "Lyon sous le ministère de Richelieu". Revue d'histoire moderne et contemporaine (1899–1914), Vol. 3, No. 2 (1901/1902), pp. 121–136; Vol. 3, No. 5 (1901/1902), pp. 493–507. (in French)
- Deloche, Maximin (1935). Un frère de Richelieu inconnu. Paris: Desclée. (in French)
- Fisquet, Honore (1864). La France pontificale: Lyon (in French). Paris: Etienne Repos. pp. 457–463.
- Péricaud, Marc-Antoine (1829). Notice historique sur Alphonse-Louis du Plessis de Richelieu, archevêque de Lyon sous Louis XIII et Louis XIV, suivie d'une Relation de la peste de Lyon en 1638 et 1639. Lyon: Barret, 1829.
- Puré, Michel de (1653). Vita Alphonsi-Ludovici Plessaei Richelii... Cardinalis... Archiepiscopi et comitis Lugdunensis (in Latin). Paris: Antonius Vitré.
