= La Noue =

Noue
- Commune
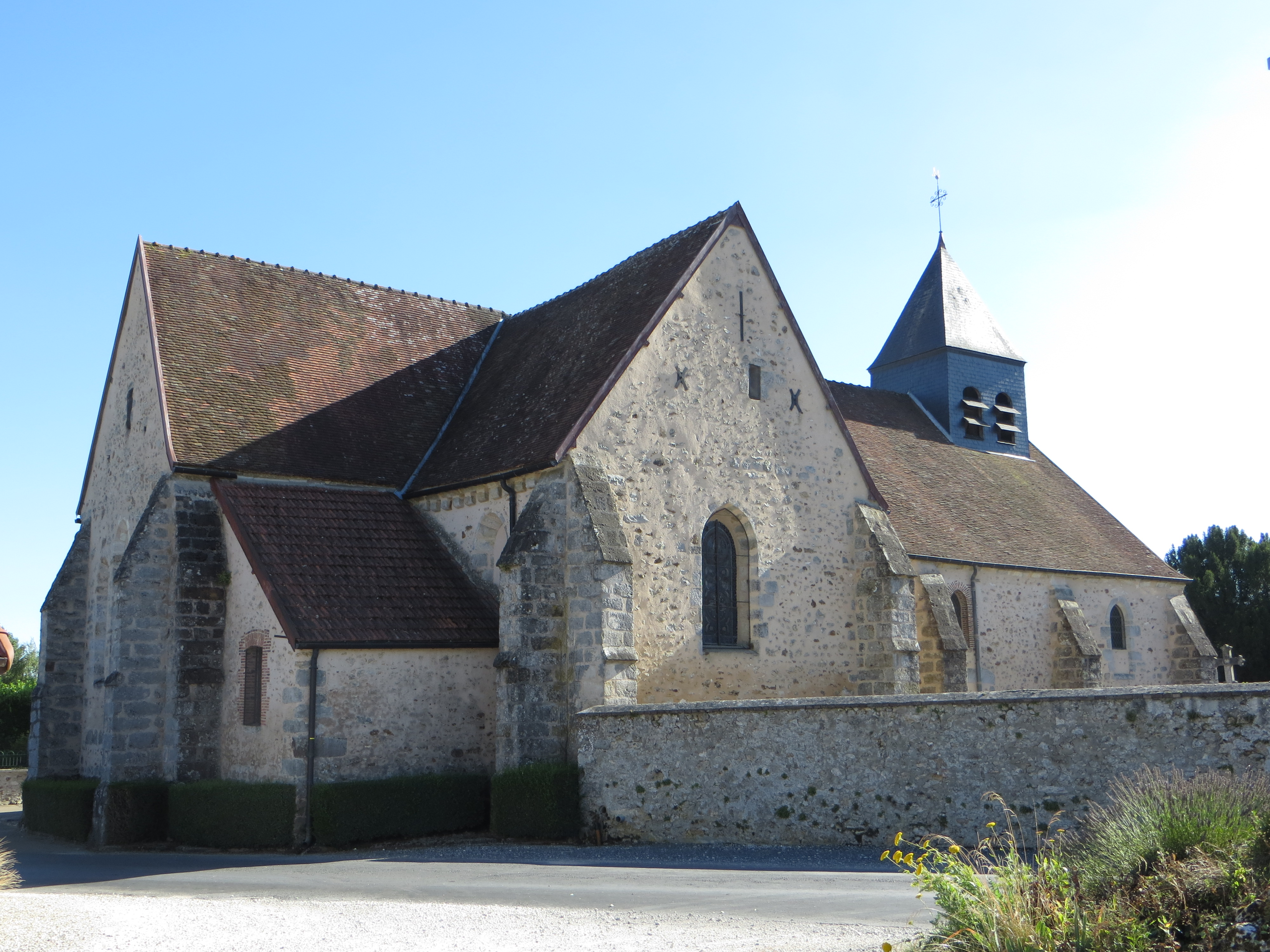
- The church in La Noue
- Location of Noue
- Location within France Location within Grand Est
- Coordinates: 48°44′38″N 3°36′41″E
- Country: France
- Region: Grand Est
- Department: Marne
- Arrondissement: Épernay
- Canton: Sézanne-Brie et Champagne
- Intercommunality: Sézanne-Sud Ouest Marnais

Government
  - Mayor (2020–2026): Bernard Queudret
- Area^{1}: 13.34 km^{2} (5.15 sq mi)
- Elevation: 185 m (607 ft)
- Population (2023): 371
  - Density: 27.8/km^{2} (72.0/sq mi)
- Time zone: UTC+01:00 (CET)
  - Summer (DST): UTC+02:00 (CEST)
- INSEE/Postal code: 51407 /51310
- ^{1} French Land Register data, which excludes lakes, ponds, glaciers > 1 km^{2} (0.386 sq mi or 247 acres) and river estuaries.

La Noue (French pronunciation: [la nu]) is a commune in the Marne department in the Grand Est region in north-eastern France.

== Notable people ==
- François Levaillant (1753–1824), explorer, ornithologist

== See also ==
- Communes of the Marne department
