= Louis Dorléans =

French poet and political pamphleteer

Louis Dorléans (1542–1629) was a French poet and political pamphleteer.

== Biography ==
Born in Paris in 1542, he studied under Jean Daurat. After taking his degree in law began to practise at the bar with but slight success. He wrote indifferent verses, but was a redoubtable pamphleteer. After the League arrested the royalist members of parliament, he was appointed advocate-general in 1589. His “Avertissement des catholiques anglais aux Français catholiques du danger où ils sont de perdre la religion et d’expérimenter, comme en Angleterre, la cruauté des ministres s’ils reçoivent à la couronne un roi qui soit hérétique” went through several editions, and was translated into English. One of his pamphlets, Le Banquet ou après-dînée du comte d’Arète, in which he accused Henry of insincerity in his return to the Roman Catholic faith, was so scurrilous as to be disapproved of by many members of the League. When Henry at length entered Paris, Dorléans was among the number of the proscribed. He took refuge in Antwerp, where he remained for nine years. At the expiration of that period he received a pardon, and returned to Paris, but was soon imprisoned for sedition. The king released him after three months in the Conciergerie, and by this means attached him permanently to his cause. His last years were passed in obscurity, and he died in 1629.
