= Day of the Barricades =

Public uprising during the French Wars of Religion

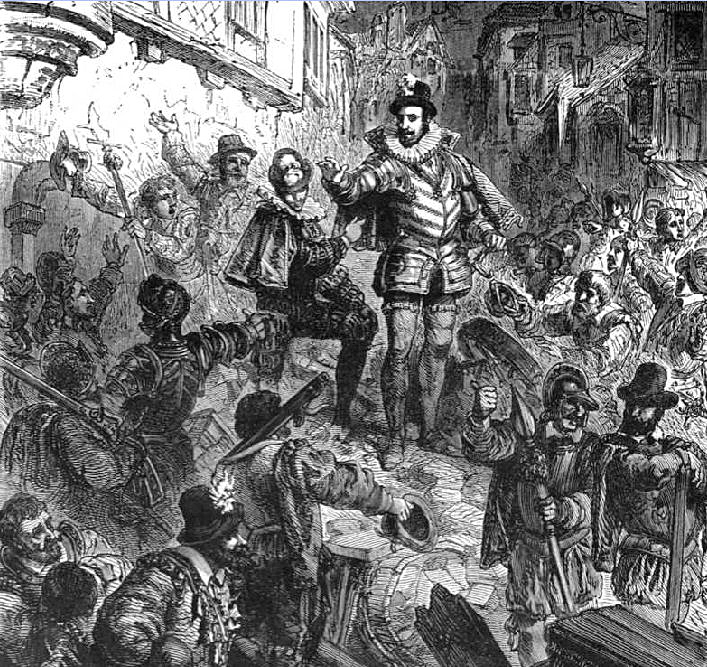
The Henry I, Duke of Guise during the Day of the Barricades, by Paul Lehugeur, 19th century

In the French Wars of Religion, the Day of the Barricades (in French: Journée des barricades), 12 May 1588, was an outwardly spontaneous public uprising in staunchly Catholic Paris against the moderate, hesitant, temporising policies of Henry III. It was in fact called forth by the "Council of Sixteen" (Conseil des Seize), representing the sixteen quartiers of Paris, led by Henry I, Duke of Guise, head of the Catholic League, and coordinated in detail by Philip II of Spain's ambassador, Bernardino de Mendoza.

== Background ==
Despite a royal interdict, the duc de Guise had returned to Paris in the wake of a betrayed conspiracy that had been set for 24 April, for he could not afford to be seen to desert his followers. In response the king, housed in the Palais du Louvre, mustered in the capital several regiments of Swiss Guards and the Gardes Françaises, an act that violated a privilege of the city of Paris, not to have foreign troops quartered in the city. Rumors were spread that the heads of the Catholic party of the House of Guise were to be arrested. The king ordered a census to be taken of Paris, a move that would flush out any "strangers", or non-Parisians, in the city, including forces of the duc de Guise, for the census ordered for 12 May was to be a very exact search of houses, with lists of people, arms and horses.

== Barricades ==
The barricades of wagons, timbers and hogsheads (barriques) (Note: They were chained together with chains that appeared suddenly at each point.) blocked access at major points in the city, beginning early in the day in the university quarter, where a certain Crucé, leader of the Seize, coordinated efforts. The barricades so hastily erected in the streets from materials at hand were the first appearance of that staple of French revolutions. (Note: A second Journée des barricades occurred during the Fronde, 1648. Barricades in the streets of Paris were a feature of the French Revolution and of every revolutionary moment of tension since. The construction of the city's wide boulevards during the Haussmann renovation was driven, in part, by a desire to make it harder to barricade the city's streets.) The militia formed the backbone of the revolt; the royal troops were immobilised in the various quartiers. The duc de Guise accepted an urgent message from the King to permit the orderly withdrawal of the foreign troops: "by consenting to rescue the royal forces, at the same time as claiming to save the city, he was able to project an image of his innocence and virtue, while actually delivering a fatal blow to the king's authority."

== Royal forces ==
The royal forces withdrew to the Louvre, as all the gates of Paris were closed save the Porte Saint-Honoré. The following day, 13 May 1588, the king was prevented from going to the Sainte-Chapelle, but the Porte Neuve, between the Louvre and the Tuileries, was left unguarded. An urgent message from the hôtel de Guise, whether betraying the unclear purposes of Guise or following his interest in not being seen to harm the king, convinced Henri to flee to Chartres. By day's end, some sixty soldiers had been killed in sporadic violence, the Bastille had capitulated and the duc de Guise was in undisputed possession of Paris, where he was offered the crown but refused it.

== Timing ==
The timing of the tumult was not as well coordinated with the sailing of the Spanish Armada against England (Note: The Armada set sail from Lisbon 28 May.) as the Spanish ambassador, Mendoza, had planned, but it still effectively distracted any Huguenot interference. The staunchly Catholic populace of Paris harbored genuine animosity towards King Henri III for several reasons. First, his unacceptable mignons and his fashionable court were perceived as effete and disengaged. Second, they were seen as all too ready to come to terms with the Protestants and the heir presumptive to the French throne, Henri of Navarre, who had not yet been formally designated heir to the childless Henri III. Finally, the Parisians were alarmed due to the troops posted in the city. Thus, the emotions were easy to exploit.

From his strong position, Guise forced the King to sign at Rouen the Édit d'union, registered at Paris on 21 July. By its terms the King promised never to conclude a truce or peace with the "hérétiques", to forbid public office to any who would not take a public oath of their Catholicité and never to leave the throne to a prince who was not Catholic; secret clauses extended amnesty to all deeds of the Catholic League, accorded support to its troops and made over to the League additional fortified places de sécurité. Two weeks later the duc de Guise was named lieutenant général of the kingdom. However, on 23 December of that year, the duc de Guise was assassinated in Château de Blois by the bodyguards of the king; de Guise's brother, Louis II de Lorraine, was assassinated the following day.

Pierre Matthieu recalled the events of the Journée des barricades in his La Guisiade (1589).
