= The Forty-Five Guardsmen =

1848 novel by Alexandre Dumas

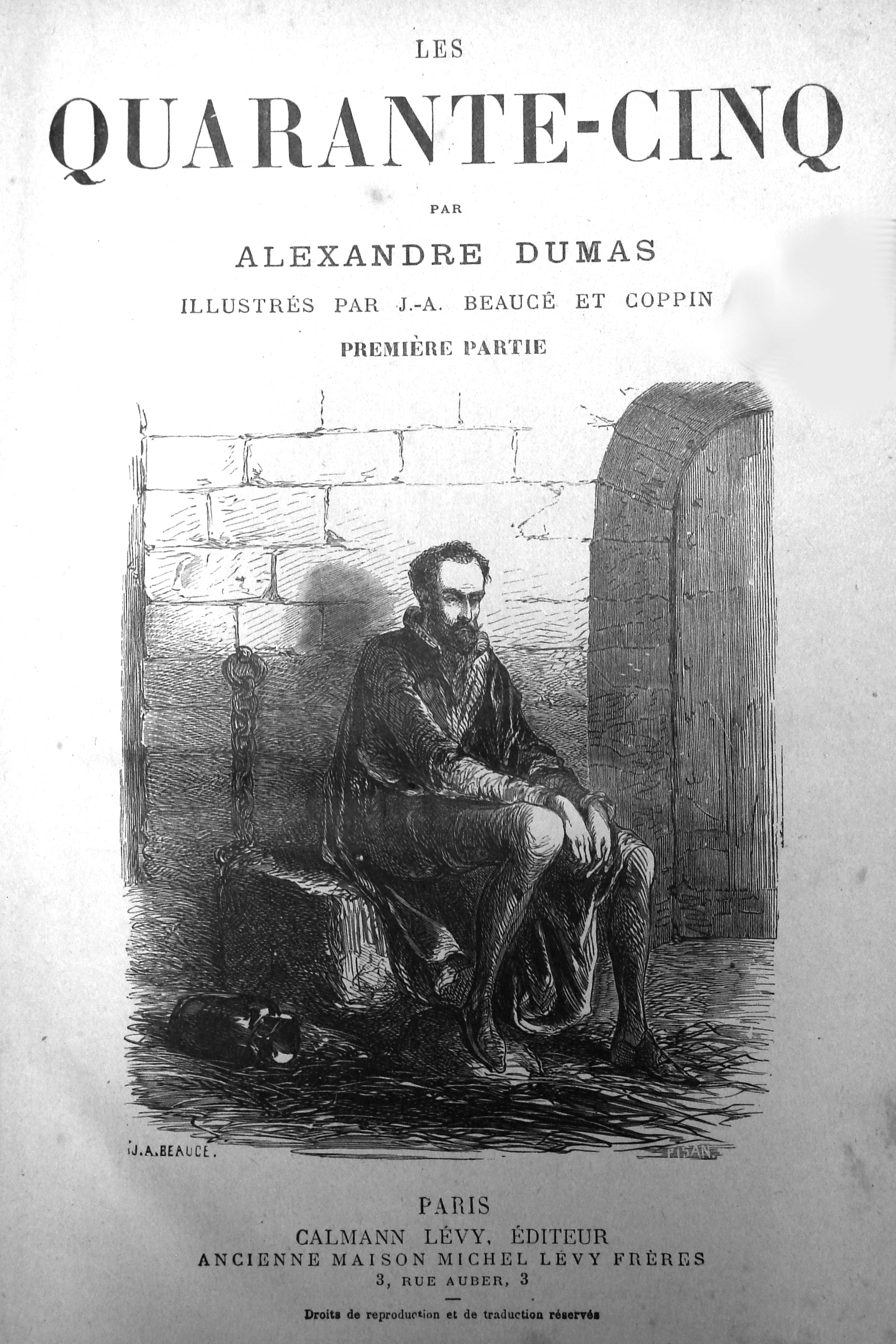
- Author: Alexandre Dumas in collaboration with Auguste Maquet
- Original title: Les Quarante-cinq
- Language: French
- Genre: Historical novel
- Publication date: 1848
- Publication place: France
- Preceded by: La Dame de Monsoreau

The Forty-Five Guardsmen (Les Quarante-cinq in French) is a historical novel by French writer Alexandre Dumas, written between 1847 and 1848 in collaboration with Auguste Maquet. Set in 1585 and 1586 during the French Wars of Religion, it is the third and final work in his Valois trilogy, concluding the events of La Reine Margot and La Dame de Monsoreau, and again featuring Chicot the Jester.

It tells the story of Diane de Méridor's quest for revenge upon the Duke of Anjou – for his betrayal of Bussy d’Amboise. The novel features Forty-five guards - lesser nobility recruited by Jean Louis de Nogaret de La Valette, Duke of Épernon, to provide Henry III of France with trusted protection in the midst of the War of the Three Henrys.

The story opens thirteen years after the Saint Bartholomew's Day Massacre and ten years into the reign of Henry III as he tries to calm the religious and political intrigues dividing the kingdom. Dumas fictionalised the action, including Henry of Navarre's capture of Cahors (which actually occurred in 1580) and the attack on Antwerp (re-dated by Dumas from 1583 to 1585 or 1586) and including William the Silent (who had actually been assassinated in 1584) and the Duke of Anjou (who died of tuberculosis in 1584 but who Dumas shows being encouraged to covet the crown of the Low Countries by William and fulfilling a prediction by Côme Ruggieri in La Reine Margot). He also makes Count Henri du Bouchage's retreat from the world to become a Capuchin friar a result of the coldness of Diane de Méridor, whereas historically he did so from grief for his wife's death.

== See also ==
- Chicot - the jester of Henry III and later Henry IV
