= La Reine Margot (1954 film) =

1954 film

- Directed by: Jean Dréville
- Screenplay by: Abel Gance
- Based on: La Reine Margot by Alexandre Dumas
- Produced by: Pierre Gurgo-Salice; Adolphe Osso; Claude Pessis
- Starring: Jeanne Moreau; Armando Francioli; Françoise Rosay
- Cinematography: Henri Alekan; Roger Hubert
- Edited by: Gabriel Rongier
- Music by: Paul Misraki
- Production companies: Lux Compagnie Cinématographique de France; Films Vendôme; Lux Film
- Distributed by: Lux Film
- Release date: 25 November 1954
- Running time: 93 minutes
- Countries: France; Italy
- Language: French

La Reine Margot (French: [la ʁɛn maʁɡo], English: Queen Margot) is a 1954 French–Italian adventure historical drama film directed by Jean Dréville, scripted by Abel Gance from the 1845 novel La Reine Margot by Alexandre Dumas. It stars Jeanne Moreau, Armando Francioli and Françoise Rosay. The film is also known under the alternative title A Woman of Evil.

It was made as a co-production between the French and Italian branches of Lux Film. It was made at the Epinay Studios in Paris. The film's sets were designed by the art director Maurice Colasson. It was shot in Eastmancolor.

== Cast ==
- Jeanne Moreau as Margaret of Valois
- Armando Francioli as Joseph Boniface de La Môle
- Henri Génès as Hannibal de Coconas
- Robert Porte as Charles IX
- André Versini as Henri de Navarre
- Françoise Rosay as Catherine de' Medici
- Vittorio Sanipoli as Maurevel
- Fiorella Mari as Henriette de Nevers
- Patrizia Lari as Charlotte de Sauve
- Daniel Ceccaldi as Henri d'Anjou
- Louis de Funès (uncredited) as René Bianchi
- Jacques Eyser as Caboche
- Guy Kerner as duc Henri de Guise
- Louis Arbessier as Admiral Gaspard de Coligny
- Nicole Riche as Gilonne
- Jean Temerson as aubergiste de La Belle Étoile
- Robert Moor as procureur
- Olivier Mathot as Pierre

== See also ==
- La Reine Margot (1994 film)

== Bibliography ==
- Klossner, Michael (2002). The Europe of 1500-1815 on Film and Television: A Worldwide Filmography of Over 2550 Works, 1895 Through 2000. McFarland & Company. ISBN 978-0-7864-1223-5.
