= Queen Margot (TV series) =

- Russian: Королева Марго
- Genre: historical drama
- Based on: La Reine Margot
- Screenplay by: Marina Mareeva
- Directed by: Alexander Muratov
- Starring: Yevgenia Dobrovolskaya; Dmitry Pevtsov; Mikhail Yefremov; Yekaterina Vasilyeva; Dmitry Kharatyan
- Composer: Eugen Doga
- Country of origin: Russia
- Original language: Russian
- No. of seasons: 1
- No. of episodes: 18

Production
- Producers: Sergey Zhigunov. Elena Samagina
- Cinematography: Oleg Martynov
- Editors: Eleonora Praksina; Valery Todorovsky; Natalya Kucherenko
- Running time: 566 min.

Original release
- Network: Russia 1
- Release: September 1996

Related
- Countess de Monsoreau

Queen Margot (Russian: Королева Марго, romanized: Koroleva Margo) is a Russian television series directed by Alexander Muratov. A film adaptation of the novel by Alexandre Dumas, filmed in 1994–1995, it premiered on television in the fall of 1996 on Russia 1.

== Plot ==
In order to cement another ephemeral peace between Catholics and Protestant Huguenots of France, on August 18, 1572, King Charles IX's sister Margaret was married to one of the Huguenot leaders, Henry de Bourbon, King of Navarre, her second cousin, the Prince of the Blood.

Her wedding, celebrated in Paris with great pomp, ended on St. Bartholomew's Day massacre. During a massacre, Margot accidentally saves a wounded Protestant nobleman and falls in love with him.

== Episodes ==
1. Book of Fates
2. St. Bartholomew's Day
3. Bloody Mass
4. Woe to the Vanquished
5. Heavenly Love, Earthly Love
6. Duel
7. Hangman's Handshake
8. Cherry Velvet Cloak
9. Royal Hounds
10. Unroyal Happiness
11. Sons of the She-Wolf
12. Rope-ladder
13. Lucky La Mole
14. Friday the Thirteenth
15. Honor of the House of Valois
16. Vincennes Castle
17. Spanish Boots
18. Ashes

== Cast ==
- Yevgenia Dobrovolskaya as Margaret of Valois, Queen Margot (voiced by Natalya Kaznacheeva)
- Dmitry Pevtsov as Henry of Navarre
- Mikhail Yefremov as Charles IX (voiced by Vladimir Yeryomin)
- Yekaterina Vasilyeva as Catherine de' Medici
- Dmitry Kharatyan as Joseph Boniface de La Môle (voiced by Aleksey Ivashchenko)
- Sergey Zhigunov as Annibal de Coconnas
- Sergei Yursky as Master Rene, astrologer
- Boris Klyuyev as Henry I, Duke of Guise
- Nikolai Karachentsov as De Mooi
- Mikhail Boyarsky as Morvel
- Vera Sotnikova as Henriette of Cleves (voiced by Anna Kamenkova)
- Armen Dzhigarkhanyan as Kabosh, executioner
- Yevgeniya Glushenko as Madelon, nurse of Charles IX
- Vladimir Ilyin as La Hurière
- Olga Drozdova as Charlotte de Sauve
- Vsevolod Larionov as Gaspard II de Coligny
- Olga Kabo as Marie Touchet
- Boris Shcherbakov as Bam
- Aleksey Buldakov as judge
- Igor Yasulovich as Prosecutor Lyagel
- Alexey Sheynin as Commandant Baron de Nance
- Boris Romanov as Ambroise Paré
- Maria Vinogradova as Kabosh's wife
- Aleksandr Domogarov as Louis de Clermont, seigneur de Bussy
- Yevgeny Dvorzhetsky as Henry III of France
- Vladimir Yeryomin as Monsieur de Pigny

== Film crew ==
- Director: Alexander Muratov
- Producers: Sergey Zhigunov, Elena Samagina
- Screenwriter: Marina Mareeva
- Cinematographers: Oleg Martynov, Pavel Nebera
- Composer: Eugen Doga
- Designer: Viktor Yushin
- Costume Designer: Natalia Polye
- Montage: Eleanor Praksina, Valery Todorovsky, Natalia Kucherenko
- Director of Horse Tricks: Igor Novoselov
