= Forty-five guards =

The forty-five guards (French: les quarante-cinq) were recruited by Jean Louis de Nogaret de La Valette, Duke of Épernon to provide Henry III of France with trusted protection in the midst of the War of the Three Henrys.

The 45 were noblemen of lesser nobility (many from Gascony) with little more than a horse, a sword, and a few acres to live on. In the king's service, they were paid a lavish wage (by their standards). In return, 15 of them were to be on duty, day or night, ready at the king's call.

After the Catholic League revolt in Paris, King Henry III was forced to flee to Blois, there, he staged a coup, regaining control of the Estates-General by employing the forty-five to kill Henry I, Duke of Guise when he came to meet the king at the Château de Blois on 23 December 1588, and his brother, Louis II, Cardinal of Guise, the following day.

After the king was assassinated by Jacques Clément, the crown of France passed to Henry IV of Navarre; the forty-five also passed to him and served him faithfully until his death, which was also by assassination – ironically in a conspiracy in which Épernon may have been involved.

The exploits of Henry III and the forty-five are the subject of The Forty-Five Guardsmen by Alexandre Dumas.

== See also ==
- The Forty-Five Guardsmen a novel by Alexandre Dumas
