= Zhang Yinglun =

Chinese translator (born 1938)

- Born: 1938 (age 87–88); Bengbu, Anhui, China
- Education: Peking University
- Occupation: Translator
- Writing career
- Language: Chinese, French
- Genre: Novel
- Notable works: Selection of Maupassant's Short Stories; La Reine Margot; Biography of Jing Yinyu

Chinese name
- Traditional Chinese: 張英倫
- Simplified Chinese: 张英伦
Transcriptions
Standard Mandarin
- Hanyu Pinyin: Zhāng Yīnglún

Zhang Yinglun (Chinese: 张英伦; born 1938) is a Chinese translator. He is famous for his research and translation of French literary works.

== Biography ==
Zhang was born in Bengbu, Anhui, in 1938. In 1962 he graduated from Peking University, where he majored in French language and literature. Then he studied and worked at the Chinese Academy of Social Sciences as a researcher. He has been living in France since 1988 and has served as a research fellow in charge of the French National Centre for Scientific Research. He joined the China Writers Association in 1983.

== Works ==
- 敬隐渔传 [Biography of Jing Yinyu] (in Chinese). Beijing: People's Literature Publishing House. 2016. ISBN 9787020117871.
- Da zhong ma 大仲马 [Alexandre Dumas] (in Chinese). Liaoning: Liaohai Publishing House. 1998. ISBN 9787806388990.

== Translations ==
- La Reine Margot (玛尔戈王后)
- Selection of Maupassant's Short Stories (莫泊桑短篇小说选)
