= Chicot =

French jester

Chicot (c. 1540–1591), real name Jean-Antoine d'Anglerais, was the jester of King Henry III of France and later Henry IV. He spoke with the king without formalities.

== Biography ==
Chicot was born in Gascony in 1540. He had a strong military background, he served as a soldier under Honorat II of Savoy. He then served as a jester under King Henry III of France and then later Henry IV of France. He was the only known jester who led an active political and military life; he was allowed to carry a rapier, and he was also known for his skill with the blade.

This is how John L. Motley in his work History of the United Netherlands From the Death of William the Silent to the Twelve Years' Truce, 1609 describes his death during the campaign of 1591 of Henry IV against the army of Catholic League: 'They [i.e. Leaguers] were closely followed by Henry at the head of his cavalry, and lively skirmishes were of frequent occurrence. In a military point of view none of these affairs were of consequence, but there was one which partook at once of the comic and the pathetic. For it chanced that in a cavalry action of more than common vivacity the Count Chaligny found himself engaged in a hand-to-hand conflict with a very dashing swordsman, who, after dealing and receiving many severe blows, at last succeeded in disarming the count and taking him prisoner. It was the fortune of war, and, but a few days before, might have been the fate of the great Henry himself. But Chaligny's mortification at his captivity became intense when he discovered that the knight to whom he had surrendered was no other than the king's jester! That he, a chieftain of the Holy League, the long-descended scion of the illustrious house of Lorraine, brother of the great Duke of Mercœur, should become the captive of a Huguenot buffoon, seemed the most stinging jest yet perpetrated since fools had come in fashion. The famous Chicot, who was as fond of a battle as of a gibe, and who was almost as reckless a rider as his master, proved on this occasion that the cap and bells could cover as much magnanimity as did the most chivalrous crest. Although desperately wounded in the struggle which had resulted in his triumph, he generously granted to the count his freedom without ransom. The proud Lorrainer returned to his Leaguers, and the poor fool died afterward of his wounds.'

== In fiction ==
- Alexandre Dumas, père:
  - La Dame de Monsoreau (1846) (a.k.a. Chicot the Jester)
  - The Forty-Five Guardsmen (1847)
- Chicot appears also in the novel by Heinrich Mann: Die Vollendung des Königs Henri Quatre (Fulfillment of the King Henry IV).
- He also appears as a legendary joker in the Poker-themed video game Balatro.

== See also ==
- List of jesters

== Sources ==
- Louis Maïeul Chaudon, Antoine-François Delandine. Nouveau dictionnaire historique, ou, Histoire abrégée de tous les hommes qui se sont fait un nom par une société de gens-de-lettres. Société des gens de lettres de France, G. Le Roy, 1786.
- Beatrice K. Otto. Fools are Everywhere: The Court Jester Around the World. University of Chicago Press, 2001.
- Doran, John. The History of Court Fools. R. Bentley, 1858.
