= Joseph Boniface de La Môle =

French nobleman

Joseph Boniface de La Môle (c. 1526 – 30 April 1574) was a French nobleman. He was the son of Jacques Boniface, seigneur de la Môle et de Colobrières, of Marseille.

== Life ==
La Môle was the Provençal lover of Marguerite de Valois, among others, during the early part of her marriage to King Henri III of Navarre, the future king of France (Henry IV).

He served François, Duke of Anjou and Alençon, Marguerite's brother and youngest son of King Henry II of France and Catherine de' Medici. He represented the Duc d'Alençon during marriage negotiations with Queen Elizabeth I of England in 1572. In 1574 he was implicated in a Malcontent conspiracy against the reigning king, Charles IX, who was gravely ill, supported by the duke of Alençon. He was accused of making an attempt on the king's life when a wax figurine pricked with needles, which he had obtained from the astrologer Cosimo Ruggeri, was found in his possession. After being subjected to questioning and torture, he was condemned to death. He was quartered and beheaded at the Place de Grève in Paris with his co-conspirator, Annibal de Coconas. It has been rumoured that Marguerite embalmed la Môle's head and kept it in a jewelled casket.

== Popular culture ==
- William Shakespeare seems to have heard of the incident. In Act IV, scene I of 2 Henry VI, the character William de la Pole, Duke of Suffolk and lover of Queen Margaret, is beheaded. In scene IV, Margaret brings his head to a conference at the palace, where she weeps over and embraces it.
- A major character of Alexandre Dumas' novel La Reine Margot, la Môle is transformed into Joseph-Hyacinthe Boniface de Lerac de la Mole, a Protestant nobleman saved by Queen Marguerite during the St. Bartholomew's Day massacre. The figure who was saved after stumbling into the Queen's bed chamber was not, in fact, la Môle, who took part in the Massacre, but rather was a gentleman named M. de Teian.
- Fictional descendants of La Môle also feature prominently in Stendhal's novel The Red and the Black.
- He is portrayed by Swiss actor Vincent Pérez in the film La Reine Margot and Dmitry Kharatyan in the Russian miniseries "Queen Margot" ("Королева Марго" (1996)).
