= War of the Three Henrys =

1585–89 war in the French Wars of Religion

- Part of French Wars of Religion
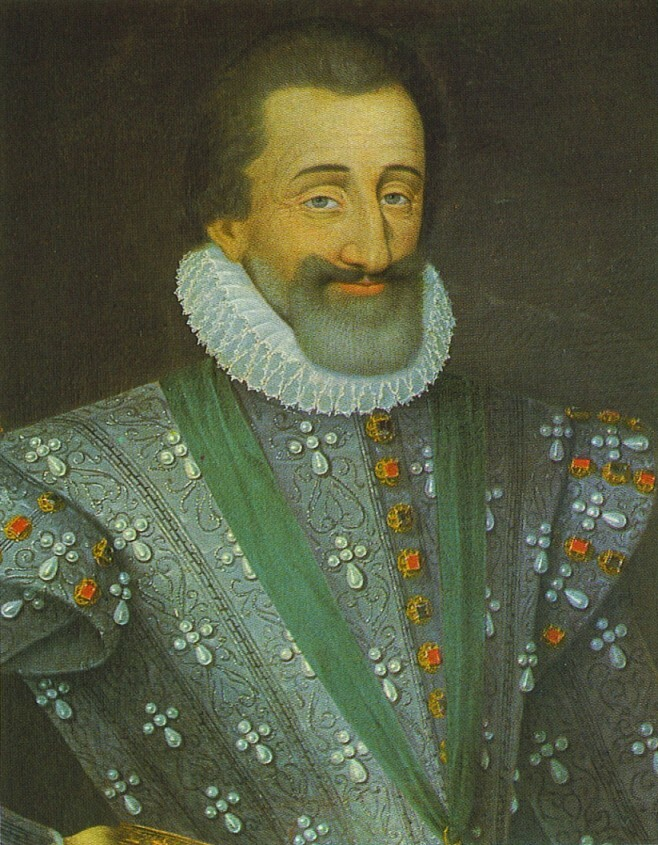
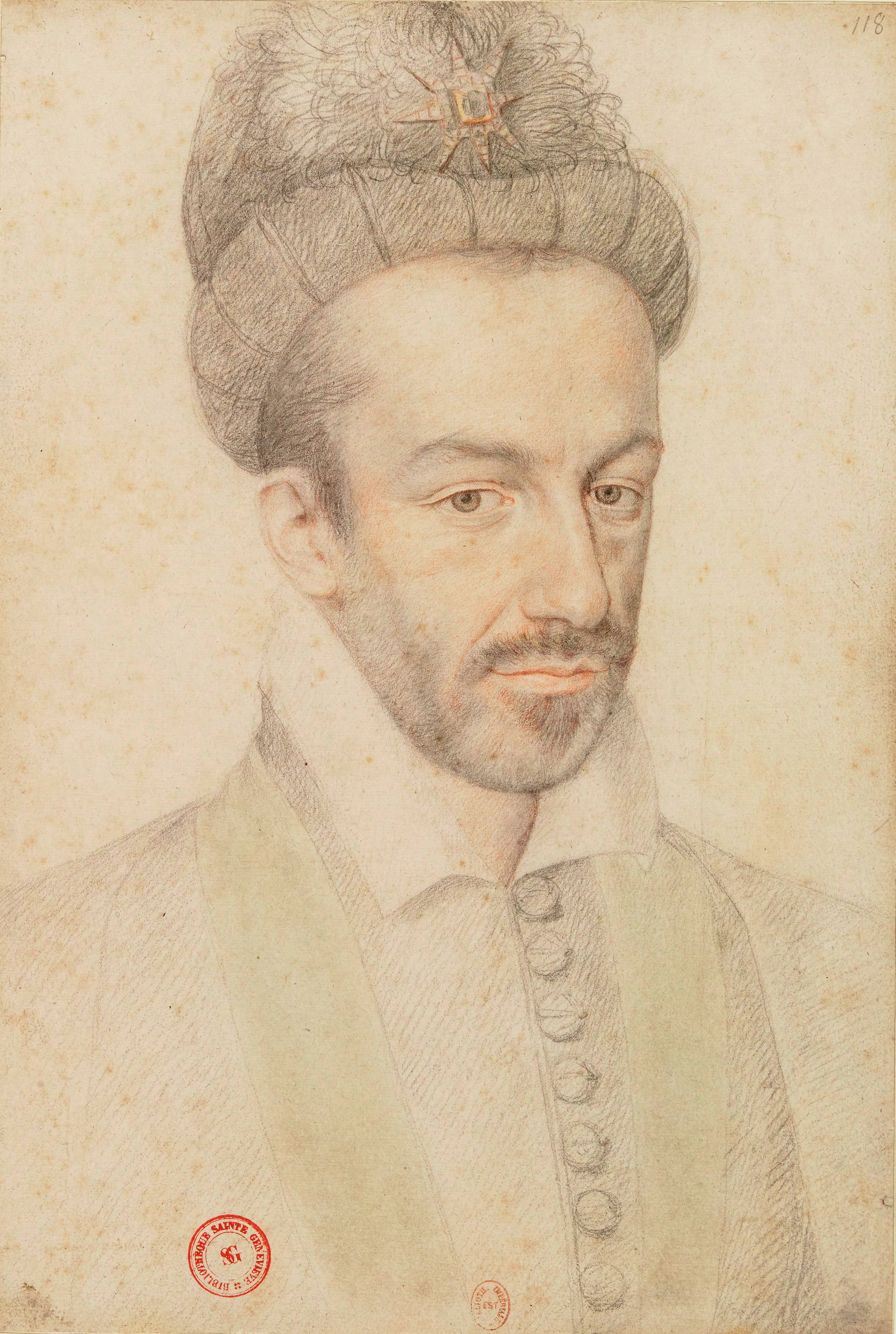
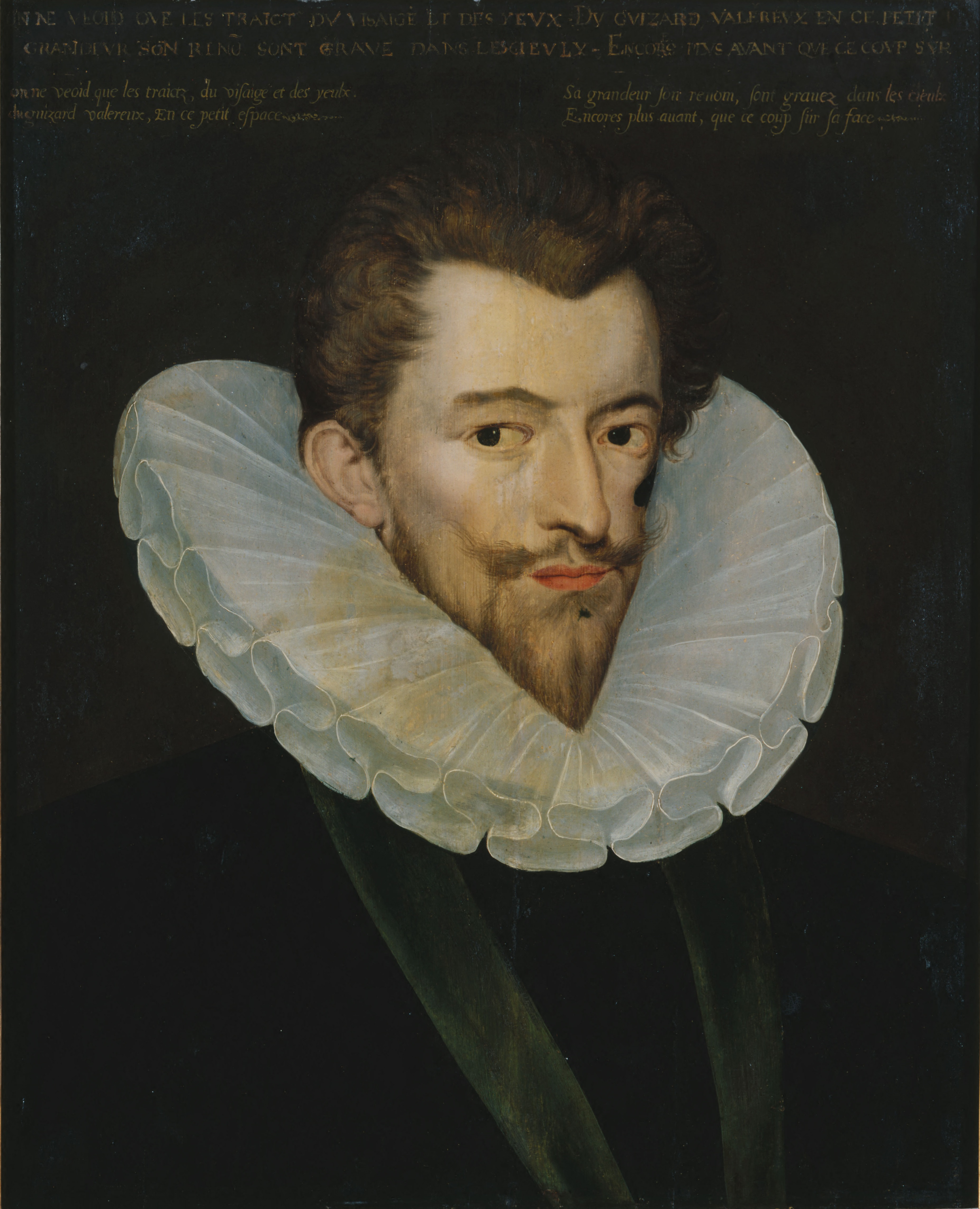
- The Three Henrys Henry of Navarre Henry III of France Henry of Guise
Date	1585–1589
Location	France
Result	Henry of Navarre outlives the other Henrys and becomes the King of France: House of Bourbon replaces the House of Valois as the Royal House of France

Belligerents
Protestants: Huguenots; England	(Kingdom of France) Politiques	Catholics: Catholic League; Spain; Duchy of Savoy

Commanders and leaders
Henry of Navarre; Henri, Prince of Condé (1552–1588)	Henry III of France X; Duke of Mercœur; Anne, Duke of Joyeuse †; Jean, Duke of Épernon	Henry I, Duke of Guise X; Charles, Duke of Mayenne

The War of the Three Henrys (French: Guerre des trois Henri), also known as the Eighth War of Religion (French: Huitième guerre de Religion), took place during 1585–1589, and was the eighth conflict in the series of civil wars in France known as the French Wars of Religion. (Note: Nolan (2006) wrote about "the Eighth Civil War (1585–1589)", but also the so-called "War of the Three Henries" (1587–1589).) It was a three-way war fought between King Henry III of France, supported by the royalists and the politiques; King Henry of Navarre, later Henry IV of France, heir presumptive to the French throne and leader of the Huguenots, supported by Elizabeth I of England and the German Protestant princes; and Henry of Lorraine, Duke of Guise, leader of the Catholic League, funded and supported by Philip II of Spain.

The underlying cause of the war was the looming royal succession crisis from the death of heir presumptive, Francis, Duke of Anjou (Henry III's brother), on 10 June 1584, which made the Protestant Henry of Navarre heir to the throne of the childless Henry III, whose death would extinguish the House of Valois. On 31 December 1584, the Catholic League allied itself with Philip II of Spain by the Treaty of Joinville.

The war began when the Catholic League convinced (or forced) King Henry III to issue the Treaty of Nemours (7 July 1585), an edict outlawing Protestantism and annulling Henry of Navarre's right to the throne. Henry III was possibly influenced by the royal favourite, Anne de Joyeuse. In September 1585, Pope Sixtus V excommunicated both Henry of Navarre and his cousin and leading general Henri, Prince of Condé to remove them from the royal succession.

== Course ==
=== 1585 ===
For the first part of the war, the royalists and the Catholic League were uneasy allies against their common enemy, the Huguenots. Philippe Emmanuel, Duke of Mercœur, a prominent member of the Catholic League and governor of Brittany since 1582, conducted campaigns against the Protestants in 1585, 1587 and 1588, but was repeatedly defeated and forced to flee, thereby establishing his reputation as a poor warrior (he was jokingly nicknamed "duc de Recule" (the "Duke of Retreat") by Pierre de Bourdeille, seigneur de Brantôme). In the opening phase, Mercœur invaded Poitou in 1585 and fought against Henri, Prince of Condé in the battle of Fontenay-le-Comte. Condé forced him to retreat back across the river Loire, capturing most of his baggage train and the spoils of war Mercœur had obtained at the beginning of his campaign, as well as taking several groups of Mercœur's soldiers prisoner of war. In October 1585, Condé conducted the Siege of Brouage, but had to lift it when the castle of Angers was seized by treason, and then descended into fighting between various factions. By the time Condé arrived at Angers on 21 October, the castle was in the hands of 6,000 royalist enemies. He quickly retreated as his Protestant army was thrown into confusion, disarray and harassed by royalist forces. Condé's army fell apart during his flight, with some escaping, while those captured were frequently put to death by Catholic forces.

=== 1586 ===
In early 1586, Henry of Navarre's forces were far inferior to his opponents, and he sought to strengthen his position and build his army by buying time and avoiding a general engagement. To that end, Navarre published several declarations in which he lamented the miseries of war, denounced those fighting, and argued that he himself was not to be blamed for it, addressing the clergy (in reference to Pontius Pilate washing his hands in Matthew 27:24–25) with the words: "If war delights you so much, if you prefer a battle to an argument, and a conspiracy to a council, I wash my hands of it, and the blood which may be shed shall be on your heads." In February 1586, the Prince of Condé occupied La Rochelle and the isle of Oléron and turned them into Huguenot strongholds. In early April 1586, St. Luc, the governor of Brouage, attacked La Rochelle for 24 hours with 5,000 troops, but was forced to retreat by the Protestant defenders, losing 400 soldiers and much of his baggage. Condé won a costly Huguenot victory at Saintes afterwards. In late 1586, Armand de Gontaut, baron de Biron besieged Marans, an important town providing access to La Rochelle, during which he was wounded. Henry of Navarre personally came to reinforce the region's fortifications and boost morale. A messenger from Henry III requested both parties to cease hostilities and hold peace talks, leading Biron to withdraw and Navarre to promise to meet Henry III. The negotiations soon broke down amidst mistrust, not only between the two Henrys, but also between Henry III and the Catholic League (including Charles, Duke of Mayenne, one of his leading generals who failed to accomplish anything in the field and blamed Henry III for his failures).

=== 1587 ===
The Battle of Jarrie (19 August 1587) was a Catholic victory. Henry III sent Joyeuse into the field against Navarre, while he himself intended to meet the approaching German and Swiss armies. At the Battle of Coutras (20 October 1587), Navarre, with English financial aid, defeated the royal army led by Joyeuse; the duke himself was executed after the battle. It was the first victory won by the Huguenots on the battlefield. For his part, Henry III successfully prevented the junction of the German and Swiss armies. The Swiss were his allies, and had come to invade France to free him from subjection; but Henry III insisted that their invasion was not in his favor, but against him, forcing them to return home. The Germans, led by Fabien I, Burgrave of Dohna, wanted to fight against the Duke of Guise, in order to win a victory like Coutras. He recruited some of the retreating Swiss, who had no scruples about fighting against Guise. But at the Battle of Vimory (26 October 1587), Guise took the Germans by surprise, and routed them.

=== 1588 ===
In Paris, the glory of repelling the German and Swiss Protestants all fell to the Duke of Guise. The king's actions were viewed with contempt. They thought that the king had invited the Swiss to invade, paid them for coming, and sent them back again. The king, who had really performed the decisive part in the campaign, and expected to be honored for it, was astounded that public voice should thus declare against him. The Catholic League had put its preachers to good use. In the meantime, the governments of Normandy and Picardy were vacated by the deaths of Joyeuse and Henri, Prince of Condé. Guise demanded Normandy for himself, and Picardy for his kinsman Charles, Duke of Aumale. The king denied both requests. The Catholic League was mobilized to resist the royal appointees in these provinces. Guise was forbidden from entering the capital. Guise ignored the prohibition and entered Paris. In the normal course of affairs, this would have cost him his life, but the duke was popular with the masses. Further, after the Day of the Barricades, an uprising planned in part by the Spanish diplomat Bernardino de Mendoza, the king decided to flee to Blois.

After the defeat of the Spanish Armada in 1588, the king called the Estates-General in the midst of intrigue and plotting. Henry of Guise planned to assassinate the king and seize the throne, but the king struck first by having Guise killed by his guards, The Forty-Five.

=== 1589 ===
Open war erupted between the royalists and the Catholic League. Charles, Duke of Mayenne, Guise's younger brother, took over the leadership of the League. At the moment it seemed that Henry III could not possibly resist his enemies. His power was effectively limited to Blois, Tours, and the surrounding districts. In these dark times, the King of France finally reached out to his cousin and heir, the King of Navarre. Henry III declared that he would no longer allow Protestants to be called heretics, while the Protestants revived the strict principles of royalty and divine right. As on the other side ultra-Catholic and anti-royalist doctrines were closely associated, so on the side of the two kings the principles of tolerance and royalism were united. Henry III sought the aid of the Swiss, who were ready to join his cause. The Catholic royalists revived in their allegiance. At Pontoise the king saw himself at the head of 40,000 men. His newly recovered power may have inspired him with great designs; he planned to take Paris, in order to end the League's power once and for all. The surrender of Paris seemed likely, even to the inhabitants. The preachers of the League sanctioned regicide, to avenge the murder of Guise. Jacques Clément, a fanatical Catholic friar, assassinated King Henry III at Saint-Cloud in August 1589.

With Henry III's death, the coalition broke up. Many Catholic royalists were unwilling to serve the Protestant Henry IV, and the army retreated from Paris.

== Aftermath ==
In the spring, the extant Henry III of Navarre returned to the field; he won significant victories at Arques and Ivry and laid siege to Paris (despite being greatly outnumbered), but a Spanish army under Alexander Farnese, Duke of Parma lifted the siege.

Deciding that further fighting was not worth the cost, Henry converted to Catholicism in July 1593. He entered Paris on 22 March 1594 and was welcomed with jubilation.

The French Wars of Religion lasted several more years, as League diehards and Spanish troops continued to resist the reunification of France. But once those were dealt with, Henry IV's reign inaugurated a time of peace and prosperity.

== See also ==
- Instruction of 12 April 1588

== Bibliography ==
- Holt, Mack P. (2005). The French wars of religion, 1562–1629. ISBN 9780608365909.
- Knecht, Robert J. (2014). Hero or Tyrant? Henry III, King of France, 1574–1589. ISBN 978-1-4724-2930-8.
- Kohn, George Childs (2013). Dictionary of Wars. Revised Edition. London/New York: Routledge. ISBN 9781135954949.
- Nolan, Cathal J. (2006). The Age of Wars of Religion, 1000–1650: An Encyclopedia of Global Warfare and Civilization, Volume 2. London: Greenwood Publishing Group. p. 1076. ISBN 978-0313337345.
- Pitts, Vincent J. (2009). Henri IV of France, His Reign and Age. ISBN 978-0-8018-9027-7.
- von Ranke, Leopold (2024) [1852]. Civil Wars and Monarchy in France (in German). London: Forgotten Books. ISBN 1330912179.
- Ritter, Raymond (1991). "Henry IV". The New Encyclopædia Britannica. Vol. 5 (15 ed.). pp. 843–845. ISBN 0-85229-529-4.
