= La Dame de Monsoreau =

1846 novel by Alexandre Dumas

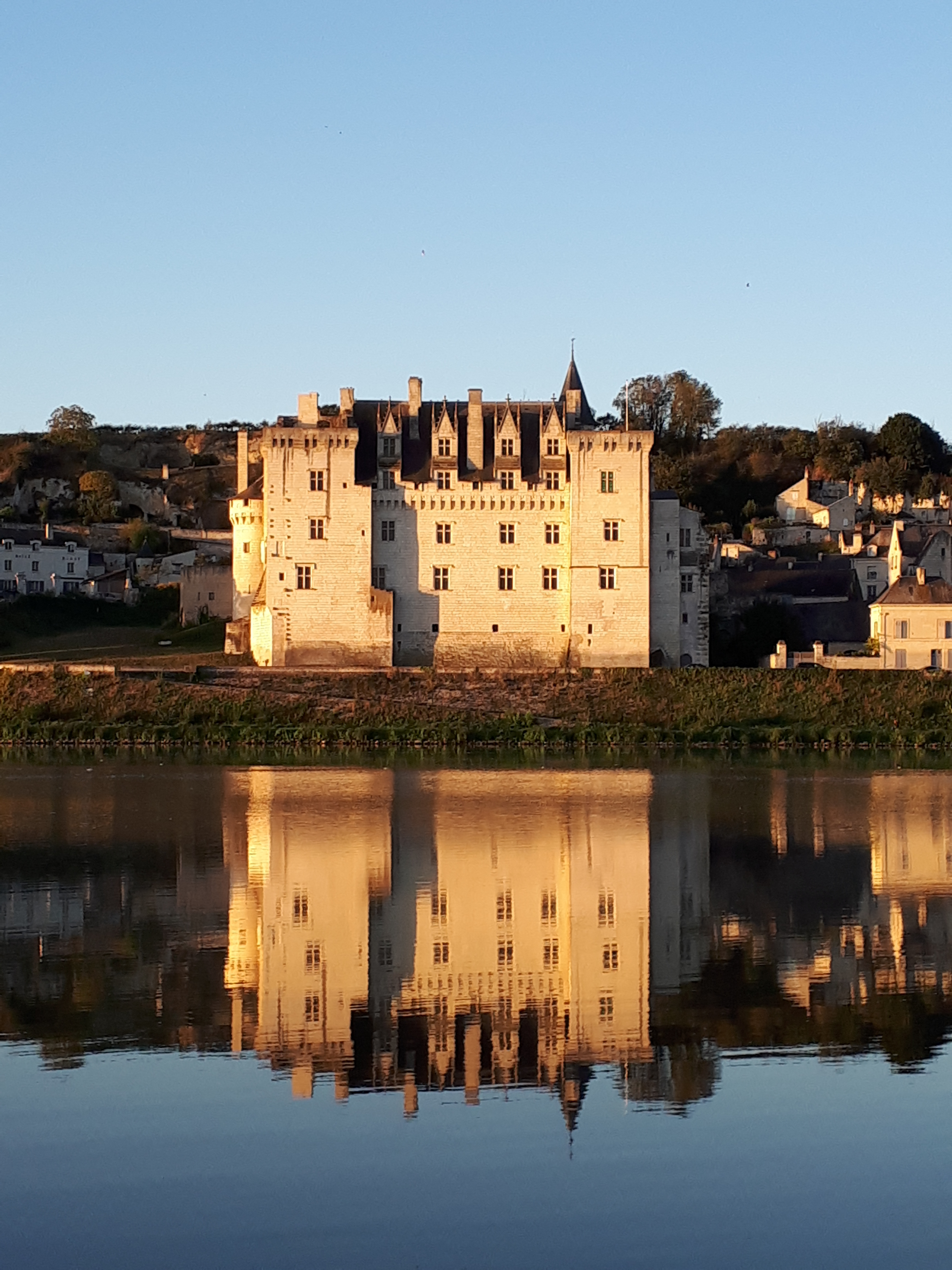
- Château de Montsoreau, 1455, Val de Loire
- Author: Alexandre Dumas in collaboration with Auguste Maquet
- Original title: La Dame de Montsoreau
- Language: French
- Genre: Historical novel
- Publication date: 1846 (serialized)
- Publication place: France
- Preceded by: La Reine Margot
- Followed by: The Forty-Five Guardsmen

La Dame de Monsoreau is a historical novel by Alexandre Dumas, père published, serialized, in 1846. It is one of Dumas' seven "Valois Romances" and owes its name to the counts who owned the Château de Montsoreau.

Set in 1578 France, the story weaves together political intrigue and forbidden love during the turbulent reign of Henri III. The brave gentleman Count de Bussy falls in love with Diana de Méridor, who owes a debt to the Count de Monsoreau. Conspiracies swirl around the king, his jealous brother the Duke of Anjou, and the powerful Catholic League plotting to seize the throne.

In some English translations, the title of this book is Chicot the Jester; Chicot was jester to King Henry III, and Henry IV, and was the only known jester who led an active political and military life.
