= Henry III of France =

King of France from 1574 to 1589

Henry III
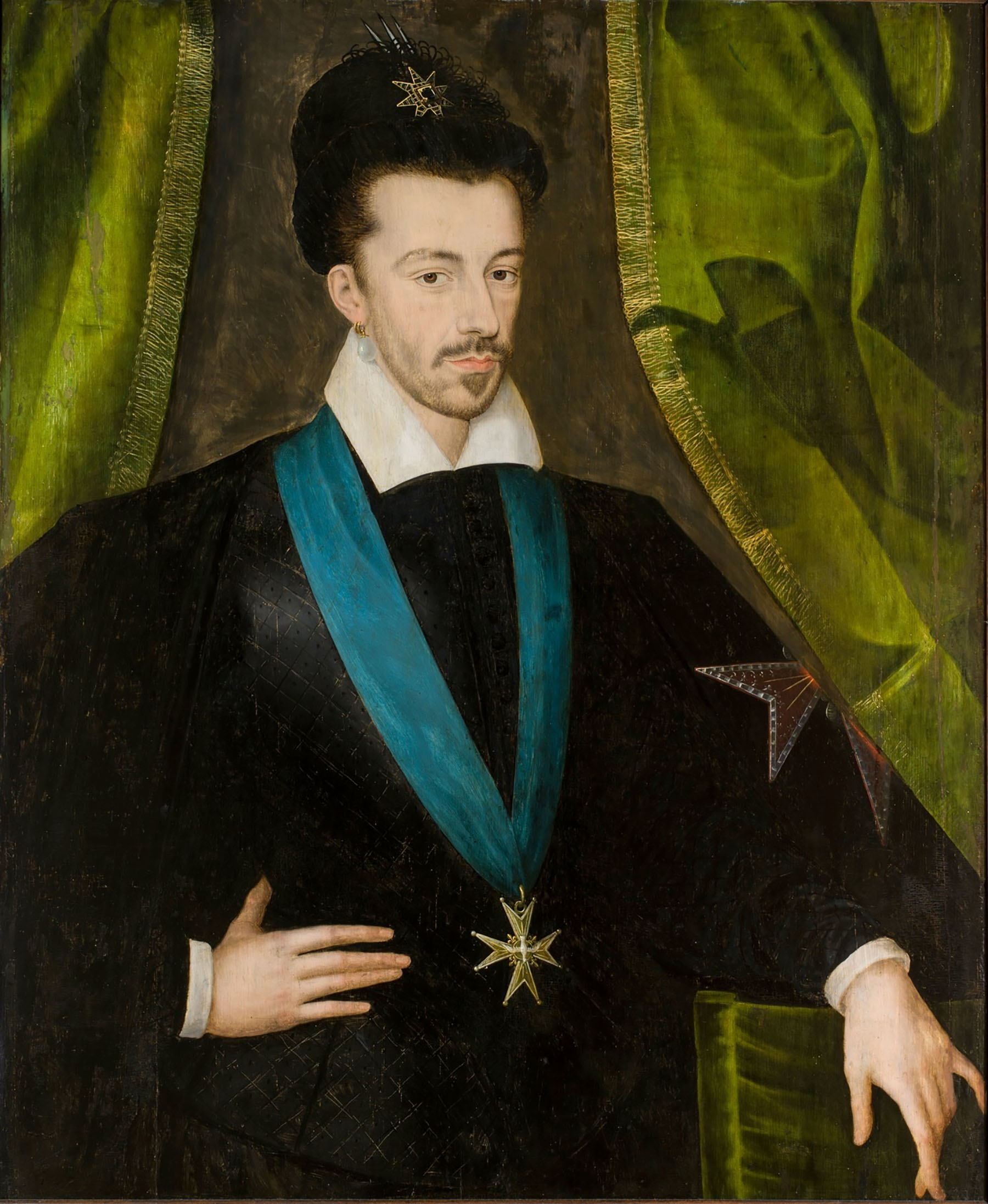
- Portrait by Étienne Dumonstier, c. 1580–1586

King of France
- Reign: 30 May 1574 – 2 August 1589
- Coronation: 13 February 1575; Reims Cathedral
- Predecessor: Charles IX
- Successor: Henry IV

King of Poland Grand Duke of Lithuania
- Reign: 16 May 1573 – 12 May 1575
- Coronation: 22 February 1574, Wawel
- Predecessor: Sigismund II Augustus
- Successor: Anna
- Interrex: Jakub Uchański
- Born: Alexandre Édouard, duc d'Angoulême; 19 September 1551; Château de Fontainebleau, France
- Died: 2 August 1589 (aged 37); Château de Saint-Cloud, France
- Cause of death: Assassination
- Burial: Basilica of Saint-Denis, France
- Spouse: Louise of Lorraine (m. 1575)
- House: Valois-Angoulême
- Father: Henry II of France
- Mother: Catherine de' Medici
- Religion: Catholicism

Henry III of France (French: Henri III, né Alexandre Édouard; 19 September 1551 – 2 August 1589) was King of France from 1574 until his assassination in 1589 and, as Henry of Valois (Polish: Henryk Walezy; Lithuanian: Henrikas Valua), King of Poland and Grand Duke of Lithuania from 1573 to 1575. Before he came to these thrones, he was known as the Duke of Angoulême and Duke of Orléans from 1560, then as Duke of Anjou from 1566.

As the fourth son of King Henry II of France and Queen Catherine de' Medici, he was not expected to inherit the French throne and thus was a good candidate for the vacant throne of the Polish–Lithuanian Commonwealth, where he was elected monarch in 1573. During his brief rule, he refused to sign the Henrician Articles into law, which would recognise the szlachta's right to freely elect their monarch. The Henrician Articles became, nonetheless, deeply rooted in Poland's politics as all his successors accepted them. Aged 22, Henry abandoned Poland–Lithuania upon inheriting the French throne when his brother, Charles IX of France, died without issue.

France was at the time plagued by the Wars of Religion, and Henry's authority was undermined by violent political factions funded by foreign powers: the Catholic League (supported by Spain and the Pope), the Protestant Huguenots (supported by England and the Dutch) and the Malcontents (led by Henry's own brother Francis, Duke of Anjou and Alençon, a party of Catholic and Protestant aristocrats who jointly opposed the absolutist ambitions of the king). Henry III was himself a politique, arguing that only a strong and centralised yet religiously tolerant monarchy would save France from collapse.

After the death of Henry's younger brother Francis, Duke of Anjou, and when it became apparent that Henry would not father an heir, the Wars of Religion developed into a dynastic war known as the War of the Three Henrys. Under Salic Law, Henry III's heir presumptive was his distant cousin, King Henry III of Navarre, a Protestant. The Catholic League, led by Henry I, Duke of Guise, demanded the exclusion of all Protestant heirs from the line of succession. They instead championed the Catholic Charles, Cardinal of Bourbon, as Henry III's heir presumptive.

Henry had the Duke of Guise murdered in 1588 and was in turn assassinated by Jacques Clément, a Catholic League fanatic, in 1589. He was succeeded by Henry of Navarre.

== Early life ==
=== Childhood ===
Henry was born at the royal Château de Fontainebleau, as Alexandre Édouard, duc de Angoulême, the fourth son of King Henry II and Catherine de' Medici. He was a grandson of Francis I of France and Claude of France. His older brothers were Francis II of France, Charles IX of France, and Louis of Valois. He was made Duke of Angoulême and Duke of Orléans in 1560, then Duke of Anjou in 1566.

He was his mother's favourite; she called him chers yeux ("precious eyes") and lavished fondness and affection upon him for most of his life. His elder brother, Charles, grew to detest him, partially because he resented his better health.

The royal children were raised under the supervision of Diane de Poitiers, his father's mistress.

=== Youth ===
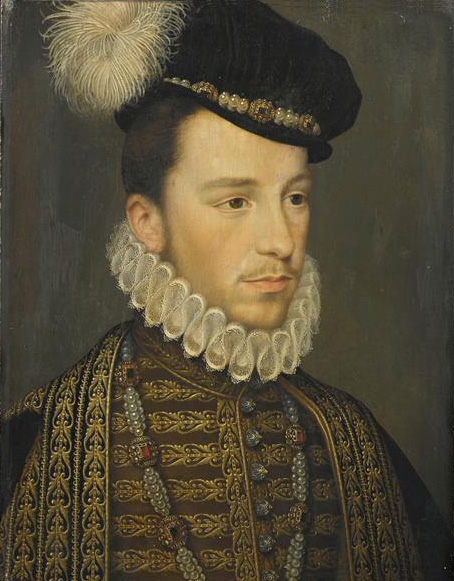
Portrait of Henry when he was Duke of Anjou by Jean de Court (1570)

Although he was skilled and fond of fencing, he preferred to indulge his tastes for the arts and reading. These predilections were attributed to his Italian mother. Henry's favourite interests were hunting and riding.

At one point in his youth, Henry showed a tendency towards Protestantism as a means of rebelling. At the age of nine, he called himself "a little Huguenot", attended Mass only to please his mother, sang Protestant psalms to his sister Margaret (exhorting her all the while to change her religion and cast her Book of Hours into the fire), and even bit the nose off a statue of Saint Paul. His mother firmly cautioned him against such behaviour, and he would never again show any Protestant tendencies. Instead, he became staunchly Catholic.

In the factional dispute that engulfed France in the wake of Henry II's death in 1559, Henry was solicited by Henry, son of Francis, Duke of Guise, at the behest of Jacques, Duke of Nemours, to run away from court to be a figurehead for the ultra-Catholics. However, the plot was uncovered before any action could be taken.

Henry was known as a flâneur, who relished leisurely strolls through Paris and partook in the sociability in the busiest of neighbourhoods. He revelled in fairs, music, bilboquet and court masques. His extravagance in court entertainments cut him off from the common people. He was also a devout Catholic who introduced pious reforms into the city and he encouraged the French church to follow the edicts of the Council of Trent.

=== Sexuality ===
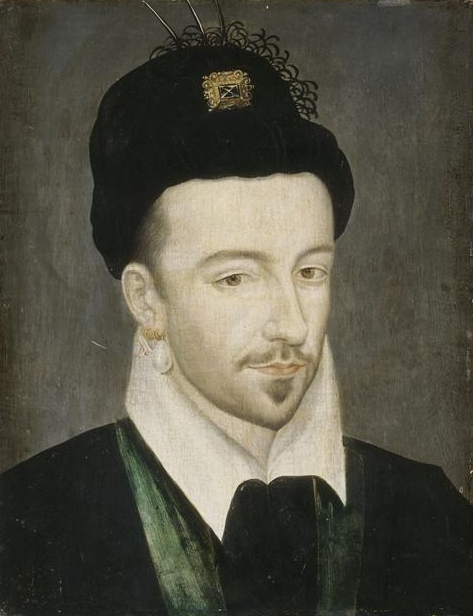
Henry III (c. 1575)

Reports that Henry engaged in same-sex relations with his court favourites, known as the mignons, date back to his own time. He was known to have enjoyed intense relationships with them. The scholar Louis Crompton maintains that all of the contemporary rumours about Henry were true. However, some modern historians have disputed this: Jean-Francois Solnon, Nicolas Le Roux, and Jacqueline Boucher have noted that Henry had many famous mistresses, that he was well known for his taste in beautiful women, and that no male sex partners have been identified. They concluded that the idea he was homosexual was promoted by his political opponents (both Protestant and Catholic) who used his dislike of war to depict him as effeminate and undermine his reputation with the French people. The portrait of a self-indulgent homosexual incapable of fathering an heir to the throne proved useful in efforts by the Catholic League to secure the succession for Cardinal Charles de Bourbon after 1585. Robert Knecht maintained that the mignons themselves were "not homosexuals" either, "as is often assumed. Far from being effeminate, they were skilful swordsmen, who risked their lives in duels."

However, French Renaissance scholar Gary Ferguson considers such interpretations to be unconvincing: "It is difficult to reconcile the king whose use of favourites is so logically strategic with the man who goes to pieces when one of them dies." Katherine Crawford, by contrast, emphasises the problems Henry's reputation encountered because of his failure to produce an heir and the presence of his powerful mother at court, combined with his enemies' insistence on conflating patronage with favouritism and luxury with decadence.

Additionally, Robert Knecht remarks that Henry's "mignons" came from ancient and noble families from the French provinces who had served the French crown since the late XVth century - "Their elevation was part of a royal strategy aimed at strengthening the networks of fidélité over which their parents presided". The mignons were military commanders and were expected to raise troops in their provinces for the king if requested. Henry used his pool of minions to quickly fill newly opened important posts as they became available and thus reduce the influence of the Guises and their faction at the court. Marguerite de Navarre wrote in her memoirs that Henry poached several members of the household of his brother, duc d'Alençon, targeting those who came from the most important families. Henry attempted to further consolidate these networks by arranging marriages for his mignons. For example, one of his earliest mignons, Henri de Saint-Sulpice, belonged to an important family of Upper-Quercy, in southwestern France. In 1576, he married Catherine de Carmaing, a wealthy heiress whose family controlled neighboring Languedoc and Lauragais, following arrangements by the king. The minions were thus a critical component in Henry's attempts to create "a nobility tied exclusively to his person and capable of serving him far beyond the court". The concept of mignon only acquired pejorative connotations in the mid-sixteenth century when the Valois were replaced by the Bourbon dynasty.

=== Elizabeth ===
In 1570, discussions commenced arranging for Henry to court Queen Elizabeth I of England. Elizabeth, almost 37, was expected by many parties in her country to marry and produce an heir. However, nothing came of these discussions. In initiating them, Elizabeth is viewed by historians as having intended only to arouse the concern of Spain, rather than contemplate marriage seriously. Henry's mother felt the chance of marriage despite differing religious views (Henry was Catholic, Elizabeth Protestant) simply required personal sacrifice. Henry tactlessly referred to Elizabeth as a putain publique ("public whore") and made ridiculous remarks about their difference in age (he was 18 years younger at a time when such large age differences between spouses were not at all uncommon).

=== Wars of Religion ===
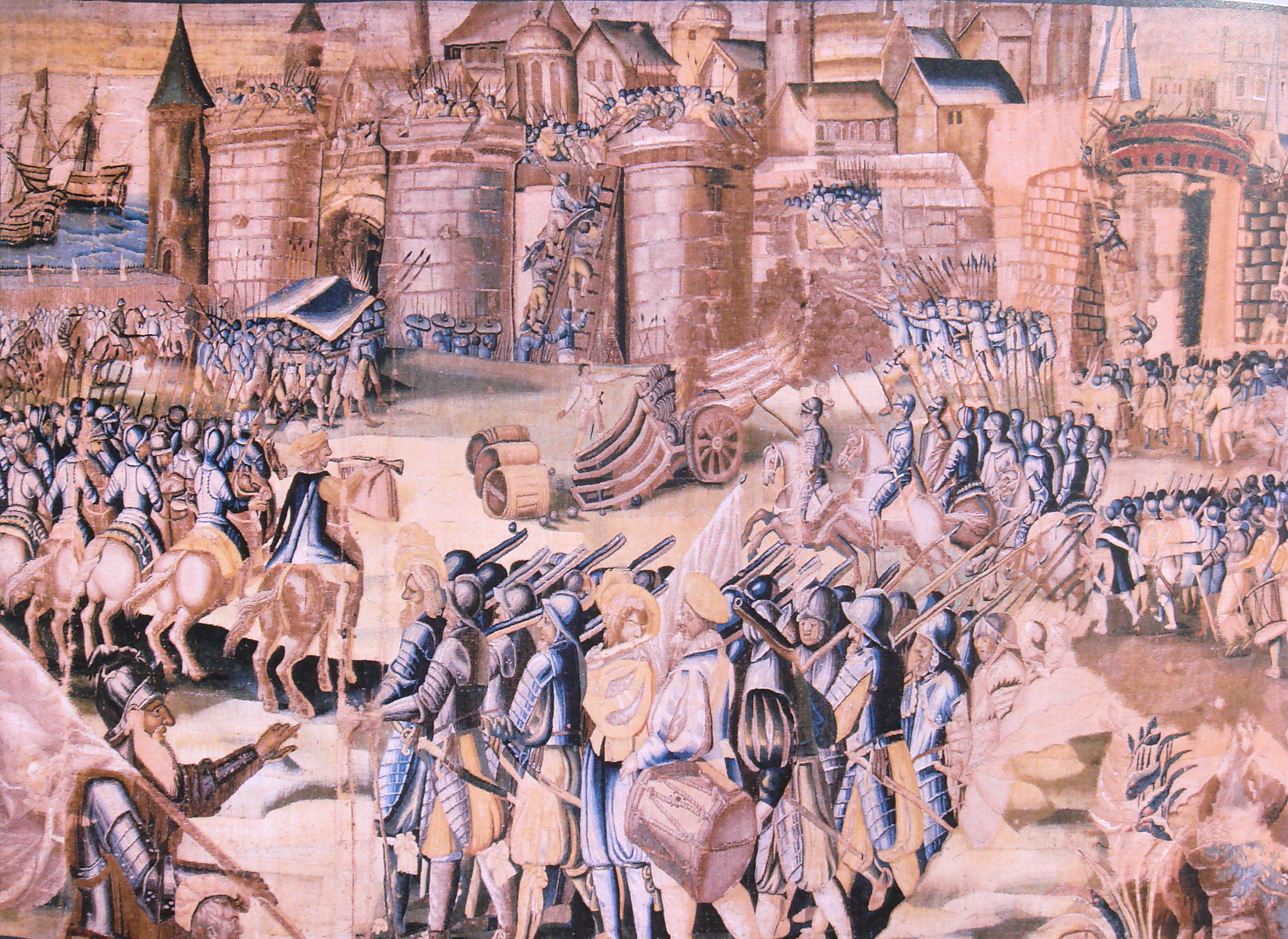
The Siege of La Rochelle by the Duke of Anjou in 1573 ("History of Henry III" tapestry, completed in 1623)

In November 1567, upon the death of Anne de Montmorency, Henry assumed the role of Lieutenant-General of France, placing him in nominal control of France's military. Henry served as a leader of the royal army, taking part in the victories over the Huguenots at the Battle of Jarnac (March 1569) and at the Battle of Moncontour (October 1569). At this time, he was a rallying point for the ultra-Catholics at court, who saw him as an opposition figure to the tolerant line being taken by the King, with Charles, Cardinal of Lorraine guiding his council. Lorraine offered him 200,000 Francs of Church revenue to become a protector of Catholicism, and tried to arrange his marriage to Mary, Queen of Scots; however, neither project took off.

While still Duke of Anjou, he helped plot the St. Bartholomew's Day Massacre of 1572. Though Henry did not participate directly, historian Thierry Wanegffelen sees him as the royal most responsible for the massacre, which involved the targeted killing of many Huguenot leaders. Henry III's reign as King of France, like those of his elder brothers Francis and Charles, would see France in constant turmoil over religion.

Henry continued to take an active role in the Wars of Religion, and in 1572/1573 led the siege of La Rochelle, a massive military assault on the Huguenot-held city. At the end of May 1573, Henry learned that the Polish szlachta had elected him King of Poland (a country with a large Protestant minority at the time) and political considerations forced him to negotiate an end to the siege. Negotiators reached an agreement on 24 June 1573, and Catholic troops ended the siege on 6 July 1573.

== King of Poland and Grand Duke of Lithuania (1574–1575) ==
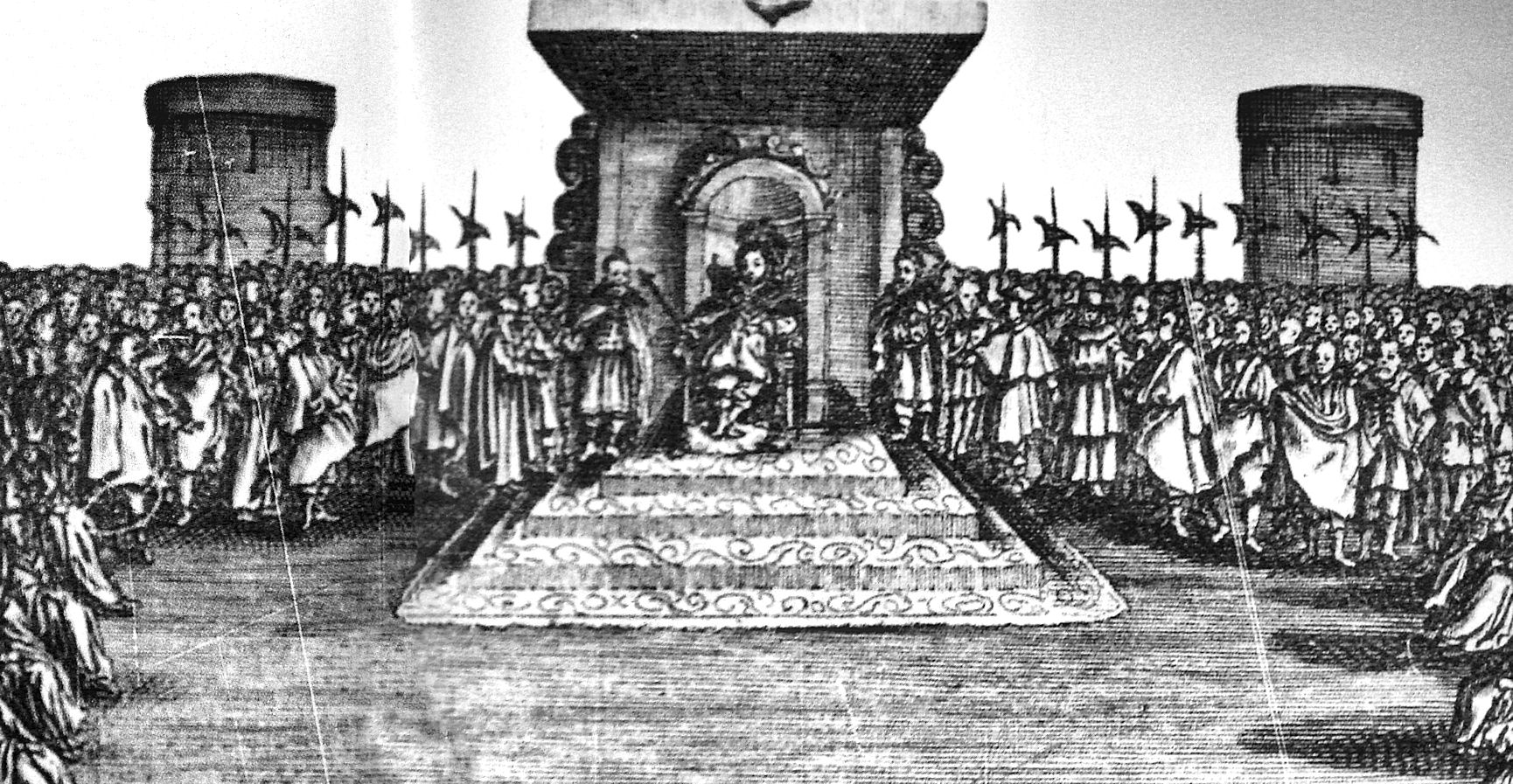
Henry III on the Polish throne, in front of the Sejm of the Polish–Lithuanian Commonwealth and aristocracy surrounded by halberdiers, 1574

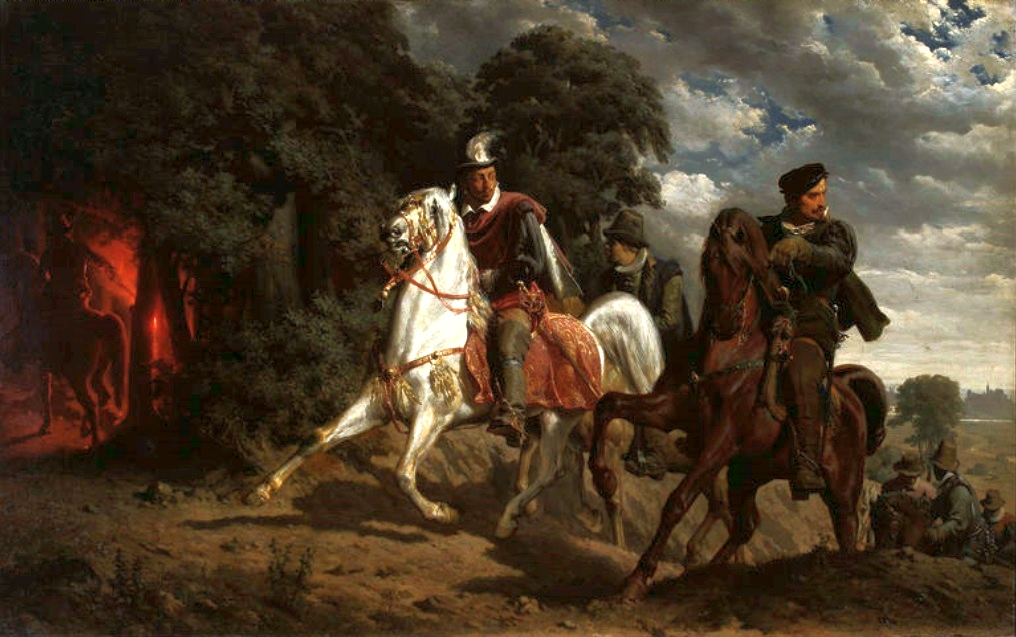
Escape of Henry III from Poland, by Artur Grottger, 1860

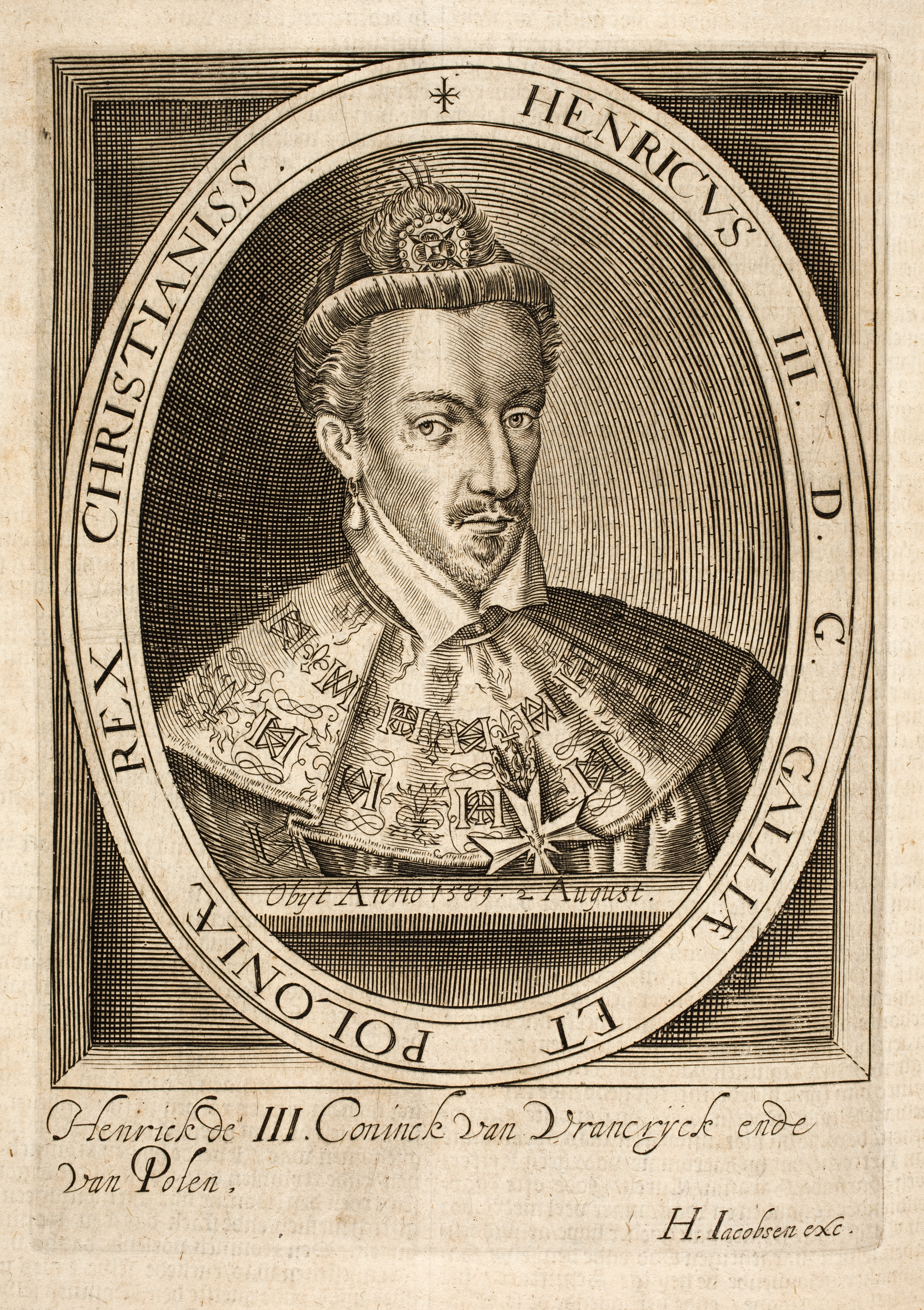
Engraving of Henry III

Following the death of the Polish ruler Sigismund II Augustus on 7 July 1572, Jean de Monluc was sent as the French envoy to Poland to negotiate the election of Henry to the Polish throne in exchange for military support against Russia, diplomatic assistance in dealing with the Ottoman Empire, and financial subsidies. Charles IX allowed Henry's envoys to give up to 50,000 écus to important people in Poland-Lithuania as a bribe, but this would increase to 100,000 each.

On 16 May 1573, Polish nobles chose Henry as the first elected monarch of the Polish–Lithuanian Commonwealth. The Lithuanian nobles boycotted this election, however, and it was left to the Lithuanian ducal council to confirm his election. The commonwealth elected Henry, rather than Habsburg candidates, partly in order to be more agreeable to the Ottoman Empire (a traditional ally of France through the Franco-Ottoman alliance) and strengthen a Polish-Ottoman alliance that was in effect. In addition to this, Henry was not a powerful ruler in his own right, as he was only a Prince, nor did France border the Commonwealth, so he would not have the capacity to strip the Polish nobility of their historic rights.

A Polish delegation went to La Rochelle to meet with Henry, who was leading the Siege of La Rochelle. Henry left the siege following their visit. In Paris, on 10 September, the Polish delegation asked Henry to take an oath, at Notre-Dame de Paris, to "respect traditional Polish liberties and the law on religious freedom that had been passed during the interregnum". As a condition of his election, he was compelled to sign the pacta conventa and the Henrician Articles, pledging religious tolerance in the Polish–Lithuanian Commonwealth. Henry chafed at the restrictions on monarchic power under the Polish-Lithuanian political system of "Golden Liberty". The Polish-Lithuanian parliament had been urged by Anna Jagiellon, the sister of the recently deceased king Sigismund II Augustus, to elect him based on the understanding that Henry would wed Anna afterward.

At a ceremony before the Parlement of Paris on 13 September, the Polish delegation handed over the "certificate of election to the throne of Poland-Lithuania". Henry also gave up any claims to succession and he "recognised the principle of free election" under the Henrician Articles and the pacta conventa.

It was not until January 1574 that Henry reached the borders of Poland. On 21 February, Henry's coronation was held in Kraków. In mid-June 1574, upon learning of the death of his brother Charles IX, Henry left Poland and headed back to France. Henry's absence provoked a constitutional crisis that the Parliament attempted to resolve by notifying Henry that his throne would be lost if he did not return from France by 12 May 1575. His failure to return caused Parliament to declare his throne vacant, though he never abandoned his claim.

The short reign of Henry at Wawel Castle in Poland was marked by a clash of cultures between the Polish and the French. The young king and his followers were astonished by several Polish practices and disappointed by the rural poverty and harsh climate of the country. The Poles, on the other hand, wondered if all Frenchmen were as concerned with their appearance as their new king appeared to be.

In many aspects, Polish culture had a positive influence on France. At Wawel, the French were introduced to new technologies of septic facilities, in which litter (excrement) was taken outside the castle walls. On returning to France, Henry wanted to order the construction of such facilities at the Louvre and other palaces.

In 1578, Henry created the Order of the Holy Spirit to commemorate his becoming the first King of Poland and later King of France on the Feast of Pentecost and gave it precedence over the earlier Order of St. Michael, which had lost much of its original prestige by being awarded too frequently and too readily. The Order would retain its prestige as the premier chivalric order of France until the end of the French monarchy.

== French reign (1574–1589) ==
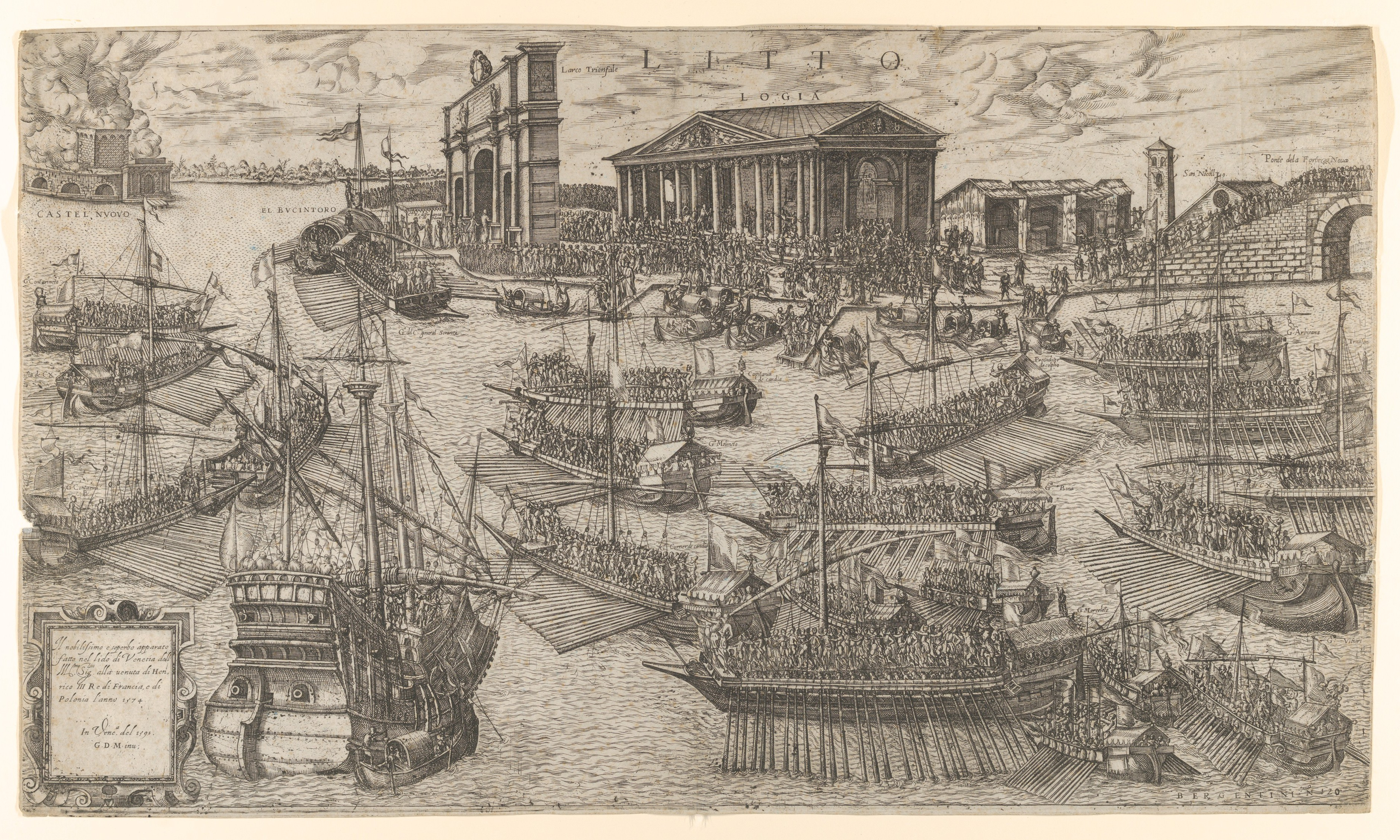
The arrival of Henry III of France in Venice, 1574

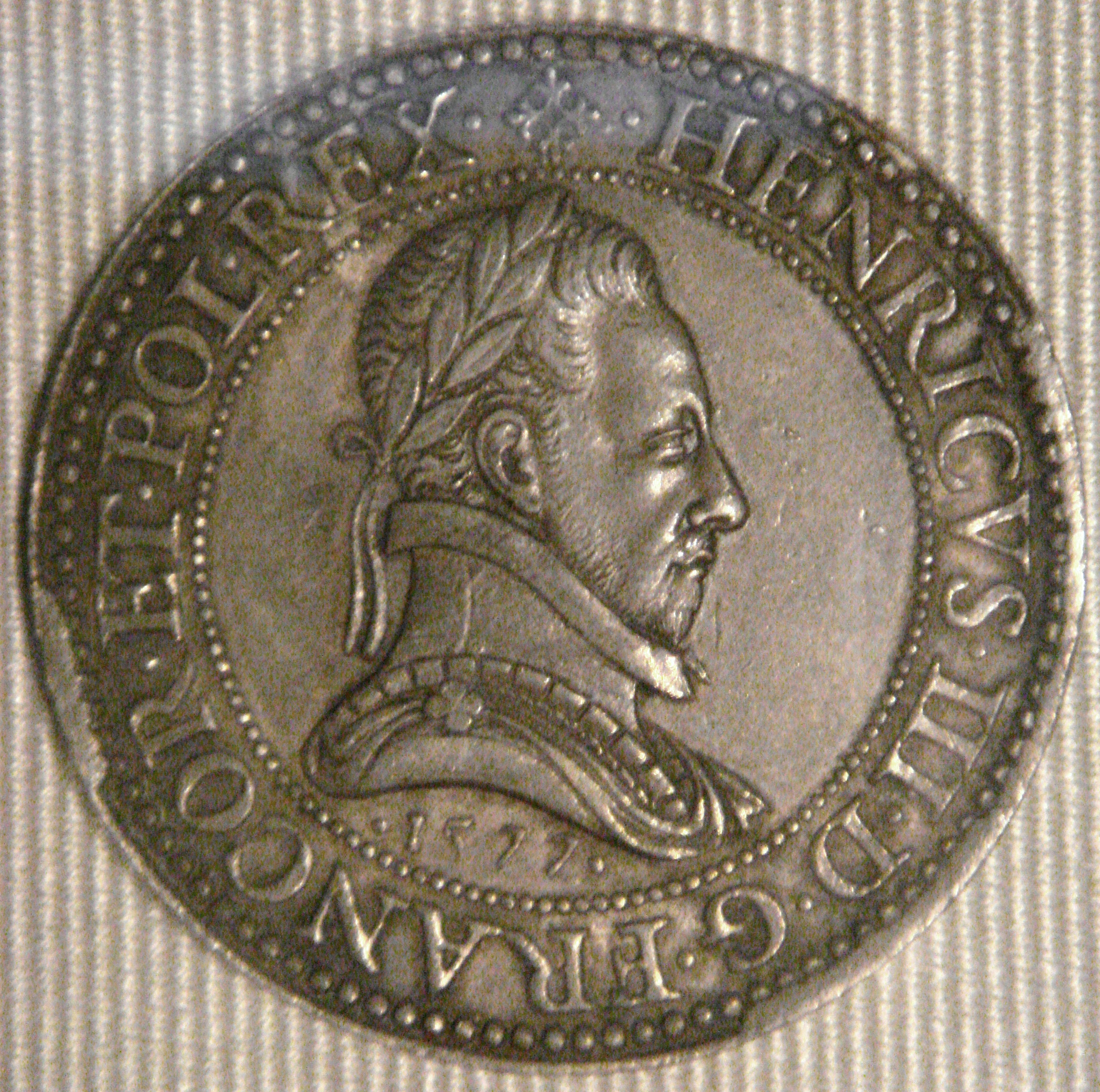
Coin of Henry III, 1577

Henry was crowned king of France on 13 February 1575 at Reims Cathedral. Although he was expected to produce an heir after he married the 21-year-old Louise of Lorraine on 14 February 1575, no issue resulted from their union.

In 1574, Henry renewed letters that gave Portuguese New Christians the right of settling in France.

In 1576, Henry signed the Edict of Beaulieu, which granted many concessions to the Huguenots. His action resulted in Henry I, Duke of Guise forming the Catholic League. After much posturing and negotiations, Henry was forced to rescind most of the concessions that had been made to the Protestants in the edict.

After 1582, Henry became convinced of the need for fiscal reform to break the cycle of expedients upon which he had relied. To this end he summoned an Assembly of Notables which met from November 1583 to February 1584. While he failed to convince them of his most radical tax plans, the notables forwarded a series of proposals to him which would be embodied in his legislation during 1584. As a result of these policies, the royal budget was almost balanced in 1585, before it was subject to political shock.

In 1584, the king's youngest brother and heir presumptive, Francis, Duke of Anjou, died. Under Salic Law, the next heir to the throne was Protestant Henry of Navarre, a descendant of Louis IX (Saint Louis). The possibility of a Protestant on the throne led to the War of the Three Henrys. Under pressure from the duke of Guise, Henry III issued an edict suppressing Protestantism and annulling Henry of Navarre's right to the throne.

Henry III, stung by the open disobedience of Guise, attempted a coup in May 1588 and sent royal Swiss troops into several neighbourhoods. This had the unintended effect of rallying the people against him and in favour of the more popular Guise during the Day of the Barricades. Henry III fled the city; he later sought support from the Parlement of Paris and propped up an anti-League establishment throughout France.

Following the defeat of the Spanish Armada that summer, the king's fear of Spanish support for the Catholic League apparently waned. Accordingly, on 23 December 1588, at the Château of Blois, he invited Guise to the council chamber where the duke's brother Louis II, Cardinal of Guise, already waited. The duke was told that the king wished to see him in the private room adjoining the royal bedroom. There, royal guardsmen murdered the duke, then the cardinal. To make certain that no contender for the French throne was free to act against him, the king had the duke's son imprisoned. The Duke of Guise had been very popular in France, and the citizenry turned against Henry for the murders. The Parlement instituted criminal charges against the king, and he was compelled to join forces with his heir, the Protestant Henry of Navarre, by setting up the Parliament of Tours.

By 1589, Henry's popularity hit a new low. Preachers were calling for his assassination and labelling him a tyrant. The people of Paris disdained him for his court extravagances, allowing corruption to grow rife, high taxes and having relied extensively on Italian financiers. But what most Parisians hated most about him was his alleged sexuality.

=== Overseas relations ===
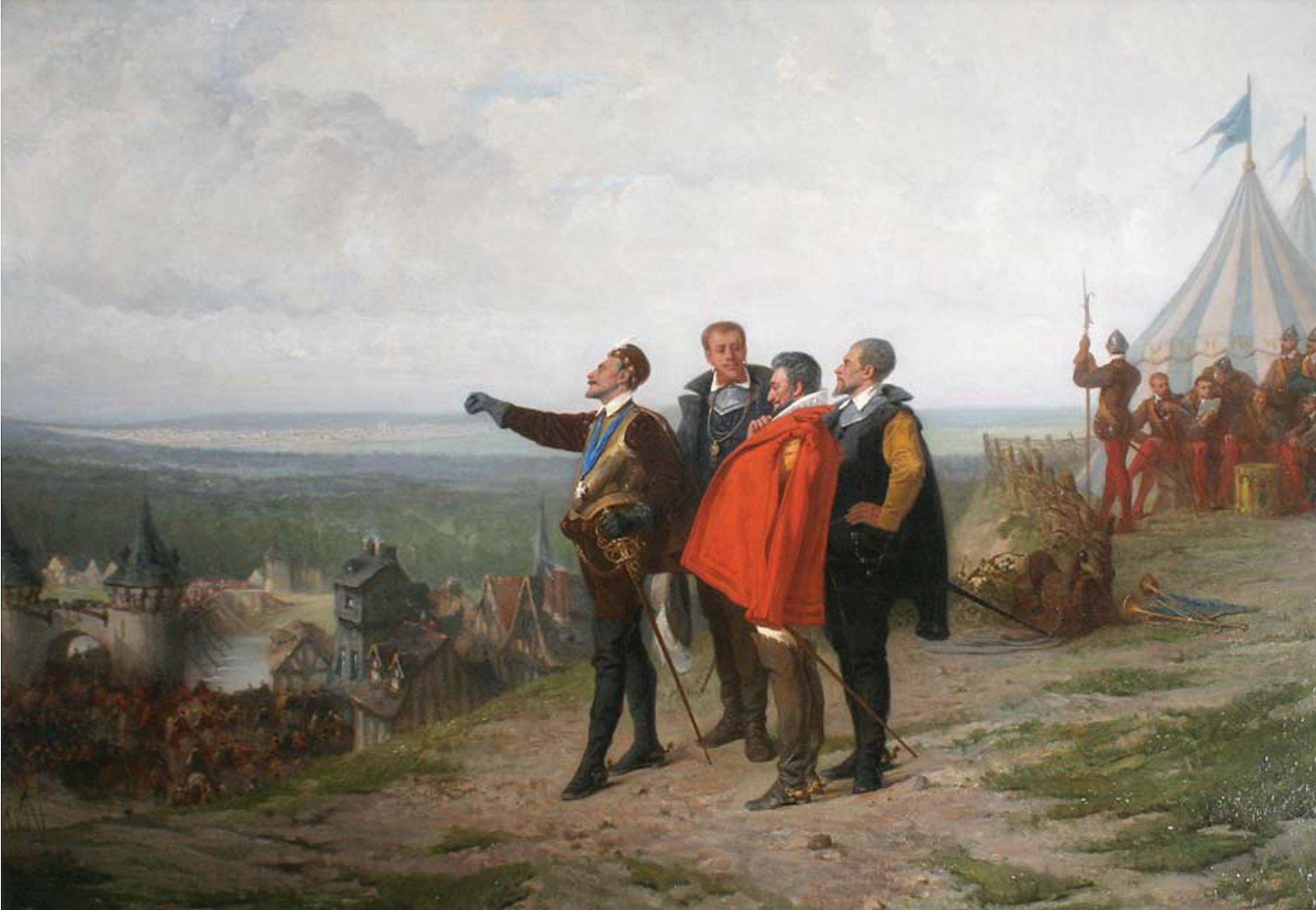
Henry III in preparation to besiege Paris in 1589

Under Henry, France named Guillaume Bérard as the first Consul of France in Morocco. The request came from the Moroccan prince Abd al-Malik, who had been saved by Bérard, a doctor by profession, during an epidemic in Constantinople and wished to retain Bérard in his service.

Henry III encouraged the exploration and development of New World territories. In 1588, he granted Jacques Noël, the nephew of Jacques Cartier, privileges over fishing, fur trading, and mining in New France.

== Assassination ==
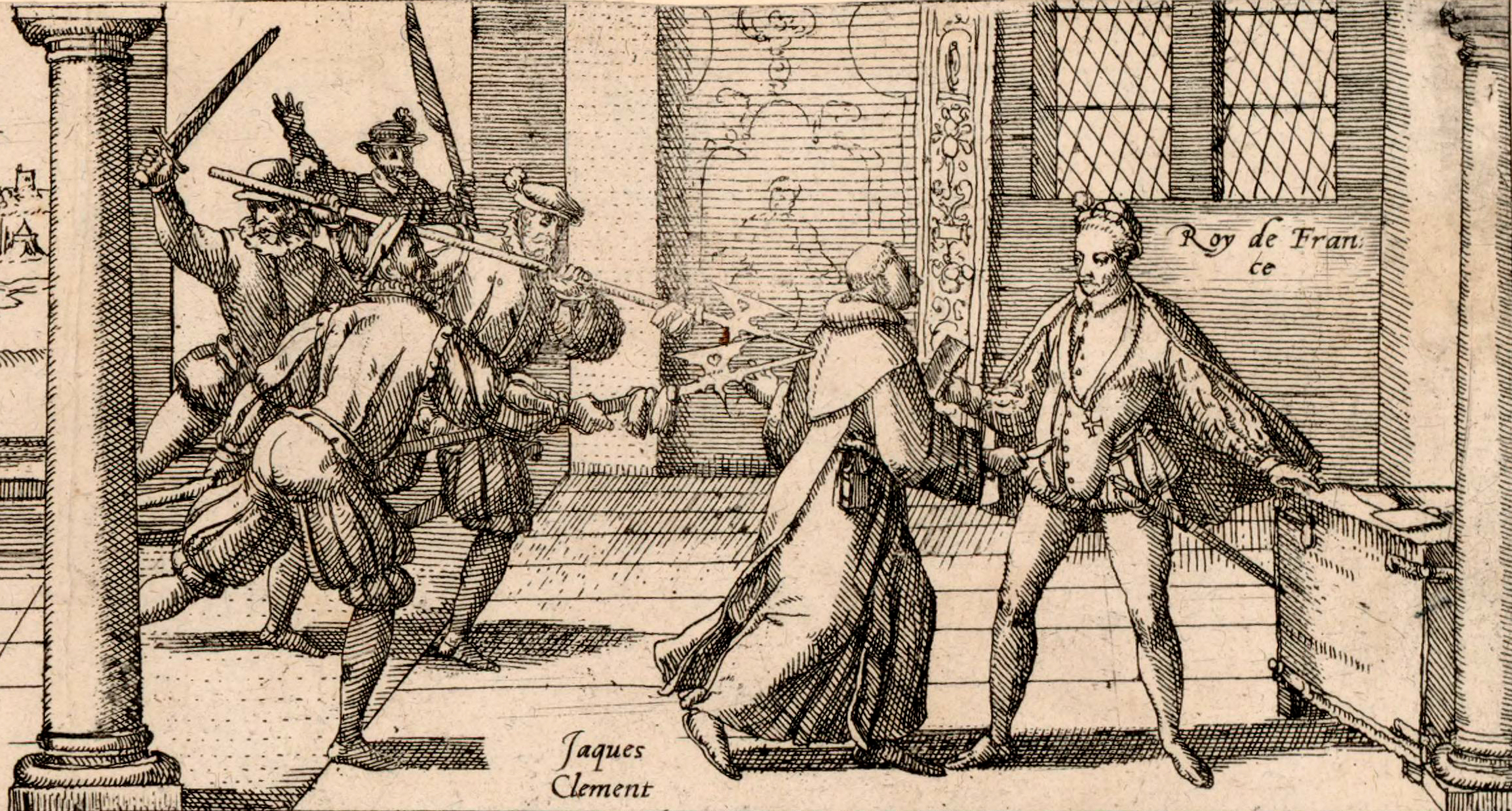
Jacques Clément assassinating Henry III

On 1 August 1589, Henry III lodged with his army at Saint-Cloud, and was preparing to attack Paris, when a young fanatical Dominican friar, Jacques Clément, carrying false papers, was granted access to deliver important documents to the king. The friar gave the king a bundle of papers and stated that he had a secret message to deliver. The king signalled for his attendants to step back for privacy, and Clément whispered in his ear while plunging a knife into his abdomen. Clément was then killed on the spot by the guards.

At first, the king's wound did not appear fatal, but he enjoined all the officers around him, in case he did not survive, to be loyal to Henry of Navarre as their new king. The following morning, on the day that he was to have launched his assault to retake Paris, Henry died.

Chaos swept the attacking army, most of it quickly melting away; the proposed attack on Paris was postponed. Inside the city, joy at the news of Henry III's death was near delirium; some hailed the assassination as an act of God.

Henry III was interred at the Saint Denis Basilica. Childless, he was the longest-living of Henry II's sons to have become king and also the last of the Valois kings. Henry III of Navarre succeeded him as Henry IV, the first of the kings of the House of Bourbon.

== Arms ==
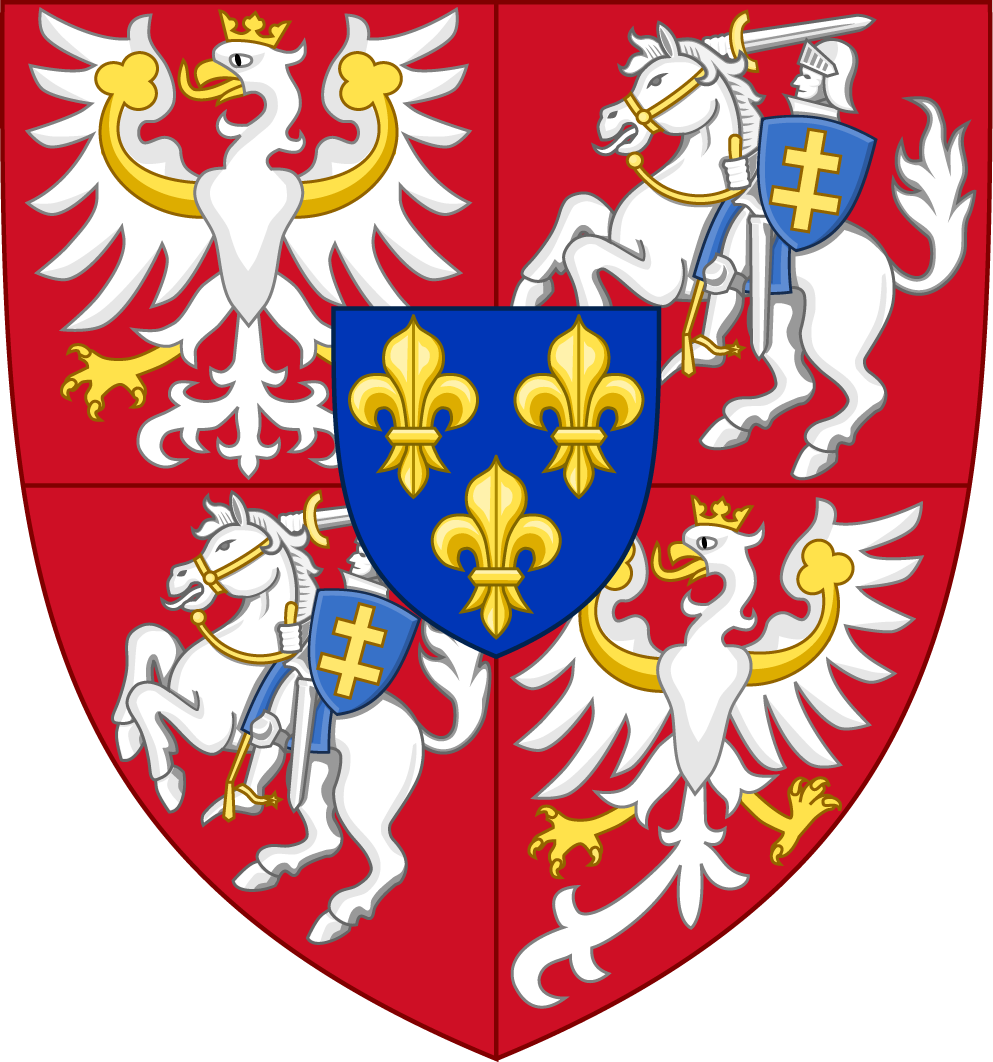
Coat of arms of the Polish-Lithuanian Commonwealth during Henry's reign

Henry's coat of arms, showing his dual status as King of France and lifelong King of Poland

Personal coat of arms

Coats of arms as lifelong king of Poland

== In popular culture ==
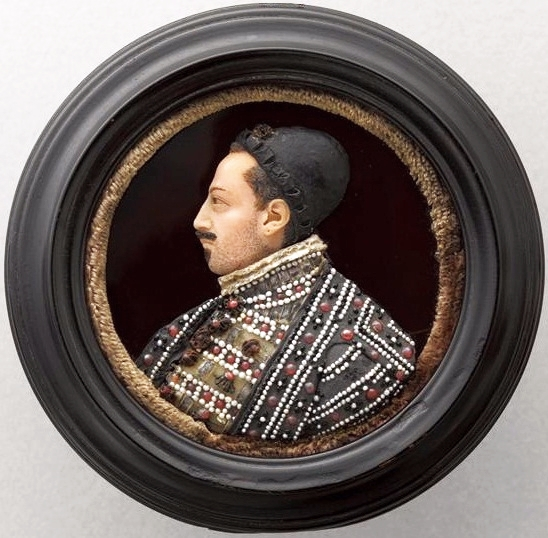
Wax miniature by Antonio Abondio, c. 1590

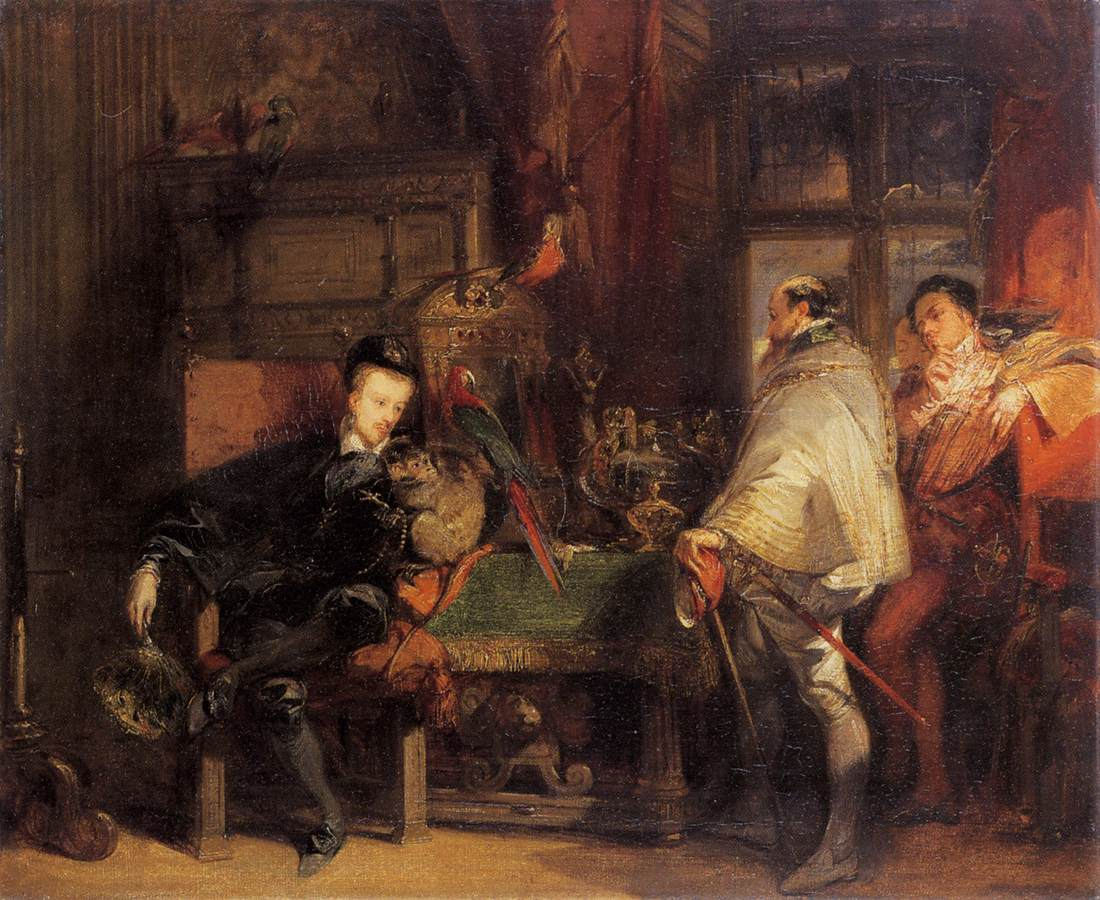
Henri III and the English Ambassador by Richard Parkes Bonington, 1827

=== Poetry ===
- Pierre Matthieu, La Guisiade (1589)
- Jan Kochanowski, Gallo crocitanti (1576)

=== Theatre ===
- Christopher Marlowe, The Massacre at Paris (1593)
- George Chapman, The Tragedy of Bussy D'Ambois (1607) and The Revenge of Bussy D'Ambois (1613)
- John Dryden and Nathaniel Lee, The Duke of Guise (1683)
- Alexandre Dumas, père's Henry III and His Court (1829)

=== Novel ===
- Alexandre Dumas's novels: La Reine Margot (1845), La Dame de Monsoreau (1846) and Les quarante-cinq (1847) as well as Les deux Diane (1846)
- Stanley Weyman, A Gentleman of France (1893), involves the events of Henry's reconciliation with the Huguenots and struggle against the Catholic League, leading to his assassination.
- Michel Zevaco Les Pardaillan (1900)
- Jean Plaidy Queen Jezebel (1953)
- Robert Merle Paris ma bonne ville (1980)
- Robert Merle Le prince que voilà (1982)
- Robert Merle La violente amour (1983)
- S.J. Parris Conspiracy (2015)

=== Film ===
- The French short film The Assassination of the Duke of Guise (1908) shows the Duke's assassination but not the Cardinal's. The co-director, Charles Le Bargy, plays the Duke;
- Last Days of Henry III, King of France at IMDb;
- The American silent film Intolerance (1916) depicts Henry as effeminate but not explicitly homosexual. He is portrayed by the British-born American actor Maxfield Stanley;
- The French movies La Reine Margot (1954) and La Reine Margot (1994), both based on Alexandre Dumas, père's novel of the same title, are fictional depictions of the lives of Henry III's family, his sister Margot, and her Protestant husband Henry around the time of the St. Bartholomew's Day Massacre. In the 1994 film, Henry is played by the actor Pascal Greggory. In Dumas' novel, Henri was not portrayed as homosexual, whereas in the 1954 film, he was shown as an effeminate, comical queen. In the 1994 film, he was portrayed as a more sinister character, bisexual and showing sexual interest in his sister. His brother dies by being accidentally poisoned by his mother, who had intended to kill Henry of Navarre instead;
- As the Duke of Anjou, the future Henry III plays a significant role in the French film The Princess of Montpensier, based on the novel of the same title by Madame de La Fayette;
- The film Elizabeth, released in 1998, depicts a fictional courtship between Elizabeth I of England and Henry III while he was still Duke of Anjou. In reality, the two never met and the Queen of England was actually courted nearly ten years later by his younger brother François, Duke of Anjou, when Elizabeth was 46. The film borrows some of the aspects of Henry III's life and features Anjou as a comical, foolish cross-dresser. The role is portrayed by the French actor Vincent Cassel;
- In the film Dangerous Beauty, he has an assignation with the main character, the Venetian courtesan Veronica Franco. Visiting a Venice eager for military aid, the "French king" chooses her from among the famous courtesans of that city because he notices her reluctance; placing a blade at her neck, he tells Veronica that the "rumours" about him are true (that "the king is a pervert"), and the implication is made that Veronica pleases him enormously by first correctly guessing at and then indulging his fetish for BDSM domination. (When the king emerges from Franco's house in the morning, the assembled Venetian nobility awaits. He smiles broadly while carefully settling his presumably sore posterior on a pillow, and then declares that the French navy shall assist the Venetians against the Ottoman Empire in defence of their rule of Cyprus.) He is played by the British actor Jake Weber.

=== Television ===
- In an episode of Animaniacs entitled "The Three Muska-Warners", an Elmer Fudd–like Henri III is protected by Yakko, Wakko and Dot. In this version, Henri is portrayed by Jeff Bennett as a very old man who acts nervous and jumpy, and for no apparent reason speaks with an English accent;
- He is also featured in a few episodes in the first and fourth seasons of the CW show Reign. In the show's fourth season, Henry is played by Nick Slater. With his brother showing little interest in the job, Spain wants Henry to become France's king;
- The Serpent Queen.

=== Opera ===
- Chabrier's opéra-comique Le roi malgré lui (1887) deals with the unhappy Polish episode, with Henri as the reluctant King of Poland. In Kraków, he conspires with Polish nobles to depose himself. His friend Nangis changes places with him, but in the end, the plot fails and the curtain falls on Henri being crowned.

== See also ==
- Chicot
- History of Poland (1569–1795)
- Les Mignons
- Louis Duret

== Bibliography ==
- Anselme de Sainte-Marie, Père (1726). Histoire généalogique et chronologique de la maison royale de France [Genealogical and chronological history of the royal house of France] (in French). Vol. 1 (3rd ed.). Paris: La compagnie des libraires.
- Carpi, Olivia (2012). Les Guerres de Religion (1559–1598): Un Conflit Franco-Français. Ellipses.
- Carroll, Stuart (2009). Martyrs and Murderers: The Guise Family and the Making of Europe. Oxford University Press. ISBN 978-0-1995-9679-9.
- Chevallier, Pierre (1985). Henri III: Roi Shakespearien. Fayard.
- Crawford, Katherine B., "Love, Sodomy, and Scandal: Controlling the Sexual Reputation of Henry III", Journal of the History of Sexuality, vol. 12 (2003), pp. 513–542
- Crompton, Louis (2003). "Henry III and the Mignons". Homosexuality and Civilization. Cambridge: Harvard University Press. pp. pp. 328–330. ISBN 0-6740-1197-X.
- Davies, Brian L. (2007). Warfare, state and society on the Black Sea steppe, 1500–1700. Routledge.
- George, Hereford Brooke (1875). Genealogical Tables Illustrative of Modern History. Oxford University Press.
- Jones, Colin (2006). Paris: A Biography of a City. Penguin Books.
- Jouanna, Arlette (2021). La France du XVIe Siècle 1483–1598. Presses Universitaires de France.
- Knecht, R. J. (1989). The French Wars of Religion, 1559–1598. Longman.
- Knecht, R. J. (1998). Catherine de' Medici. Pearson Education.
- Knecht, Robert J. (2016). Hero or Tyrant? Henry III, King of France, 1574–89. Routledge.
- Kosior, Katarzyna (2019). Becoming a Queen in Early Modern Europe: East and West. Palgrave Macmillan.
- MacCulloch, Diarmuid (2004). Reformation: Europe's House Divided. Penguin Books.
- Mariéjol, Jean-Hippolyte (1920). Catherine de Médicis: 1519–1589. Librairie Hachette.
- Spangler, Jonathan (2021). Monsieur. Second Sons in the Monarchy of France, 1550–1800. Routledge.
- Stone, Daniel (2001). The Polish-Lithuanian state, 1386–1795. A History of East Central Europe. Vol. IV. Seattle: University of Washington Press. ISBN 0-2959-8093-1.
- Sutherland, Nicola (1973). The Massacre of St Bartholomew and the European Conflict 1559–1572. Macmillan Publishers. ISBN 0-0649-6620-8. OL 5461343M.
- Wellman, Kathleen (2013). Queens and Mistresses of Renaissance France. Yale University Press.

Henry III of France House of Valois, Angoulême branch Cadet branch of the Capetian dynasty Born: 19 September 1551 Died: 2 August 1589
Regnal titles
Vacant Interrex Title last held by Sigismund II Augustus	King of Poland; Grand Duke of Lithuania; 16 May 1573 – 12 May 1575	Vacant Interrex Title next held by Anna of Poland and Stephen Báthory
Preceded by Charles IX of France	King of France; 30 May 1574 – 2 August 1589	Succeeded by Henry IV of France
French royalty
Preceded by Charles II de Valois, Duke of Orléans	Duke of Angoulême; 1551 – 30 May 1574	Succeeded by Diane de France
Preceded by Charles IX of France	Duke of Orléans; 1560 – 30 May 1574	Merged with the Crown
Vacant Title last held by Louise of Savoy	Duke of Anjou; 1566 – 30 May 1574	Succeeded by Francis
