= La Reine Margot (novel) =

1845 novel by Alexandre Dumas

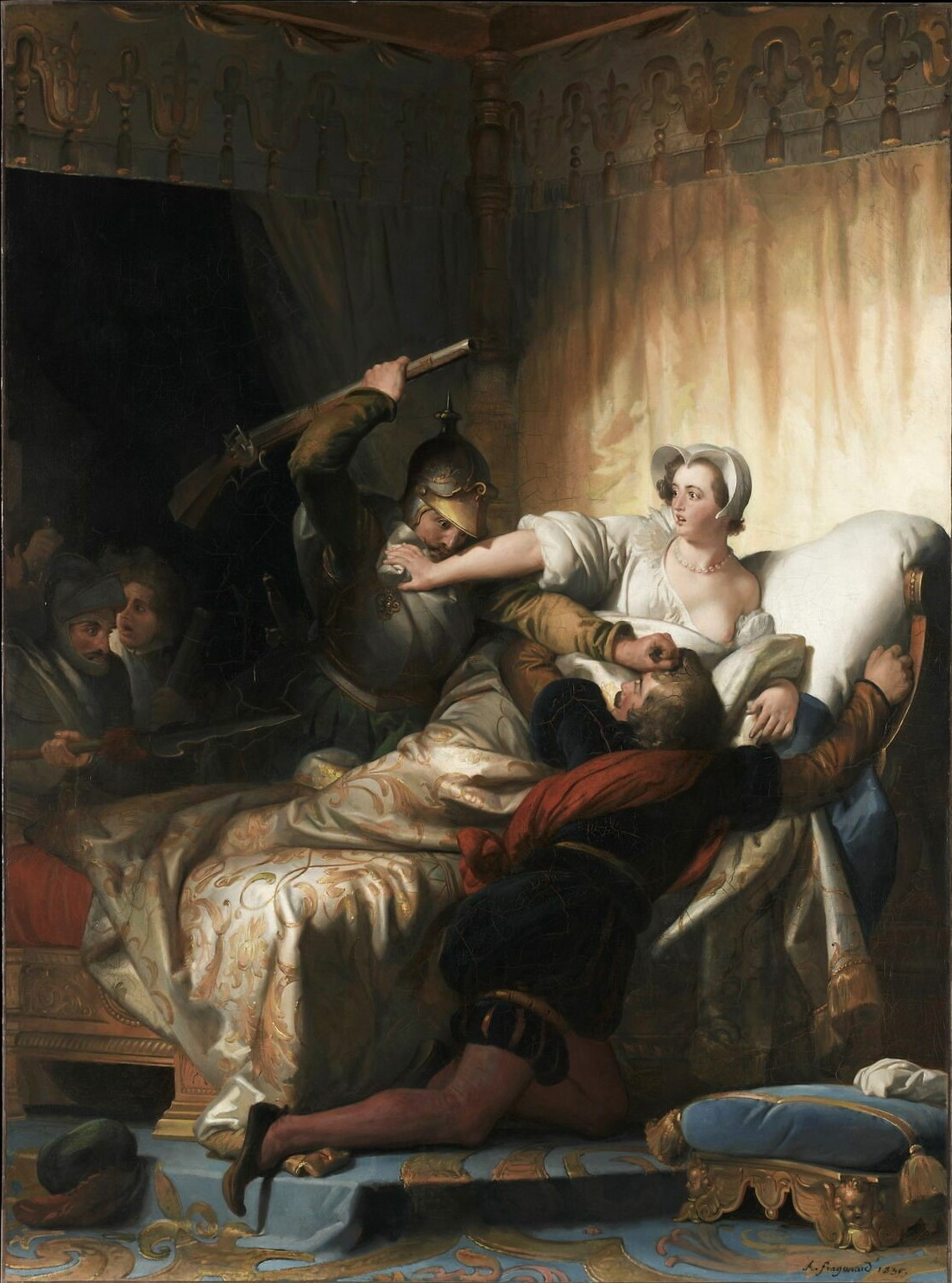
- Cover
- Author: Alexandre Dumas in collaboration with Auguste Maquet
- Original title: La Reine Margot
- Language: French
- Genre: Historical novel
- Publication date: 1844–1845 (serialised)
- Publication place: France
- Followed by: La Dame de Monsoreau

La Reine Margot (French: [la ʁɛn maʁɡo], English: Queen Margot) is a historical novel written in 1845 by Alexandre Dumas. Although it is based on real characters and events, certain aspects of La Reine Margot may be inconsistent with the historical record; historians have attributed that to artistic licence and the fact that Dumas might have been influenced by propaganda against certain historical figures, notably Catherine. Written in French, it was almost immediately translated into English, first anonymously and soon afterward publicly by David Bogue as Marguerite de Valois: An Historical Romance.

== Plot ==
The story begins in Paris in August 1572, during the reign of the Valois King Charles IX, it is the French Wars of Religion. The protagonist is Marguerite de Valois, better known as Margot, the daughter of the deceased Henry II. The antagonist is the scheming Catholic power player Catherine de Medici, Margot's mother.

Although Margot herself is excluded from the throne by the Salic Law, her marriage to a Protestant prince offers a chance for domestic reconciliation during the reign of the neurotic, hypochondriac King Charles IX, while Catholics are vying for political control of France with the French Protestants, the Huguenots.

Catherine decides to make an overture of goodwill by offering up Margot in marriage to prominent Huguenot and King of Navarre, Henri de Bourbon, which is supposed to cement the hard-fought Peace of Saint-Germain. At the same time, Catherine schemes to bring about the notorious St. Bartholomew's Day Massacre of 1572 and assassinate many of the most wealthy and prominent Huguenots, who are in the largely-Catholic city of Paris to escort the Protestant prince to his wedding. The massacre begins four days after the wedding ceremony, and thousands of Protestants are slaughtered. The marriage goes ahead, but Margot, who does not love Henri, begins a passionate affair with the soldier La Môle, also a Protestant from a well-to-do family.

Murders by poisoning follow, as court intrigues multiply and Catherine's villainous plotting to place her son, the future Henry III, on the throne threatens the lives of La Môle, Margot and Henri.

== Adaptations ==
The plot of the novel was fully or partially included in adaptations for film, television and comics, which also drew on the historical facts:

- La Reine Margot, a 1910 French silent film directed by Camille de Morlhon, starting Berthe Bovy
- La Reine Margot a.k.a. A Woman of Evil, a 1954 French-Italian film directed by Jean Dréville, starring Jeanne Moreau
- A mysterious artist named Valentin adapted the novel into a 1972 newspaper comic
- La Reine Margot, a 1994 French-German-Italian film directed by Patrice Chéreau, starring Isabelle Adjani
- Koroleva Margo, a 1996 Russian television series directed by Aleksandr Muratov, starring Yevgenia Dobrovolskaya
