= François de L'Hospital =

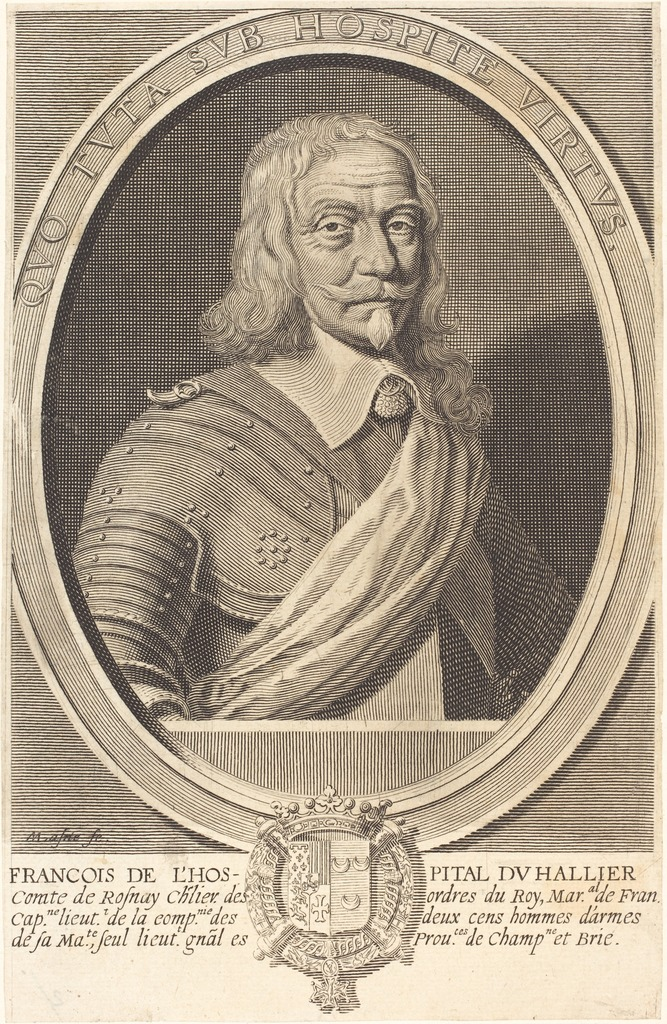
Portrait engraving of François de l'Hospital du Hallier by Michel Lasne.

François de L’Hospital (also de L’Hôpital), (1583 - Paris, 20 April 1660), Seigneur du Hallier and de Beynes (1630), Comte, then Duc de Rosnay (August 1651) and Peer of France was a French military officer and aristocrat of the 16th and 17th centuries. He fought under King Louis XIII in the Thirty Years' War and was appointed Marshal of France in 1643.

== Biography ==
He was the youngest son of Louis de L'Hospital and Françoise de Brichanteau, and the brother of Nicolas de L'Hospital, also a Marshal of France.
Destined for the clergy, he was slated to become abbot of the Abbey of Saint-Germain-des-Prés in Paris and subsequently Bishop of Meaux or Le Mans. However, he declined, preferring a military career.

He joined the Gendarmes de la Garde as an ensign and was promoted to second lieutenant in 1615. In 1617, he transferred to the 2nd Company of the Gardes du Corps du Roi and was awarded the Order of Saint Michael in 1619. Promoted to Maréchal de camp in 1621, he was appointed Governor of the Bastille.

In 1622, he participated in the Sieges of Royan and Montpellier, and in 1628, the Siege of La Rochelle, where he signed the instrument of surrender on behalf of the King. From 1629 to 1633, he accompanied Marshal de Armand Nompar de Caumont on his campaigns in Italy, Lorraine, and Languedoc. During this time, he was appointed Captain-Lieutenant of the Gendarmes de le Garde. He then served in Flanders and in Germany, and in 1637, he was promoted to Lieutenant General. In 1639, he became Governor of Lorraine and continued the campaign at the head of the army. He captured and devastated Falkenberg, but was defeated by Charles IV, Duke of Lorraine at Liffol-le-Grand on 3 September 1642. He was also forced to abandon the siege of the La Mothe Citadel after the King's death in 1643.

On 20 April 1643, he was promoted to Marshal of France. At the Battle of Rocroi in May 1643, he commanded the left wing of the army under Louis II de Bourbon, Prince de Condé. In 1647, he left the Gendarmes de la Garde. In 1649, he became military governor of Paris and retired completely from military service in 1655. That same year, he was appointed Governor-General of Champagne.

He died on 20 April 1660, in Paris.

== Marriages ==
He first married, aged 47, Charlotte des Essarts (1580–1651) on 4 November 1630. She had been the mistress of King Henry IV of France and was the mother of two of his children. She had also five children of Louis III of Guise, a Cardinal.

After her death, he remarried Claudine Françoise Mignot (1624–1711) on 25 August 1653, when he was already 71 years old. She was the widow of Pierre de Portes, and would later marry John II Casimir Vasa.
He had no children from these two marriages.
