= Charlotte des Essarts =

French noblewoman

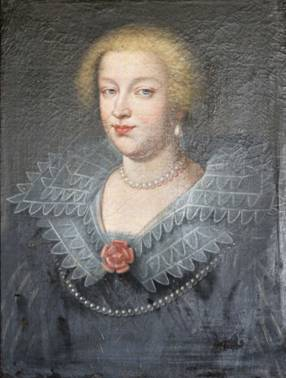
A portrait of Charlotte des Essarts

Charlotte des Essarts (1580–1651), was a French noblewoman. She was the mistress to Henry IV of France in 1607–1609. She had two daughters with the king. She was a lady-in-waiting to the queen, Maria de Medici. She participated in many political plots at court.

== Biography ==
She was the daughter of François de Essarts, seigneur de Sautour, an equerry of the king, and his second wife Charlotte de Harlay de Chanvillon.

Before coming to the French court, Charlotte des Essarts had been a member of the household of the French ambassador in London, Christophe de Harlay, Count of Beaumont and his wife Anne Rabot. She was a relation of Beaumont and also his mistress.

She returned to France with the Ambassador in 1607 and was presented at court in March. King Henry quickly made her his mistress. However, she fell out of favor wit the King, after he learned of her previous affair with the Count of Beaumont. At this time, Charlotte was pregnant with the King's child. The King therefore sent her to Le Tressoir, a country estate near Fontainebleau, to give birth. There she gave birth to her first daughter, Jeanne Baptiste, who was legitimized by the King on 3 March 1608. Henry reconciled with his mistress, and Charlotte gave birth to a second daughter, Marie Henriette, in 1609. After the birth of their second daughter, the King appointed her Countess of Romorantin, but the couple soon quarreled again. Charlotte avoided the inevitable royal disfavor by requesting permission to retire to the Beaumont-lès-Tours Abbey, where she lived until the King's death in May 1610.

In 1611, she married in secret with Louis III, Cardinal of Guise and had 5 children with him. After the Cardinal's death on 21 June 1621, she lived for three years in a relationship with Dominique de Vic, Archbishop of Auch.

In 1630, aged 50, she married François de L'Hôpital (1583-1660), future Marshal of France and Governor of Paris.
After her marriage, she became politically very active. The ambitious woman, together with Charles IV, Duke of Lorraine, participated in an unsuccessful intrigue against Cardinal Richelieu in 1633 and was therefore banished to her husband's estate. She died there on 8 July 1651.
