= Nicolas de L'Hôpital =

French soldier (1581–1644)

Nicolas de L'Hôpital KOHS
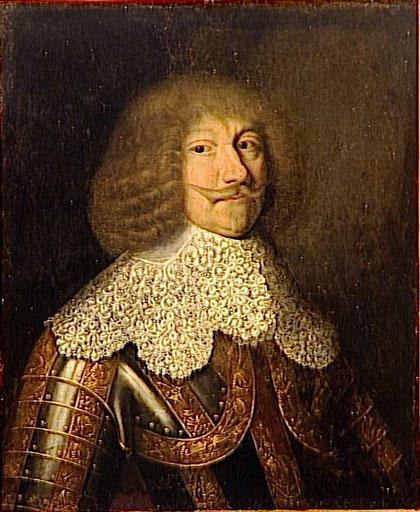
- Born: 1581
- Died: 28 September 1644 (aged 62–63) Nandy, Seine-et-Marne, France
- Allegiance: Kingdom of France
- Branch: (Kingdom of France) French Army
- Rank: Maréchal de France; Captain of the Guard
- Commands: 2nd Company (1st French Company); Garde-du-Corps du Roi
- Awards: Order of the Holy Spirit
- Other work: Governor of Provence

Nicolas de L'Hôpital de Vitry (1581–28 September 1644) was a French noble, military leader, and friend of Louis XIII. Made Marshal of France in 1617, he was often called Maréchal de Vitry. His noble title was marquis (later duc) de Vitry; he was also seigneur de Nandy et de Coubert.

== Early life ==
Nicolas de L'Hôpital de Vitry was the elder son of Louis de L'Hôpital and Franćoise de Brichanteau. His younger brother, François de L'Hôpital, marquis du Hallier, also became a marshal of France.

== Career ==
Like his father and his other ancestors, Vitry joined the army. Due to Henry IV's personal sympathy for Vitry's father, he let Vitry become a companion of the royal heir, the Dauphin (and later king) Louis. He quickly gained the child's favour. After the death of his father in 1611, he succeeded him in his position as captain of the 2nd (and 1st French) company of the Garde du corps du roi, the royal guard.

He played an important role in the assassination of Concino Concini in 1617. It was he who arrested Concini and shot him (with others) afterwards.

After this coup d'etat he was put (along with his brother and Jean-Baptiste d'Ornano) in charge of the armies in the capital, in order to prohibit riots. In the following days, Vitry received Concini's title of marshal and was one of the few persons who had unrestricted entrance to the king's chambers. Later in his life he became also Governor of Provence and Meaux.

In 1635, after decisions he had made in Provence against the will of the king, he was disgraced. In 1637, following an assault on Archbishop Henri de Sourdis, he was imprisoned in the Bastille and only pardoned in 1643.

== Personal life ==
His wife was Lucrèce Bouhier de Beaumarchais, widow of Louis de Trémoille and sister-in-law of Charles de La Vieuville. From her first marriage, she was the mother of Maréchal de camp Louis II de La Trémoille.

Together, they had three children :

- François-Marie (died 1679), French ambassador to Bavaria.
- Nicolas-Louis (1636-1685), French ambassador to Austria and Poland.
- Louise (1627-1661), abbess of the Montivilliers Abbey
