= Joachim de Dinteville =

French noble and lieutenant-general

- sieur de Dinteville
- Image of Dinteville's coat of arms, featuring the collar of Saint-Esprit
- Died: c. 1607
- Noble family: House of Dinteville
- Father: Gaucher II de Dinteville

Joachim de Dinteville ( –1607) was a French noble, lieutenant-general and favourite of Henri III and Henri IV. Born into a prominent Champenois family of the noblesse seconde, Dinteville became close with Anjou (the future Henri III), brother to Charles IX. In 1572 he was elevated to the position of Premier Gentilhomme de la Chambre by the duke, a key role in his household. He travelled with Anjou for the conduct of the siege of La Rochelle in 1573, and fought with him there. Upon Anjou's election as king of the Commonwealth, he travelled east with his lord, and served in his household for his brief tenure as king there. On Anjou's return to take the crown of France, Dinteville departed from his household, assuming responsibilities in Champagne, where he led the Second Estate of Troyes in opposing the attempt of Guise to affiliate the city with the national Catholic ligue. As Henri's brother Alençon moved closer to his plans of assuming the kingship of the rebellious Spanish Netherlands, Dinteville assisted the king in attempting to draw him, and thus France away from a potential confrontation with Spain. He assisted Henri's mother Catherine de Medici in her negotiations with Henri's cousin Navarre in 1579. In December of that year, Henri appointed Dinteville to replace the aged sieur de Barbizieulx as lieutenant-general of Champagne, making him second only to the governor Guise. Henri recognised Dinteville's valuable connections across the noblesse seconde of the province.

Having received reports of ligueur activity in Champagne, Dinteville quickly set to work in combatting potential rebelliousness, overseeing a grand council of the nobility of the region, in which they affirmed their loyalty to the king. During this period he was in tension with Guise, who desired to expand his authority, however the break between the two would not come until after the death of the king's brother in 1584. With Alençon's death, the Protestant Navarre became heir to the throne. Guise took the opportunity to re-found the Catholic ligue and began arming for a confrontation with the crown. On 21 March 1585, Guise occupied Châlons-sur-Marne, beating Dinteville to the city by only a few hours. The two held an interview, after which Dinteville reported to Henri that a 'rubicon had been crossed'. The following day he departed from Châlons, and Guise moved off to occupy Reims. Over the next few months much of the rest of Champagne fell to the ligue, until by June, Dinteville was left with only Troyes, and Langres. Soon thereafter Henri capitulated to the ligueur demands, excluding Navarre from the succession, and granting Guise many 'surety' towns, among them Châlons. Unable to tolerate the increasing ligueur domination of the country, Henri planned a counterstroke through an attempt to introduce troops into the capital. Dinteville assisted him in this plan, commanding a company of Swiss into Paris. The plan backfired, and Dinteville and Henri were forced to flee the city. In the wake of this, Guise's brother Cardinal Guise seized Troyes, and purged its royalist administration.

By December, further insults and slights had once again caused Henri to lose his patience, and he arranged for the assassination of the duke and his brother at Blois in December. Much of France reacted in fury, and defected from the crown. In Champagne, Dinteville attempted to hold the line against the ligue, he was able to secure Châlons for the crown and it became his base of operations for the coming years. While Reims hung in the balance for a month, it eventually sided with the ligueur Sainte-Union. In March he succeeded in reconquering Épernay for Henri. During 1589, he made several unsuccessful attempts to subdue Troyes, which served as the ligueur capital of Champagne. On 1 August, Henri III was assassinated, and Dinteville was among the first to recognise Navarre as Henri IV, the council of Châlons quickly doing likewise. He would achieve little progress against Troyes for several years, until Henri abjured and became Catholic in 1593, receiving the submission of Paris in 1594. Dinteville quickly found his position improving, and in April he received the submission of Troyes, Bar-sur-Aube and Chaumont, entering the former in triumph. After having served Henri for several more years, he died in 1607, and was greatly mourned by the king.

== Early life and family ==
Joachim de Dinteville was the son of Gaucher II de Dinteville, the captain of Bar-sur-Seine. Two of his paternal uncles were bailli of Troyes, a position also held by one of his grandfathers. The Dinteville family were one of the leading members of the Champenois noblesse seconde, and had a particular strength of influence around the city of Langres. This would play a large part in the resistance of the elite of Langres to the Catholic Ligue in the 1580s.

Dinteville secured himself a strong position in Paris for his residence in 1586, on the rue de Béthisy, the same street as many other grandees had occupied such as Admiral Coligny and Chancellor Bellièvre.

== Reign of Charles IX ==
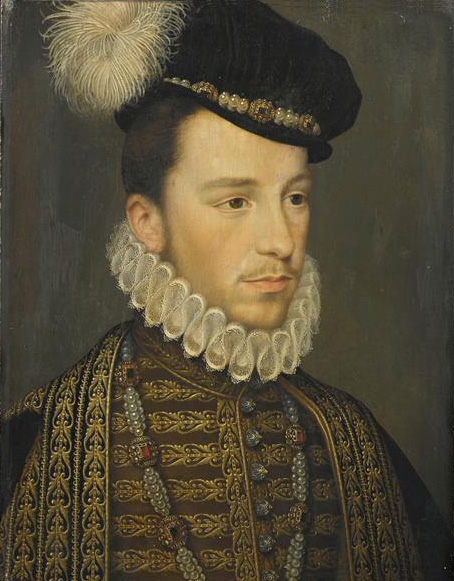
Dinteville's political patron, the duke of Anjou

=== Favourite ===
As early as 1572, Dinetville held the position of premier gentilhomme de la chambre for the duke of Anjou. Despite the theoretical uniqueness of this position, two other men held the office during that year, Louis de Berton-Crillon and Beauvais-Nangis.

=== Commonwealth ===
In the wake of the Massacre of Saint Bartholomew, the Protestant dominated city of La Rochelle, flooded with refugees, entered rebellion against the crown. Charles dispatched his brother Anjou to subdue the city. With Anjou came the cream of the French nobility. Among those in his household who joined him for the conduct of the siege was Dinteville. Having participated in the siege, Dinteville joined his lord when word came that he had been elected king of the Commonwealth in travelling to his new kingdom. Anjou would not stay as king in the Commonwealth for long, and when news of Charles' death reached him he and his entourage, among them Dinteville, fled the country to assume the kingship of France.

== Reign of Henri III ==
He would continue his association with the prince upon his assumption of the crown in 1575. Dinteville remained in his confidence after he took the name Henri III, and was among those the king sent personal correspondence to. Dinteville was of an older generation than many of the other men in Henri's confidence. Though not as close as some of Henri's other favourites he was still considered as a fidèle du roi.

=== First ligue ===
In the wake of the Peace of Monsieur, a Catholic ligue movement began to bloom nationally in opposition to the generous terms, originating in Péronne and spreading out from Picardie. The duke of Guise saw advantage in the movement, and pushed for the towns of his governate to swear to uphold its terms. In March 1577 the three estates of the city convened, under the watchful eye of Guise, who was visiting the city in the hope of influencing it towards adoption. Dinteville led the nobility for the city, and argued that the oath that was requested of them was at best superfluous, and at worst a subversion of the loyalty that truly belonged to Henri. The other two estates similarly rejected adoption of the ligueur terms, and even the compromise 'association' proposed by the ligueurs only garnered signatures from a scattering of Troyes' elite. Much of the urban elite was suspicious the ligue represented a covert way to bring about outside noble control over their city, and that it would be used to extract money from them.

The king's brother Alençon was ambitious, and desired to establish himself as king in the Netherlands. Henri and Catherine opposed a plan that put the kingdom on a collision course with Spain, who maintained their rights as overlords to the region. To this end Dinteville was dispatched with 50 men to track down Alençon in the Netherlands and inform him that the king and his mother were making progress on negotiating a marriage between him and Elizabeth, queen of England. It was hoped the prospect of assuming authority over England would be sufficient to distract him. Dinteville was further instructed to tell the errant prince that he was loved and respected, and that in the wake of Protestant rebellions in France, it was best that he remain close for the stability of the realm.

With civil war again at risk in 1579, Dinteville was involved in negotiations between Catherine de Medici for the crown, and Navarre, cousin to the king and political leader of the Protestants. These negotiations bore fruit in the Treaty of Nérac.

=== Lieutenant-general ===
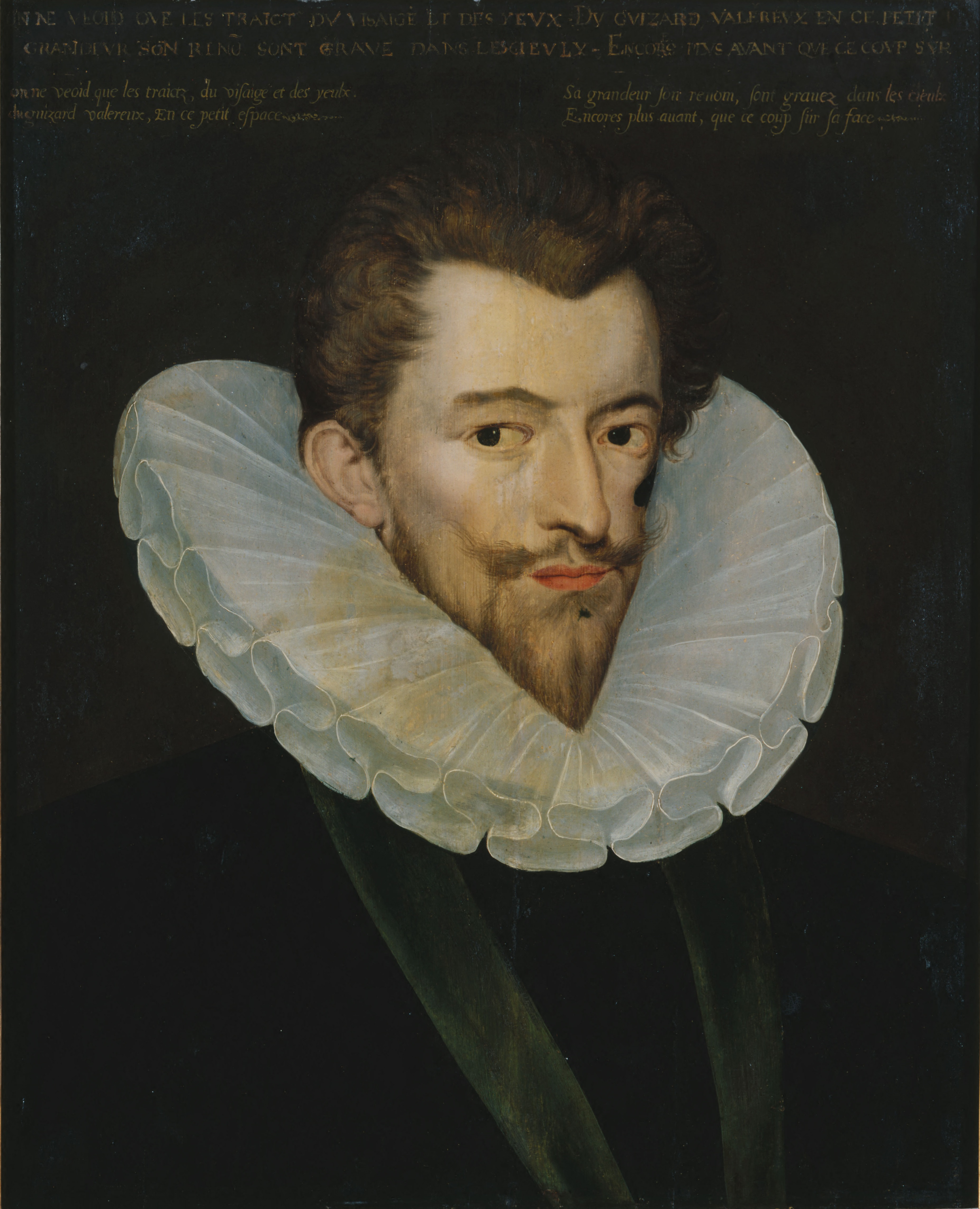
Portrait of the governor of Champagne, the duke of Guise

Champagne was the chief stronghold of the House of Guise in France, with the duke of Guise in place as governor, having succeeded his father, with his influence came the influence of the ligue in Champagne. This troubled Henri, who turned to Dinteville due to his strong connections with the secondary nobility of Champagne. Alongside these links, he also had connections with the leading Protestants of Champagne. On 20 December 1579 Henri appointed him to the position of lieutenant-general of Champagne and Brie, and tasked him with keeping a watch on the duke and ligue. If Guise made moves to expand his authority, turning Champagne into a personal fief, Dinteville was to oppose him. By his appointment, he succeeded the aged the sieur de Barbezieulx who had served as lieutenant general since 1572. At this time he no longer held any position in Henri's household.

Dinteville sent many letters to Henri reporting on the noble feuds that were rife inside the governate of Champagne. In 1580 Dinteville intercepted a copy of the articles for a ligue that had formed in Champagne and, aware that such organisations had been outlawed by the Treaty of Bergerac, sent it onwards to the royal court. He received a sarcastic reply from the royal secretary Brûlart who noted that this ligue was destined to fail, as it made no mention of the king among its grievances. Henri for his part was scandalised by the ligue. He summoned the nobility of the province to meet with him in Chaumont on 2 February of that year. In attendance were 114 nobles, an almost complete who's who of the noblesse seconde of Champagne. Dinteville made his appeal to the assembled figures not on the grounds that he was a royal appointee, and thus must be obeyed, but that as a noble of Champagne he was their natural leader. He reinforced for the nobles the responsibilities of their position as a border province to ensure the kingdoms security. The assembly was a great success and ended with a collective declaration of loyalty to Henri.

By now the civil wars had caused much destruction in communities across Champagne, and ligueurs were not necessarily religious. Dinteville upon interviewing a member of a ligue founded by the governor of Montigny-le-Roi discovered that the main purpose of the organisation was to protect its members against bands of marauding disbanded troops that preyed on the countryside and nobles, holding them for ransom. There were several ligues of this character across Champagne, such was the problem of wandering bands of soldiers.

=== Death of Alençon ===
Though Guise and Dinteville had been to this point in opposition to each other, it did not extend over the regular bounds of jockeying for power that was expected between the king's appointee and a powerful magnate. The two leaders of Champagne for the moment shared many goals, a strong frontier and the removal of the plight of banditry from Champagne. Their relationship would be fundamentally shifted by the death of the king's brother Alençon in mid 1584, and the resulting threat to Guise of a Protestant succession to the crown.

With Guise and his relatives arming themselves and the broader ligue, a confrontation with the crown was looming. Henri was not blind to this. Henri told Dinteville that 'the mask has been virtually cast aside', and that Dinteville must do his utmost to ensure the loyalty of Reims, Sens, Châlons and Troyes. Dinteville took this advice to heart, and pursued regular correspondence with Châlons, all the while Guise was conducting parallel correspondence. Overall the council sympathised with Dinteville, and as they heightened their security, they reported their progress exclusively to him. Dinteville left Troyes to head to Châlons on 20 March 1585, accompanied by a force of roughly fifteen men, arriving the following day. Dinteville was not given a herald upon his entry into the city, the council being occupied elsewhere in the city.

=== War with the ligue ===
On 21 March 1585, the duke of Guise entered Châlons-sur-Marne with a force of 4000 men, thereby opening formal hostilities with the king. He met with Dinteville, who had entered the town via a different gate on the same day, to justify his actions, hoping to avoid a formal break with his provincial colleague. He explained that his rebellion was a matter of self defence. Dinteville wrote to the king the following day, explaining what had transpired in Champagne. He was very troubled as to the royalist prospects, noting that Guise had assembled 4 regiments and had purchased the services of 6000 reiters. He informed the king that it had been necessary for Guise to bring a large force to bear against the town as it would not have submitted peacefully to his wishes. He opined that a 'Rubicon had been crossed', and it would be necessary to combat the prince with force of arms. Though his interview with Guise had been cordial, Dinteville was severely outmatched by the duke in terms of forces, and withdrew from the town the next day. Guise, having assured himself of Châlons, submission to the ligue departed from the city, leaving it under the authority of de Rosne. He travelled next to Épernay, securing it, and with it the approach to Reims. Dinteville for his part offered little resistance to this effort, ceding control of Reims to Guise. He wrote to Henri opining that it was useless to make an attempt to save Reims, and that his efforts were better devoted to Chaumont and Langres. Guise and his brother entered Reims after some trouble with the local council in late March, the Cardinal usurping the local government shortly thereafter.

Dinteville moved to Troyes, establishing the city as his centre of operations for the defence of Champagne. Guise made no direct attempts on the city, either due to evaluating it as lacking importance, or in the hope that it would submit to him through intimidation. Dinteville moved to regularise and intensify the security of Troyes, issuing a set of 55 regulations in 1585 concerning the organisation of its militia. He wrote to the king on the importance of investing in the cities fortifications, arguing that a recent financial levy on the city would be better spent improving its walls. As the conflict continued, Dinteville and Guise competed for influence in Troyes. The ligue sought to bring the artisans of the city over to their cause. They were not overly successful in this effort, and Dinteville had success in convincing much of the nobility against affiliating with the ligue as a subversion of loyalty to Henri. The bailli Vaudrey did align himself with Guise and the ligue however. The council of the city took a middle line, rebuffing both Dinteville's attempt to garrison the city with his troops, many of whom were Protestant, and Vaudrey's attempt to seize the watchtower during one of Dinteville's absences.

In his correspondence with Henri, Dinteville indicated that he had been assured of Chaumonts loyalty to the crown by the local council, however by this time he was under an incorrect impression, Chaumont having affiliated with the ligue as early as 15 March when the council sent representatives to Joinville, Haute-Marne.

In a desperate hope to maintain some grip on the Seine, Dinteville inaugurated guards composed of 50-60 men apiece at Nogent, Méry and Montereau. He recruited heavily from the Protestant nobility to bolster his numbers, gaining the support of Bettancourt and the marquis de Reynel. This recruitment was not without its risks, as it had the potential to alienate the royalist Catholics in Troyes, but Dinteville understood the vulnerability of his position in the province.

In June of that year, Guise left Champagne to campaign outside the province against the king. In his absence he appointed de Rosne to govern the territory, effectively making de Rosne his replacement for Dinteville in the province. Dinteville was by this point largely restricted to Troyes by the ligueur coups across the province. The situation was increasingly untenable for the crown as Guise assembled an army of over 25,000 men. The following month the ligue triumphed in the Treaty of Nemours a term of which granted Châlons to Guise as a surety town. The city would remain under his occupation until his death in 1588.

=== War with the Protestants ===
The Protestant markgraf von Dohna invaded France in Autumn 1587 with an army of reiters in support of Navarre. Guise sprung into action, mobilising defences around Bar-sur-Aube, while in September Dohna laid siege to Clairvaux. Dinteville operated nearby in Langres, receiving warnings from the king that Guise's mobilisation against the mercenaries might be turned on the royalist city. Henri counselled the mayor of Langres, Jean Roussat that he was to repulse Guise with force if he made an attempt on the city. Guise meanwhile bested Dohna at Auneau before bringing his troops close to Langres. Suspicious, the Langres council asked Guise to enter with only a small retinue, outraging the duke. Having calmed down Guise entered Langres, where he was met by Dinteville. Having stayed for a short while, unsuccessful in any attempt to persuade the city to join the ligue he departed, only to be followed by his brother who unsuccessfully tried to bribe the mayor of the city.

=== Day of the Barricades ===
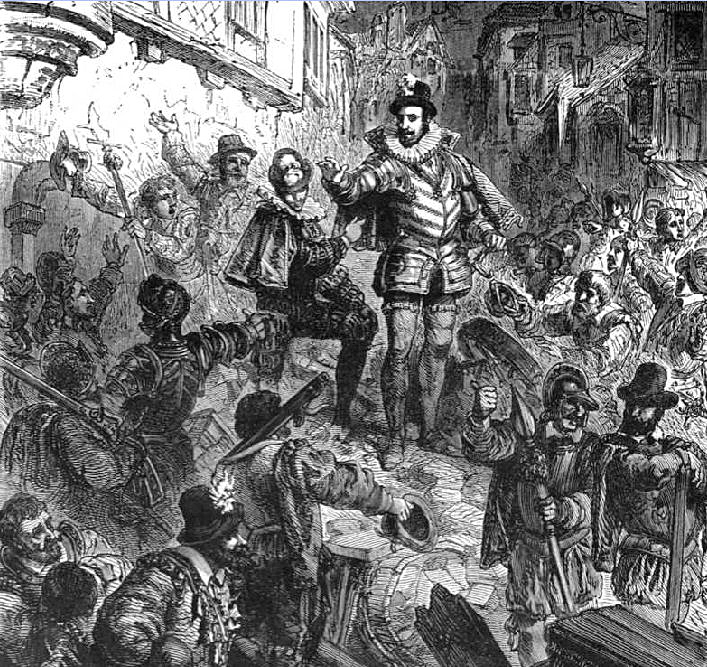
The Duke of Guise takes control during the Day of the Barricades

Henri was increasingly ready to throw down the gauntlet to the ligue by May 1588, and he saw Paris as the ideal venue for that showdown. A plan was formed between Henri and a small council of advisers, among them the governor of Paris, D'O; the governor of Narbonne, Rieux; Beauvais-Nagis and Dinteville. The group met on the evening of 11 May and following D'O's lead, agreed to introduce a large body of troops to the capital, to intimidate the ligueurs in the city. Dinteville was given command of the troops that gathered at the cemetery of Saint-Jean. The plan would backfire, the city taking up arms and menacing the troops. Dinteville was dispatched by the king to liaise with the insurgents, in a vain attempt to convince them that Henri's intentions with the introduction of troops to the capital were honourable, and that there was no cause to take arms. The Swiss under Dintevilles' command were saved from massacre only through the intervention of Guise. This failed and Henri and his supporters were forced to flee the city.

The ligue quickly converted this coup in Paris to further advance inside the governate of Champagne. Ligueur representatives travelled to Troyes, denouncing Dinteville and his supporters in the city. Guise wrote that Dinteville was not to be allowed entry, highlighting his role as commander of the Swiss in Paris. Henri was aware of these efforts and sent word that Guisard ligueurs were not to be permitted entry. Guise's brother Cardinal Guise who had arrived in early June outside the city, was therefore denied entry. By subterfuge he gained access on 10 June and soon effected a coup.

Concurrently Dinteville and Guise were sending letters to Chaumont to secure its loyalty. Chaumont sent a delegation of two notables to Dinteville to assure them of their loyalty to the crown and reassure him that he did not need to come to the city, however at the same time they dispatched several delegates to Troyes, where they agreed to affiliate Chaumont with the ligue. Their dispatches to Dinteville proved to be a delaying tactic to buy time as they sought to affiliate with the Sainte Union of the ligue.

=== Assassination of the duke of Guise ===
Shortly after the assassination of the duke of Guise on 23 December 1588, Henri was faced with a kingdom in revolt. Mayenne was proclaimed by the ligue as the lieutenant-general of the kingdom. Henri was meanwhile faced with a decision as to who to replace Guise with as governor of Champagne. He offered the role to Nevers, who accepted it on the condition it formally be granted to his son. Dinteville was to remain as lieutenant general, though with Nevers a far more absentee governor than Guise had been, Dinteville enjoyed the full authority of governor. Conscious that Dinteville was a staunch opponent of the ligue in Champagne, Mayenne counter appointed de Rosne and Antoine de Saint Paul as joint lieutenant-generals of Champagne, under the authority of the captive young duke of Guise as governor.

Dinteville seized the opportunity of his freedom from Guise with speed, appointing a new royalist governor for Châlons on the first day of 1589. The royalist council of Châlons was opposed by the cities bishop, but he was unable to mobilise ligueur opinion in the city in an effective manner. In February Dinteville and the council devised a plan to trick the bishop into leaving the city so they could lock him outside the walls, succeeding much to the man's consternation. He remonstrated against the council to be allowed to return, but was refused.

=== Second war with the ligue ===
On 3 January 1589 Dinteville wrote to Châlons, outlining his plan to collaborate with exiles from Troyes to seize the city back for the crown. He was optimistic, not yet believing the city to be a lost cause, despite Guise's coup of the previous year. The ligueurs in Troyes were not blind to his machinations, and the procureur de siège présidial was arrested shortly after, his correspondence with Dinteville having been uncovered. After a short trial, denounced by royalists as a sham, he was hanged on 16 January. On that same day, the council of Châlons wrote to Dinteville requesting he provide royal artillery that could be mounted on the walls of the city to defend them from any ligueur aggression. The following month he collaborated with the town in convincing a prominent ligueur, Clause, who was pushing for the city to join the ligue to depart from the city. He wrote complaints to the council but they ignored his requests to return while Dinteville and the council made further regulations to prevent sedition inside the walls.

During January Reims hung in the balance, caught between royalist and ligueur factions in its walls. Dinteville sent an agent from Châlons to sound out the mood of the city, the council reported to him that they were faithful subjects of Henri, as he had sworn to uphold the Edict of Union. On 15 January Dinteville sent a letter, indicating that he intended to visit the city, to give them the king's reply to these assurances. The royalists and undecided council members were horrified, fearful of how the ligueurs in the city would react to such a polarising presence, and wrote back to try and dissuade him. Several royalists wrote to the king, asking for a governor who was a royalist, but one that could plausibly be presented as a neutral figure. Henri selected the duke of Piney, a non ligueur relation of the Guise family. This pick did not prove conciliatory enough, and the majority of the council reacted with horror. By February Reims had declared for the ligue.

When Nevers got news of the king's decision to seek an accord with his Protestant heir Navarre, he was bitterly disappointed, having hoped that the kingdom could be reunited behind the king through a war on heresy. Making his opposition known, he was forced into semi-disgrace, retiring to his estates and Henri satisfied himself that Dinteville would lead the resistance in Champagne to the ligue. Dinteville was proving his worth to Henri in Champagne, sending a militia force out from Châlons that reduced Épernay after a brief bombardment on 30 March. The ligueur government of the city had attempted to reach out to Reims for assistance, but reinforcements were unable to arrive in time. Saint-Etienne, who the ligue had expelled from the city in January was reinstalled with companies of Protestant and Catholic troops under his command.

He faced off against the main ligueur commander in the province, Saint Paul throughout these months, neither able to strike a decisive blow against the other. Henri for his part dispatched the comte de Grandpré with further forces to support Dinteville.

In June Dinteville made his attempt on Troyes. His attempt was however rapidly defeated. The ligue in the city decided not to take any further chances, all non residents of the city were expelled, searches were undertaken and wealthy prisoners had their property sold to fund the resistance to the lieutenant-general.

During July the council of Châlons became increasingly jumpy as word arrived that Mayenne had entered Reims, and they urgently requested Dinteville's presence. Dinteville responded that he had been tasked by Henri with escorting some Swiss mercenaries, and that after rendezvousing with the king he would expend every effort to support Châlons.

== Reign of Henri IV ==
=== Assassination of Henri III ===
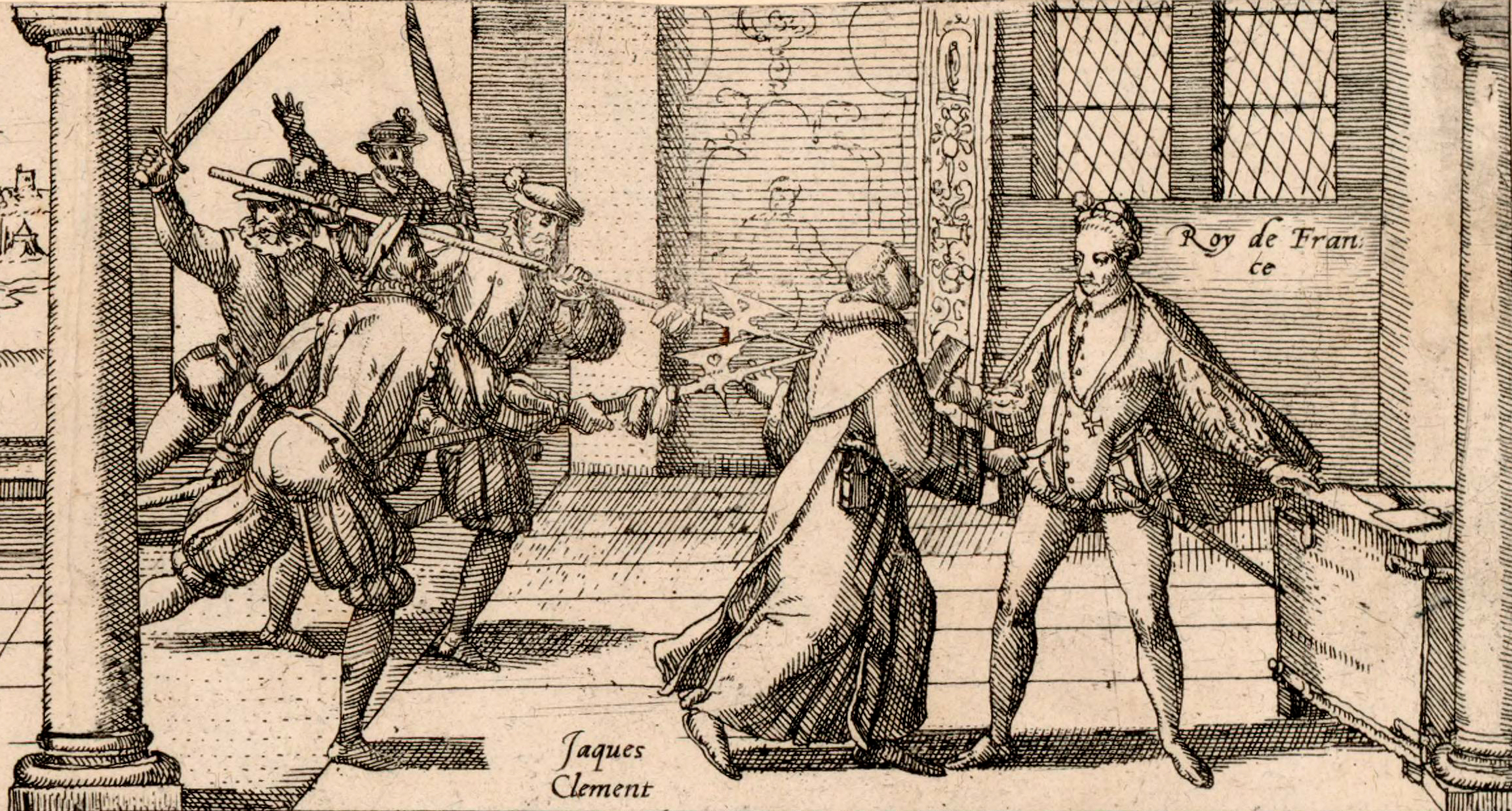
Henri III is assassinated by the Dominican friar Jacques Clément

On 1 August, Henri was assassinated by Jacques Clément, a radical friar inspired by the murderous rhetoric in the capital. Those who had remained loyal to him were now faced with the prospect of serving a Protestant king. Navarre, now styling himself Henri IV recognised the sensitivity of the situation. On 4 August he issued a declaration in which he announced that he was a father to all his people, that he would protect the Catholic faith, and that he would receive instruction in its rites within six months. This was enough for many of Henri's loyalists, among them Dinteville, who transferred their allegiance across to the new king. As early as 6 August he wrote a letter to the council of Châlons in which he informed them of Henri's death and how all the princes and officers had sworn themselves to Henri IV's service. Châlons hastily wrote back that they would loyally serve the new king, even saying that they had reached this decision before receiving Henri's assurances to protect the Catholic religion. Dinteville was a signatory to a letter to the grand duke of Toscana explaining the decision of the Catholic magnates to support Henri. They explained that they had faithfully served the final Valois king while he lived as an alternative to Navarre, however now with his death it was necessary to secure the stability of the state, and Henri had promised to protect the Catholic faith.

Not yet willing to abandon his efforts against Troyes, Dinteville made another attempt on the important ligue stronghold on 17 September 1590. This time he had more soldiers at his disposal under the authority of Eustache de Mesgrigny. Ladders were placed to scale the walls with the involvement of the governor of Châlons and exiled officials from Troyes. After a bloody fight, hotly resisted by 2000 citizens inside the city, Dinteville's assault was beaten back. One hundred of his soldiers were killed, and inside the city the gaoler opened the prison doors, and allowed a mob to murder all the royalists inside.

While Châlons' council was committed to the royalist cause, elements of the population desired to deliver the city to the ligue, among them Jacques de Berlize and Jehan Legros. Having caught wind of the plot Dinteville hurried to Châlons to ensure it was successfully crushed. The primary leaders were sentenced by the Parlement to be drawn and quartered.

=== Catholic king ===
After Henri abjured to Catholicism, and was recognised as king by the Paris Parlement resolve began to collapse among the ligueur towns. Keen to shore up their base, Guise travelled to Troyes in February and renewed the oath to the ligue, his brother Joinville symbolically burned a pile of correspondence sent to the city from royalist held Châlons. When Joinville attempted to prevent the inhabitants negotiating with Henri he was chased out of the city, which recognised Henri on 4 April 1594. On 5 April 1594 Dinteville entered Troyes in triumph, and oversaw a Te Deum in celebration for its return to loyalty. In May a royal official was sent to the city to restore royalists to office and ensure unrepentant ligueurs were removed from the administration. Together with Dinteville he oversaw the provision of oaths of loyalty from the citizens. The final act of ligueur resistance was to post some libels on Dinteville's residence in the city in early August.

From the newly recaptured Troyes, Dinteville was faced with the quick submission of Chaumont. He wrote out to Bar-sur-Aube on 7 April, calling for the towns submission, which it delivered to him on 12 April with a unanimous declaration of loyalty to Henri in a general assembly.

=== Death ===
Upon his death in 1607, Henri mourned his passing. He remarked to Sully, his Surintendant des finances 'Poor M. Dinteville is dead, it is a great pity.'

== Sources ==
- Carroll, Stuart (2011). Martyrs and Murderers: The Guise Family and the Making of Europe. Oxford University Press.
- Chevallier, Pierre (1985). Henri III: Roi Shakespearien. Fayard.
- Harding, Robert (1978). Anatomy of a Power Elite: the Provincial Governors in Early Modern France. Yale University Press.
- Holt, Mack (2002). The Duke of Anjou and the Politique Struggle During the Wars of Religion. Cambridge University Press.
- Jouanna, Arlette (1998). Histoire et Dictionnaire des Guerres de Religion. Bouquins.
- Knecht, Robert (2016). Hero or Tyrant? Henry III, King of France, 1574-1589. Routledge.
- Konnert, Mark (1997). Civic Agendas & Religious Passion: Châlon-sur-Marne during the French Wars of Religion 1560-1594. Sixteenth Century Journal Publishers Inc.
- Konnert, Mark (2006). Local Politics in the French Wars of Religion: The Towns of Champagne, the Duc de Guise and the Catholic League 1560-1595. Ashgate.
- Roberts, Penny (1996). A City in Conflict: Troyes during the French Wars of Religion. Manchester University Press.
- Le Roux, Nicolas (2000). La Faveur du Roi: Mignons et Courtisans au Temps des Derniers Valois. Champ Vallon.
- Le Roux, Nicolas (2006). Un Régicide au nom de Dieu: L'Assassinat d'Henri III. Gallimard.
