= Louis de L'Hôpital =

Late Sixteenth-Century French governor

- marquis de Vitry
- Born: 1555; Kingdom of France
- Died: 1611 (aged 55–56)
- Family: Famille de L'Hôpital
- Spouse: Françoise de Brichenteau
- Issue: Nicolas de L'Hôpital (1581-1644); François de l'Hôpital (1583-1660)
- Father: François de l'Hôpital, marquis of Vitry
- Mother: Anne de La Châtre

Louis de L'Hôpital, marquis de Vitry (1555 – 1611) was a French noble, governor, military commander and rebel during the latter French Wars of Religion. The son of François de l'Hôpital and Anne de La Châtre, Vitry found himself drawn into the opposition to the king in the early 1580s affiliating with the king's brother Alençon. In this capacity he served under the command of his maternal uncle Claude de La Châtre In 1584 the king successfully detached him, and made Vitry into a royal favourite, granting him the honour of being made a chevalier de l'Ordre de Saint-Michel, before appointing him the governor of Dourdan and lieutenant of the royal hunt.

In 1589, Henri entered war with the Catholic ligue, Vitry was loyal to Henri and fought for the king at the head of a company in the Brie. When the king was assassinated, and his Protestant heir Henri IV succeeded him, Vitry was the highest profile noble to defect to the ligueur cause. He joined his uncle, La Châtre, an earlier ligueur convert at Bourges, serving as the leader of his cavalry against the royalists and as governor of the city when La Châtre was absent. During Henri's siege of Paris, Vitry participated in the ligueur defence. As reward for his service, the lieutenant-general of the ligue, Mayenne made him maître de camp of the ligueur light cavalry, and governor of Meaux. In 1593, Henri would convert to Catholicism, and Vitry began to look for an exit ramp from his support of the ligue. In December he entered negotiations with the king, and the city was handed over to the royalists on 4 January 1594, much to Mayenne's fury. As a reward for the defection, Vitry's debts were cleared, and he was confirmed as governor of Meaux with survivance for his son. Vitry played a role in the royalist capture of Paris in March 1594, leading a column of troops into the city ahead of the king. As early as 1602 he was serving as the captain of the king's bodyguard, and on the day when Henri was assassinated, Vitry had warned him of the risks of going into the city without him, only to be dismissed. He died the following year.

== Early life and family ==
Louis de l'Hôpital was born in 1555, the son of François de l'Hôpital, marquis of Vitry (died 1569) and Anne de La Châtre. Vitry's maternal uncle, Claude de La Châtre, was the ligueur governor of Berry.

In August 1580, Vitry married Françoise de Brichenteau, the younger sister of the royal favourite Beauvais-Nangis.

== Reign of Henri III ==
In 1580 the king granted him a gift of 1000 écus.

=== Alençon ===
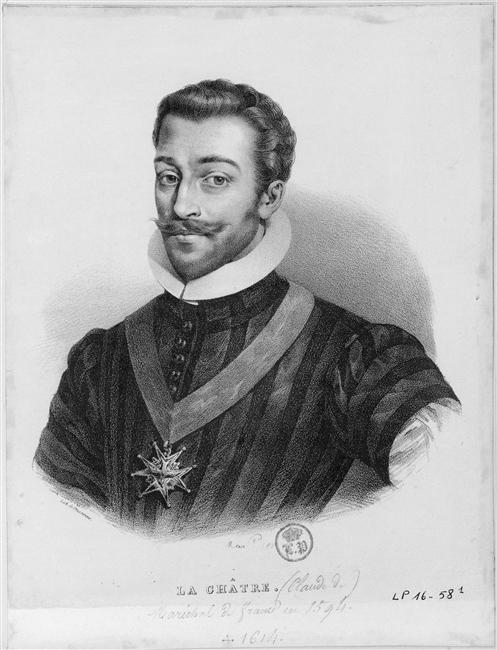
Claude de La Châtre, uncle of Vitry

After his disgrace in 1581, Beauvais-Nangis sought the friendship of his brothers in law; Vitry and Claude de Bauffremont. Many nobles who were in opposition to the king aligned themselves with his brother Alençon. Vitry was among these nobles during the early 1580s, and served in the dukes household as a gentilhomme de la chambre. Vitry distinguished himself as a soldier under the command of his uncle La Châtre.

=== Favourite ===
His allegiance to the prince was to be temporary however, Henri keen to win him over. In 1584 he was made a chevalier de l'Ordre de Saint-Michel, the second highest order of French chivalry. This was followed by elevation as a gentilhomme de la chambre du roi the following year. In the final years of Henri's reign he would become lieutenant of the royal hunt and governor of the town and citadel of Dourdan.

In 1584, Henri's brother Alençon died. Given Henri had no children with his wife, this meant that succession defaulted on his distant cousin the Protestant king of Navarre. For many Catholic notables this was unacceptable, and under the direction of the duke of Guise and Lorraine family they formed a Catholic ligue to oppose the succession, and various other royal policies. In March 1585 this ligue made war on Henri and forced him to void Navarre's right to the succession and make war on Protestantism. Over the next few years Henri's relations with his nominal ligueur allies against Protestantism would deteriorate.

=== Loyalist ===
With the king at war with the ligue in 1589 after assassinating the duke of Guise, Vitry rallied to him. He raised a company of light cavalry in the Brie and faced off against the ligueurs of the area.

== Reign of Henri IV ==
=== Ligueur ===
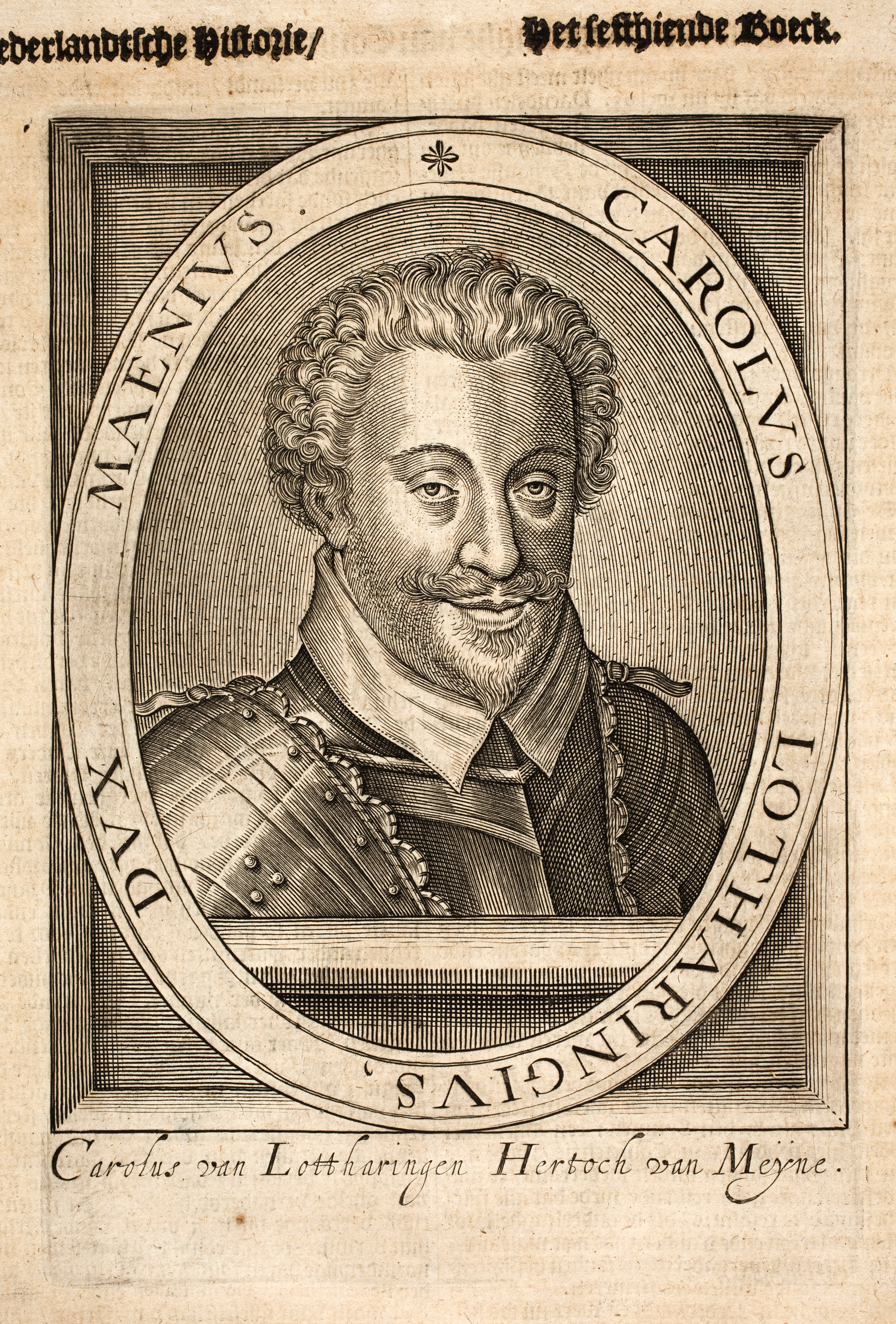
Charles de Lorraine, duc de Mayenne the lieutenant-general of the Catholic ligue

The ligue recognised the murder of Henri III on 2 August as a great opportunity, with many loyal lords now faced with the immediate prospect of having to serve a Protestant king in the form of Navarre, now styled Henri IV. To this end they sent out appeals urging defections from Catholic royalists. Vitry was the first great noble to heed this call and on 12 August promised to deliver the town of Dourdan of which he was governor to the late duke of Guise's mother duchesse de Nemours. On 17 August he advanced 600 écus to the lieutenant general of the ligue the duke of Mayenne's army. Overall however, most nobles of stature who were sympathetic to the ligue had already declared for the ligue prior to the death of Henri, therefore Vitry was largely an exception in his late defection.

At the head of a cavalry force, he put himself at the service of his ligueur uncle La Châtre, forming the basis of the military of his little fiefdom carved out around Bourges. When La Châtre was absent from Bourges he entrusted Vitry as governor of the city in his stead.

Vitry participated in the defence of ligueur held Paris against an attempted siege by Henri IV in early 1590. As a reward for his service, Mayenne appointed him the ligueur governor of Meaux. He was further established as maître de camp for the ligueur light cavalry.

Mayenne and the radical ligue leadership of Paris, known as the Seize were increasingly alienated from one another. The Seize were frustrated by Mayenne's cautious conservativism and decided to strike out in November 1591 against those they perceived to be royalists, killing the premier président of the Parlement Barnabe Brisson. Mayenne was outraged, and decided it was time to liquidate the radical leadership of his movement. On 4 December Vitry, on his orders rounded up several leading members of the Parisian Seize, Auroux, Émonnot, Ameline and Louchard and put them under arrest. Shortly thereafter, they were hanged outside the Louvre.

=== Meaux ===
In December 1593, after Henri's conversion to Catholicism, his victory became increasingly inevitable and a wave of defections to the royalist camp followed. The municipal leadership of Meaux were keen to defect to the royal cause, and Vitry followed their lead, offering his capitulation to Henri.

The city opened its gates to Henri on 4 January 1594. The principal inhabitants of Meaux travelled to the king to make official Vitry's surrender. Upon entering his presence they were overcome, and prostrated themselves. Henri wept and informed them, they were not his enemies but subjects, and that he would embrace them as a father does their children. The city of Meaux secured itself generous terms from Henri. Henri promised to protect the Catholic institutions of Meaux, promised he would not allow Protestant worship within its walls, confirmed all the ligueur officers in their posts, waived back taxes and exempted Meaux from the taille for the next 9 years.

When Mayenne received news of Meaux's defection in Paris, he was furious. It was reported that he tore the letter delivering the news to him apart with his teeth.

For Henri the defection of Meaux was a key stepping point to Paris, and he highlighted his generous treatment of the city in the letters he had smuggled into the capital. Vitry for his part used the surrender as an opportunity to publish a manifesto (Le Manifeste à la noblesse de France) in which he elaborated that he had only rebelled due to Henri being a Protestant, and now that he was Catholic there was no cause to defy him. Vitry was richly rewarded for his defection, receiving confirmation of his ligueur granted post as governor of the city, with a promise that his son could succeed him in the role. He received further appointment as governor of his seigneurie Vitry-Coubert in Brie. He was further granted 108,000 livres to clear his debts.

Vitry's defection came only days before his uncle La Châtre wrote to Mayenne informing him that it was not imperative to negotiate with Henri. La Châtre would submit to Henri with Orléans on 17 February 1594, his justification for abandoning the ligue would be the same as Vitry's, Henri was a Catholic therefore there was no reason to rebel against him.

=== Paris ===
With the betrayal of the ligueur held Paris into royalist hands agreed in negotiations between the governor of the city the duke of Brissac and the royalist François d'Espinay who had a family relation to Brissac, Vitry had a role to play in the capitulation of the city. With Saint-Luc having come to the city, Vitry ensured that Langlois opened the gate to the royalists. Vitry's column of troops was delayed and Langlois had twice previously opened the gates to greet him before he arrived. Alongside Saint-Luc and D'O he then led the royal troops into the city up the rue Saint-Denis. Shortly thereafter Henri would enter Paris in triumph, no battle for the city having been necessary outside of a brief skirmish around the Louvre.

=== Biron ===
A conspiracy against Henri was uncovered in 1602, led by the duc de Biron and the comte d'Auvergne. Henri summoned Biron to his residence, but Biron refused to admit his involvement in talks with the king. Around midnight on 16 June he again summoned Biron, and Vitry in his capacity as captain of the guard arrested Biron and took him to the Bastille, where he would be executed.

=== Regicide ===
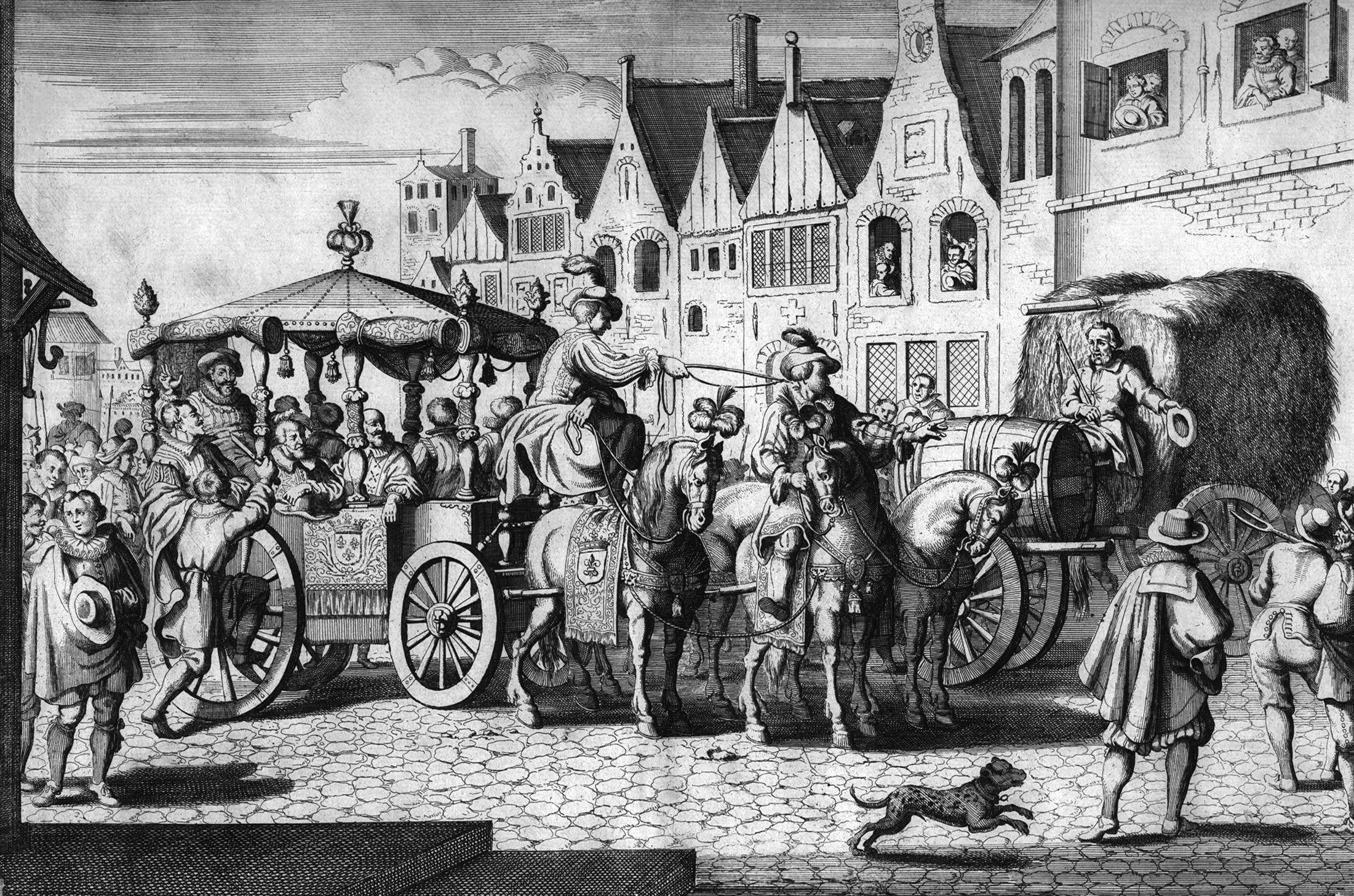
Engraving of the assassination of Henri IV

In 1610 Vitry was serving as the captain of Henri's personal bodyguard. On the day of the king's assassination, he ordered Vitry to leave him and go deal with preparations for the queens entry into Paris. Vitry was reluctant to leave the king, conscious that he was going to be travelling through the city that day to meet with the duke of Sully. He protested to the king that the capital was filled with 'strange and unknown' men at present, and this wasn't a wise course of action. After teasing Vitry that his true motive was to hang around the Louvre and flirt with the court ladies, Henri dismissed him, a few hours later the king would be dead. After word reached Vitry and the court of what had happened, Vitry was successfully able to turn around the Dauphin Louis' carriage from going out into the city.

== Reign of Louis XIII ==
One year after the death of Henri, he died.
His son Nicolas de L'Hôpital would become Marshal of France and Governor of Provence in 1631, serving in the post for 6 years. His other son François de L'Hospital became also a Marshal of France and Governor of Lorraine and Champagne.

== Sources ==
- Babelon, Jean-Pierre (2009). Henri IV. Fayard.
- Cloulas, Ivan (1979). Catherine de Médicis. Fayard.
- Constant, Jean-Marie (1996). La Ligue. Fayard.
- Harding, Robert (1978). Anatomy of a Power Elite: the Provincial Governors in Early Modern France. Yale University Press.
- Jouanna, Arlette (1998). Histoire et Dictionnaire des Guerres de Religion. Bouquins.
- Knecht, Robert (2016). Hero or Tyrant? Henry III, King of France, 1574-1589. Routledge.
- Pitts, Vincent (2012). Henri IV of France: His Reign and Age. Johns Hopkins University Press.
- Roelker, Nancy (1996). One King, One Faith: The Parlement of Paris and the Religious Reformation of the Sixteenth Century. University of California Press.
- Le Roux, Nicolas (2000). La Faveur du Roi: Mignons et Courtisans au Temps des Derniers Valois. Champ Vallon.
- Le Roux, Nicolas (2006). Un Régicide au nom de Dieu: L'Assassinat d'Henri III. Gallimard.
- Le Roux, Nicolas (2020). Portraits d'un Royaume: Henri III, la Noblesse et la Ligue. Passés Composés.
- Salmon, J.H.M (1979). Society in Crisis: France during the Sixteenth Century. Metheun & Co.
