= Château du Hallier =

French castle

Coordinates: 48°01′01″N 2°18′42″E

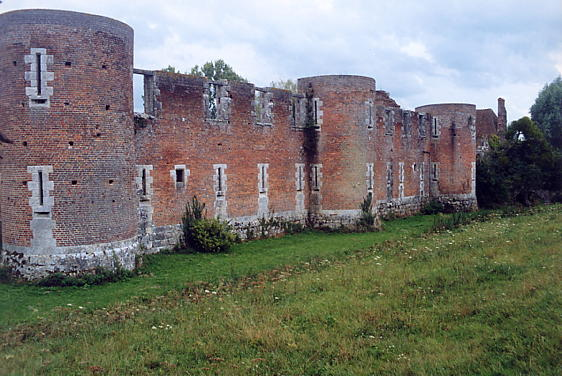
Western curtain wall

The Château du Hallier is a castle in the commune of Nibelle in the Loiret département of France.

== History ==
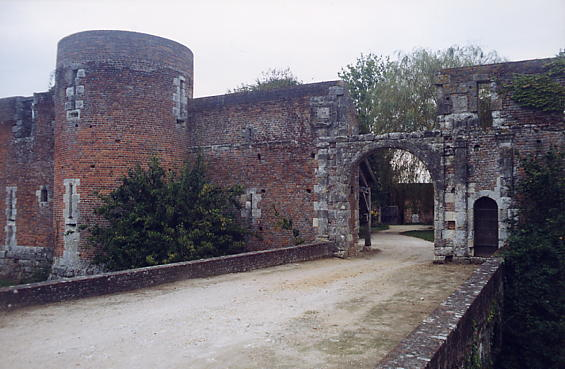
Entrance gate

The date of construction is not known precisely. It is recorded in the 15th century in deeds of sale. The castle was sold to Charles de l'Hospital in 1537.

In the 18th century, the castle was used as a quarry; the square second floor disappeared.

In the 19th century, the castle became a farm. One of the towers housed a potter's kiln until the early 20th century.

The castle is privately owned. It has been listed since 1967 as a monument historique by the French Ministry of Culture.

== See also ==
- List of castles in France
