= Treaty of Nemours =

1585 treaty between King Henry III of France and the Catholic League

The Treaty of Nemours (or Treaty of Saint-Maur) were articles that were agreed upon in writing and signed in Nemours on 7 July 1585 between the Queen Mother, Catherine de' Medici, acting for the King, and representatives of the House of Guise, including the Duke of Lorraine. Catherine hastened to Saint-Maur-des-Fossés, where on 13 July the treaty was signed between King Henry III of France and the leaders of the Catholic League, including Henri, duc de Guise. The King was pressured by members of the Catholic League to sign the accord which was recognized by contemporaries as a renewal of the old French Wars of Religion.

== Context ==
On 10 June 1584, François d'Alençon, duc d'Anjou, died. Since King Henry III of France was childless and likely to remain so, the legitimate successor to the throne of France was the king's distant cousin and chief of the Protestant party, Henry of Navarre. In the following spring, the Catholic League took control of many cities in northern France. In an attempt to gain control of the League, headed by members of the House of Guise, Henry III declared himself its chief, an act that forced him to break with Henry of Navarre.

== Terms ==
The treaty cancelled all previous edicts, dismissed all Huguenots from official office and forced the King to capitulate to the demands of the Catholic League. Moreover, the duc de Guise was given Châlons as a security. As a result, the entire north-eastern half of France was directly controlled by the House of Guise. Moreover, the Guises were promised significant subsidies. Henry III bluntly told Charles, Cardinal de Bourbon, that the overall accord would bring chaos and ruin to France. Nevertheless, the King signed the treaty in his attempts to outflank the Guise and become leader of the Catholic League himself. On 18 Julym he went in person to the Parlement of Paris to hold a lit de justice to force the Parlement to register the terms of the treaty, which gave them the effect of law, as well as royal prerogative.

On 19 July, the Catholic League promulgated its version of the edict, which reinforced the effects of the Treaty of Nemours. Based on the terms of the accord, all previous edicts granting religious and political concessions to the Huguenots were revoked. In short, the accord forbade the practice of all religions except Roman Catholicism in France. "Heretics" were not permitted to attain public office, and ministers from other religions were banned. All subjects had to convert to Catholicism or risk being expelled from France.

== Aftermath ==
Pope Sixtus V sealed the Treaty of Nemours by excommunicating the King of Navarre and his cousin, Henry I, Prince of Condé. Sixtus based his excommunication on the grounds that the throne of Navarre was vested in Saint Peter, his successors and the eternal power of God. As a result, the papal bull stripped the King of Navarre of his titles and denied him and his cousin the right to succeed the French throne. The papal bull invalidated all allegiances sworn to the King of Navarre by his vassals. The Treaty of Nemours and the events that ensued were responsible for the advent of the War of the Three Henrys, the final phase of the French Wars of Religion.

== See also ==
- List of treaties
