= Les Mignons =

Term for favourites of Henry III of France

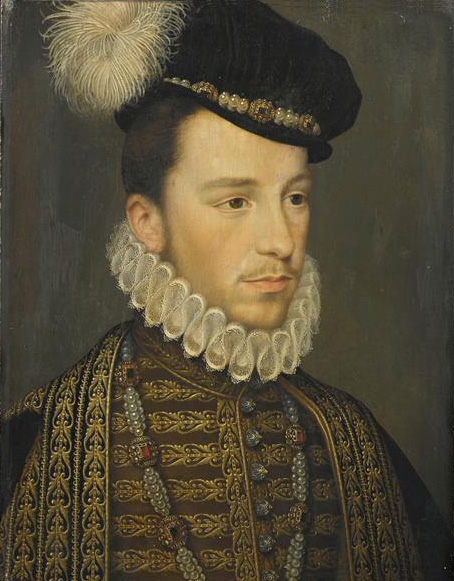
Henry III, then Duke of Anjou, dressed in elegant attire of 1570, including a "little bonnet of velvet". Painting by Jean de Court.

Les Mignons (from mignon, French for "the darlings" or "the dainty ones") was a term used by polemicists in the contentious atmosphere of the French Wars of Religion and taken up by the people of Paris, to designate the favourites of Henry III of France, from the time of his return from Poland to France in 1574 up to his assassination in 1589, an end to which perceptions of effeminate weakness may have contributed. The mignons were a group of a dozen or so reportedly frivolous and fashionable young men, mostly from the lower ranks of the French nobility, who were given gifts and high noble ranks by the King. Reports and rumors of the attributed heterodox sexuality of this group, and of the king himself, may have contributed to the popular resentment that some historians have found to be a factor in the subsequent disintegration of the late Valois monarchy.

== History ==
According to the contemporary diarist Pierre de l'Estoile, they made themselves "exceedingly odious, as much by their foolish and haughty demeanour, as by their effeminate and immodest dress, but above all by the immense gifts the king made to them." The Joyeuse wedding in 1581 occasioned one of the most extravagant displays of the reign.

The faction of the Malcontents, headed by Henry's younger brother François, duc d'Alençon, created duc d'Anjou in 1576 — the presumed heir as long as Henry remained childless — appear to have stirred up the ill will of Parisians against the mignons and the king. From 1576, the mignons were attacked by popular opinion, and some historians have credited without proof the scandalous stories of the time. Some fourteen favourites were singled out, including François d'Espinay, seigneur de Saint-Luc, who had accompanied Henry to his "exile" in Poland and was rewarded, following the royal return to France, with the château de Rozoy-en-Brie and the governorship of Brouage. The best known of the mignons, the archimignons in L'Estoile's Registre-Journal, who monopolised access to the king after the death of Henry's brother and heir the duc d'Alençon in 1584, were Anne de Joyeuse, baron d'Arques, created duc de Joyeuse (died 1587) and Jean Louis de Nogaret de La Valette, created duc d'Épernon.

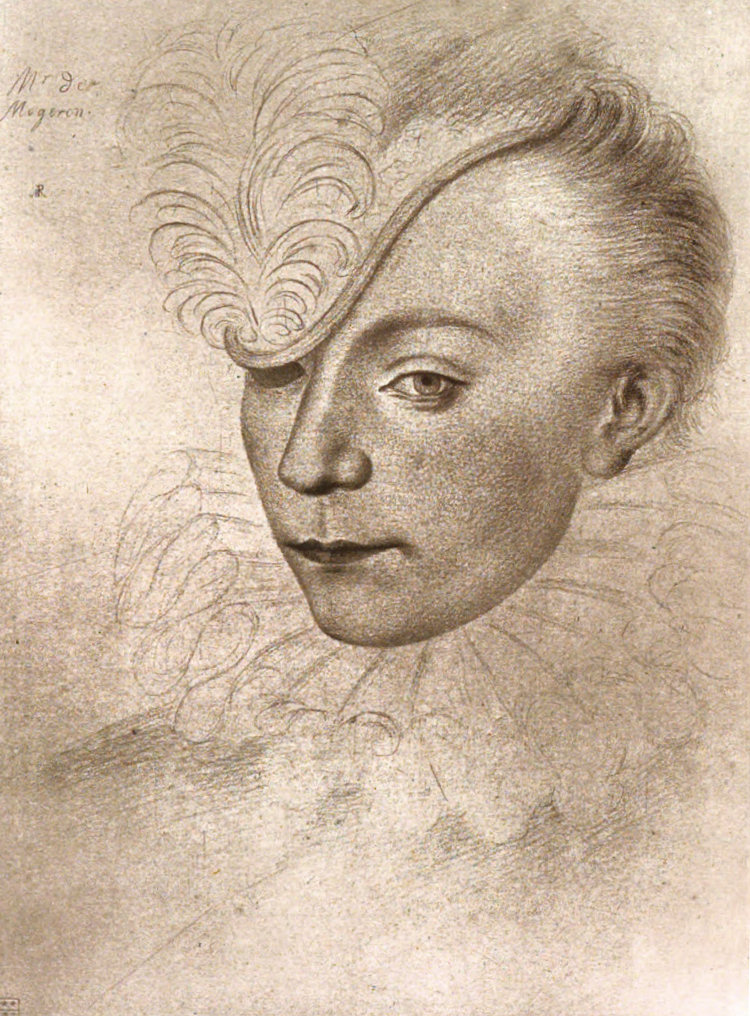
Contemporary portrait drawing of Louis de Maugiron

The appearance of the mignons on Henry's visits in July 1576 to the parishes of Paris to raise money to pay for the provisions of the Edict of Beaulieu (1576), occasioned a report by L'Éstoile:

"The name Mignons began, at this time, to travel by word of mouth through the people, to whom they were very odious, as much for their ways which were jesting and haughty as for their paint [make-up] and effeminate and unchaste apparel ... Their occupations are gambling, blaspheming ... fornicating and following the King everywhere ... seeking to please him in everything they do and say, caring little for God or virtue, contenting themselves to be in the good graces of their master, whom they fear and honor more than God."

L'Éstoile added "they wear their hair long, curled and recurled by artifice, with little bonnets of velvet on top of it like whores in the brothels, and the ruffles on their linen shirts are of starched finery and one half foot long so that their heads look like St. John's on a platter."

The figure of Ganymede (handsome cup-bearer to Zeus in ancient mythology) was employed in scurrilous sonnetry. The subtext of criticism within the court was most often that the mignons were not drawn from the top echelon of noble families, as had been the favourites of his late brother Francis II or their father Henry II, but rather from the secondary nobility; the problem included that the new favourites had been raised up to such a degree that the French court's calcified social fabric appeared to be unnaturally strained.

Some modern historians such as Robert Knecht have argued that the mignons "were not homosexuals, as is often assumed", nor were they "effeminate".

There would be echoes of this type of royal favouritism—and antipathy toward its beneficiaries—in other European royal courts in the years following the reign of Henri and les mignons: for example, during the reign of King James I and VI in Scotland and then in England.

=== The Duel of the Mignons ===
On 26 April 1578, Jacques de Lévis, comte de Caylus, one of Henry's favorites, insulted Charles de Balsac, baron de Dunes, who responded by challenging de Caylus to a duel. The following morning Caylus, with his seconds Maugiron and Livarot (of the party of the King), met Balsac, who had brought seconds Ribérac and Schomberg (of the party of Henry, Duke of Guise), at the horse market near the Bastille in Paris. The resultant fight was compared by Brantôme to a reenactment of the destructive mythological battle of the Horatii and the Curiatii.

In the melee, seconds Maugiron and Schomberg were killed, Ribérac died of wounds the following noon, and Livarot was wounded in the face and convalesced in a hospital for six weeks. Caylus sustained as many as 19 wounds and conceded the duel to Balsac, but died of his injuries a month later. Only Balsac got off with a mere scratch on his arm.

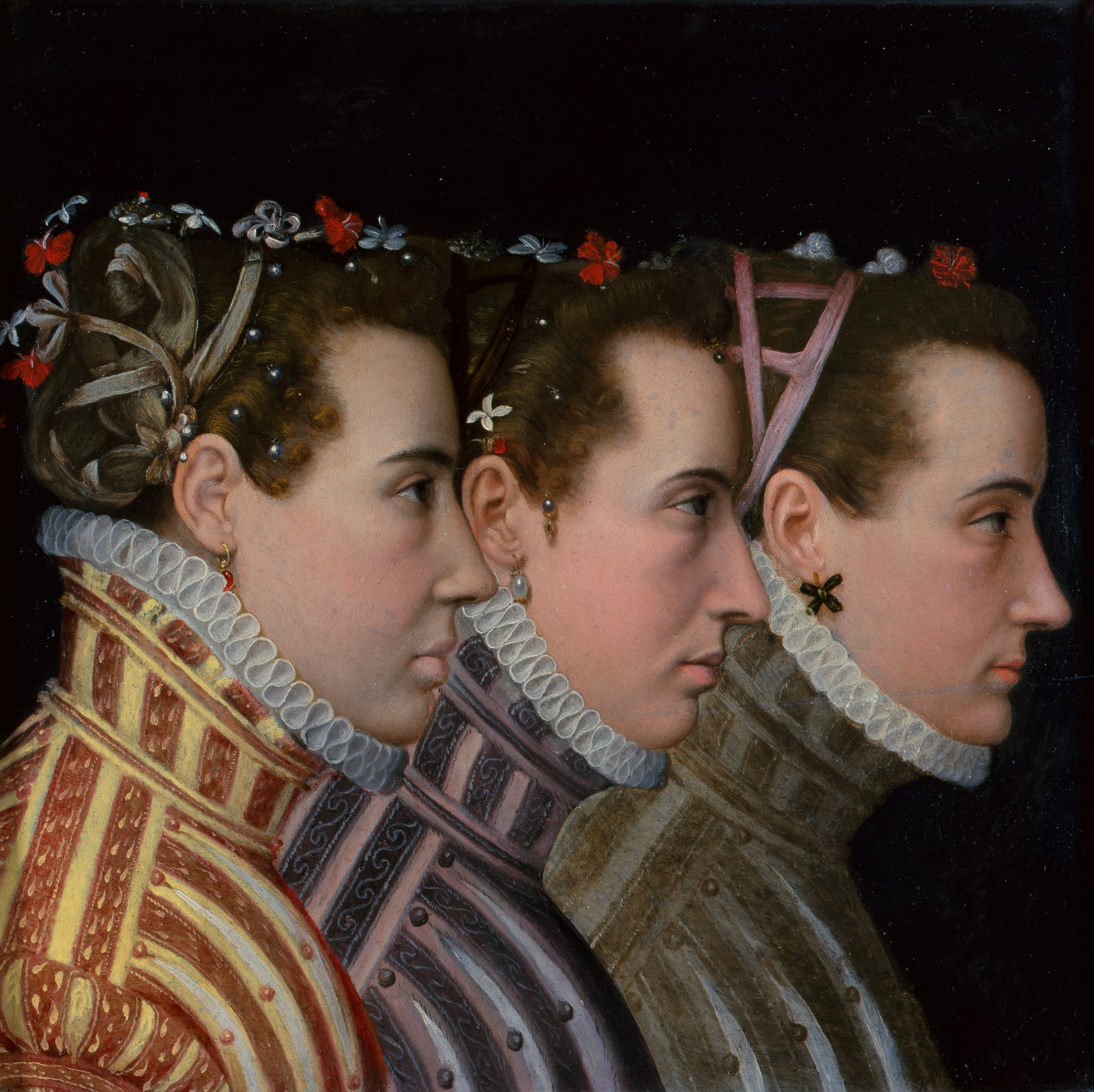
Triple Profile Portrait, 1570s, Milwaukee Art Museum. The Mignons of Henry III likely favored such fashion.

This fruitless and avoidable loss of life impressed itself on the public imagination and led to reform. Jean Passerat wrote an elegy, Plaintes de Cléophon, on the occasion. In the political treatise Le Theatre de France (1580) the duel was invoked as "the day of the pigs" who "killed each other in the precinct of Saint Paul, serving him in the Muscovite manner". Michel de Montaigne decried the event as une image de lâcheté, "an image of cowardice", and Pierre Brantôme connected it with the deplorable spread of the Italian and Gascon manners at Henry's court. King Henry III himself was so angered that he thenceforth banned dueling in France on penalty of death.

== See also ==
- Escadron volant
