= Charles de Balsac, baron de Dunes =

Late 16th-century French governor and royal favourite

Charles de Balsac
- baron de Dunes
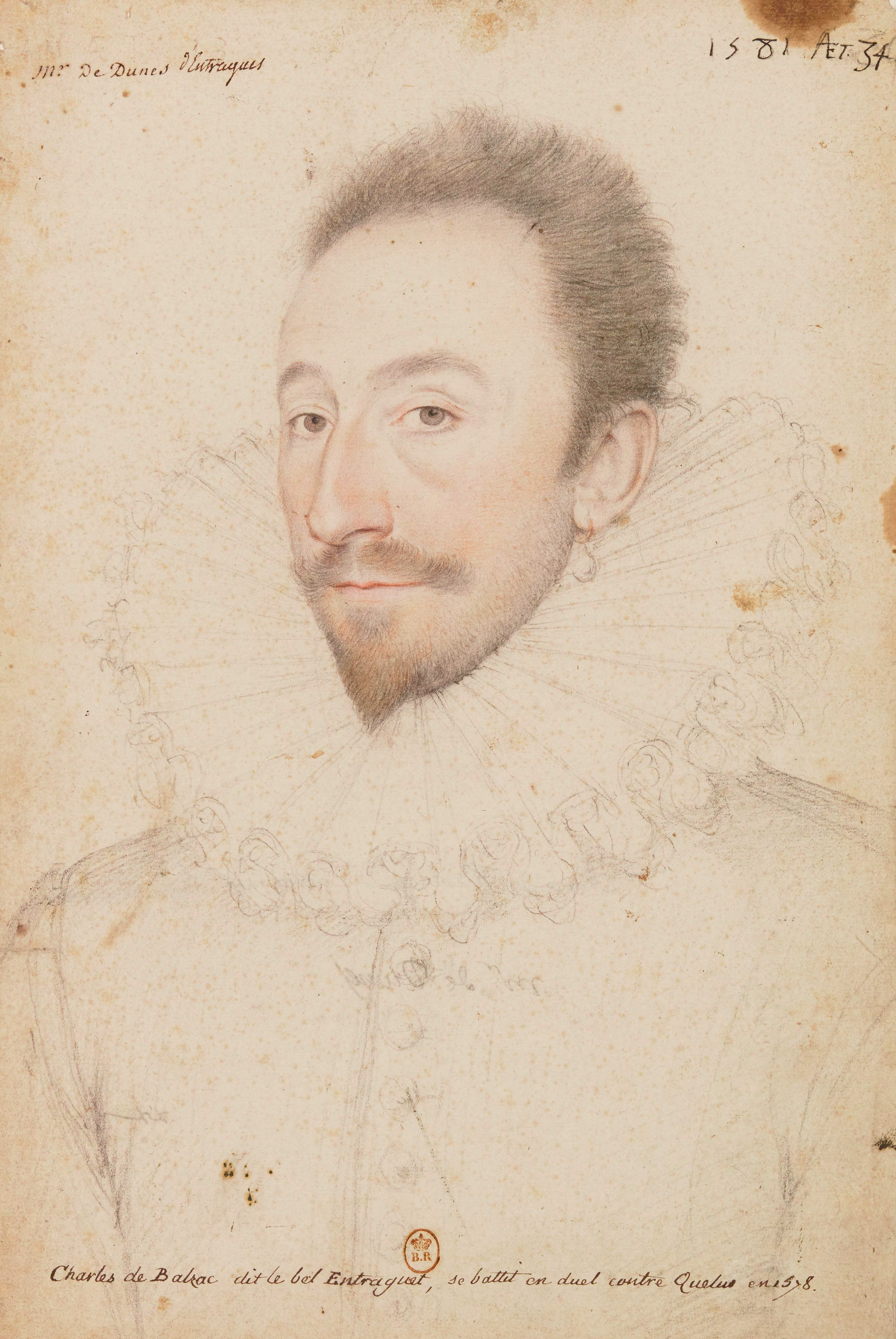
- Portrait of Entraguet from 1578
- Born: c. 1547
- Died: c. 1599
- Noble family: Maison d'Entragues
- Father: Guillaume de Balsac
- Mother: Louise d'Humières

Charles de Balsac, baron de Dunes (known as Entraguet or ‘the young’) (c. 1547 –c. 1599) was a French noble, governor, soldier and courtier during the French Wars of Religion. The third son of Guillaume de Balsac and Louise d'Humières, by 1571 he had become a gentilhomme de la chambre to the brother of the king, the duke of Anjou/ This relationship was aided by the two having been classmates at the Collège de Navarre. He fought under the duke at the siege of La Rochelle in 1573 before joining the prince when he was elected as king of the Commonwealth. He served in the new king's household as Chambellan. By the time Anjou returned to France as king Henri III in 1574 he had become one of the king's paramount favourites. This situation would not last and he would be usurped in the attentions of the king by Caylus, a matter he greatly resented. Resultingly he moved into the circle of the House of Lorraine, who his family had long been clients of.

On 27 April 1578 he and Caylus agreed to fight a duel, over an indeterminate slight. Each man brought two seconds from among the favourites of the court, for Caylus, Maugiron and Guy d'Arces. Entraguet meanwhile brought Ribérac and Schomberg. Unusually the seconds would participate in the duel. In the combat that followed four of the men would be killed, with Entraguet killing Caylus. The king was furious at Entraguet for murdering one of his dearest favourites. Henri was not however willing to fully disgrace Entraguet, and over the following years, he continued to receive signs of royal favour, becoming a chevalier de l'Ordre de Saint-Michel in 1580 and then governor of Saint-Dizier in 1586. His proximity to the Lorraine family did not lead to him joining the Catholic ligue that the duke of Guise refounded in 1584. His loyalty was rewarded with the lieutenancy of Orléans in 1588 and then the Orléannais in 1589. Unlike his older brothers he could not countenance service to a Protestant king upon the death of Henri and defected to the ligue. By 1595 he had returned to the royalist cause, and was rewarded by the, now Catholic Henri IV with appointment as a chevalier of the Ordre du Saint-Esprit.

== Early life and family ==
=== Family ===
Charles de Balsac, was born around 1547, the third son of Guillaume de Balsac and Louise d'Humières. He had two elder brothers, François de Balsac and Charles de Balsac, seigneur de Clermont and two sisters Louise de Balsac and Catherine de Balsac. His father served under the duke of Guise during the latter Italian Wars, seeing service during the famous defence of Metz. Alongside this responsibility he served as governor of Le Havre. Through his mother Louise the family was connected to the powerful Lorraine dynasty of whom the Humières were clients. The Balsac family were well established in the Massif-Central. They had served the kings of France going back to Jean de Balsac, who fought under Charles VII. His son held responsibilities including Chambellan to the king.

=== Marital life ===
Henri III accused Entraguet of having romantically pursued his sister Marguerite de Valois. In December 1577 he served as a witness to the signing of the marriage contract between his brother Entragues and Hélène Bon.

Entraguet hired the architect Baptise Androuet du Cerceau to renovate his Château de Tournanfy. In work conducted from 1580 to 1586 the medieval construction had round towers, a moat and pleasure garden added.

== Reign of Charles IX ==
Alongside fellow classmate the duke of Anjou, brother to the king, Entraguet studied at the Collège de Navarre. By this means he became very close to the prince. As the third son of the family, the patronage of a powerful prince like Anjou was particularly important for Entraguet.

=== Siege of La Rochelle ===
Entraguet established himself at court with the assistance of his elder brothers. By 1571 he was a member of the duke of Anjou's household and soon thereafter he became a gentilhomme de la chambre for the duke in 1572. He fought alongside the duke in his early military campaigns. Notably this involved his participation in the Anjou led 1573 siege of La Rochelle, the city having risen up in response to the Massacre of Saint Bartholomew.

=== Commonwealth ===
During 1573 Anjou was elected as king of the Commonwealth. He quickly departed from the siege he was conducting and made to head east. On route he passed through the city of Frankfurt where the party encountered a group of Walloon soldiers who angrily blamed the duke and his entourage of involvement in the Massacre of Saint Bartholomew. Entraguet reacted aggressively to their accusations, charging his horse into the company, and almost provoking a battle. This would however be averted.

During Anjou's brief reign in the kingdom, Entraguet served the king as a member of his household in the capacity of Chambellan, just as did his elder brother Charles de Balsac, seigneur de Clermont.

== Reign of Henri III ==
=== Favourite ===
Back in France, Anjou, now styling himself Henri III made a grand entrance to Lyon. He took to stalking the streets of the city with his close favourites D'O, Du Guast, Ruffec and Entraguet. Entraguet would be involved in the king's romantic indiscretions in the city. Shortly after the return of Henri and Entraguet to the French court from their time in the Commonwealth, Marguerite de Valois, attracted to Entraguet, paid a visit to his bedside while he was recovering from a wound.

Entraguet would find himself elevated to the honour of gentilhomme de la chambre du roi in December 1574. Entraguet's courtship of the king's sister resulted in his partial disgrace from royal favour. His alienation was furthered by the rise of Caylus among Henri's favourites at Entraguet's expense. Entraguet turned to the house of Lorraine as an alternative network of support after his alienation from the king, however this was less a desire to enter an opposing political alliance, and more a return to the default arrangement his family had enjoyed in the previous generation. At the Estates General called as a result of the Peace of Monsieur, Entraguet held a duel with Georges Babou de La Bourdaisière, a favourite of the king's brother Alençon

=== Duel of the mignons ===
In April 1578, the favourites of Henri, deprived of their regular enemy the duke of Alençon by his flight from court, turned their attentions to those men close to the duke of Guise. They quickly fell into dispute, and over a trivial matter a duel was arranged between three favourites of the king, led by Caylus and three favourites of the duke, led by Entraguet. The favourites of the king had allegedly fancied that Caylus would receive the duke of Guise's office of Grand Mâitre, the most senior office in the king's household. Alternative explanations for the duel include a dispute over a game of Jeu de Paume and over the right to court a woman. The two sides met at 05:00 on 27 April at the house market near the porte Saint-Antoine. Entraguet brought with him two seconds, Schomberg and Ribérac while Caylus brought Maugiron and Livarot.

The two sides fought in silence with rapiers, the duel representing the first time that seconds had participated in the fighting of a duel. In the fighting that followed over the next few hours Entraguet would square off against Caylus, delivering him 19 wounds, in return for which he received only a slight wound. Caylus is reported to have said to Entraguet ‘You have a dagger, and I have none’, to which Entraguet replied ‘You made a big mistake leaving it at home’. Only Entraguet and Livarot would walk out alive, and of them only Entraguet left in good condition, Livarot having received a nasty head wound for which he would convalesce for 6 weeks.

Contemporaries denounced the duel as a senseless waste of life, and rumours quickly swirled that Caylus had stated that he ‘renounced god’ as he expired, only adding to the disapproval of contemporary writers. Entraguet by contrast was singularly praised by the writers, in contrast to the “sodomites” that ‘composed Henri's inner’ he had shown himself to be of “valiant heart”. Henri was distraught at the death of two of his favourites, and prepared an elaborate burial and funeral for them. Henri was filled with fury for Entraguet for his killing of Caylus, and Entraguet beat a hasty retreat from court to avoid the king's wrath. Henri resisted however engaging in a prosecution against Entraguet for the death of his favourites, as this would reveal the responsibility of Caylus for arranging the duel and further would be an attack on the Lorraine family who he could not afford to move against. The duke of Guise for his part took Entraguet under his protection.

=== Partial favour ===
Shortly after the duel, the Lorraine family staged a grand departure from the court, as an expression of their displeasure at what had transpired.

Despite his partial disgrace, and his killing of Caylus, the king did not turn his back on him. In 1580 he received the honour of being inducted into the Ordre de Saint-Michel. Shortly thereafter he was made a captain of gendarmes.

In 1586 he received further favour from the king, despite their distance, with an appointment as governor of Saint-Dizier. His alienation from Henri's inner circle would never bring him into the Catholic ligue, unlike his eldest brother Entragues.

=== Brother ===
The king was keen to resecure the loyalty of Entraguet's elder brother, and as such tasked Épernon to bring him back into the royal fold. To this end Entraguet was dispatched in 1586 to entreat with his brother in Orléans. After a month of efforts Entraguet convinced Entragues to come to meet with the king and accept a deal for his return to favour.

After having resolved to assassinate the duke of Guise in 1588, Entraguet played the role of agent of the king in the plans for its realisation. During this year he was made lieutenant-general of Orléans.

During 1589 his lieutenant-generalcy was expanded from the city to the Orléannais. The assassination brought Henri into war with the ligue, and he was in turn assassinated on 1 August. Though he had remained a royalist while Henri III lived, he could not countenance serving Henri's heir, the Protestant Henri IV, and Entraguet defected to the ligue for a time.

== Reign of Henri IV ==
In 1594, shortly after his triumphant acquisition of Paris from the ligue, Henri wrote to Entraguet, urging him to hurry to court so that he might witness the majesty of the king's triumph over the kingdom. The following year, Henri elevated him to chevalier in the highest order of French chivalry, the Ordre du Saint-Esprit, which had been established by Henri III. He died in 1599.

== Sources ==
- Babelon, Jean-Pierre (2009). Henri IV. Fayard.
- Carroll, Stuart (2011). Martyrs and Murderers: The Guise Family and the Making of Europe. Oxford University Press.
- Chevallier, Pierre (1985). Henri III: Roi Shakespearien. Fayard.
- Cloulas, Ivan (1979). Catherine de Médicis. Fayard.
- Constant, Jean-Marie (1984). Les Guise. Hachette.
- Constant, Jean-Marie (1996). La Ligue. Fayard.
- Durot, Éric (2012). François de Lorraine, duc de Guise entre Dieu et le Roi. Classiques Garnier.
- Jouanna, Arlette (1998). Histoire et Dictionnaire des Guerres de Religion. Bouquins.
- Knecht, Robert (2014). Catherine de' Medici. Routledge.
- Knecht, Robert (2016). Hero or Tyrant? Henry III, King of France, 1574-1589. Routledge.
- Pitts, Vincent (2012). Henri IV of France: His Reign and Age. Johns Hopkins University Press.
- Roelker, Nancy (1996). One King, One Faith: The Parlement of Paris and the Religious Reformation of the Sixteenth Century. University of California Press.
- Le Roux, Nicolas (2000). La Faveur du Roi: Mignons et Courtisans au Temps des Derniers Valois. Champ Vallon.
- Le Roux, Nicolas (2006). Un Régicide au nom de Dieu: L'Assassinat d'Henri III. Gallimard.
- Salmon, J.H.M (1979). Society in Crisis: France during the Sixteenth Century. Metheun & Co.
