= Paul de Stuer =

French noble and military commander

Paul de Stuer de Caussade
- sieur de Saint-Mégrin vicomte de Calvignac
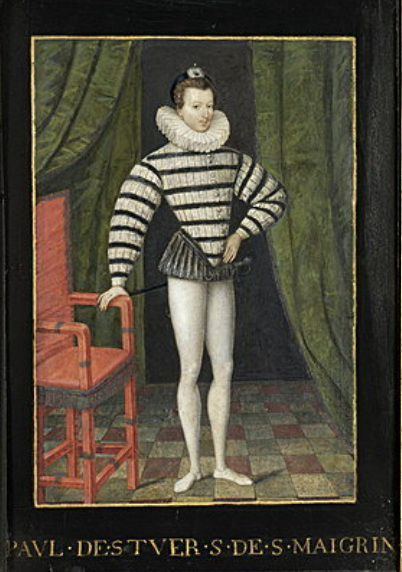
- Portrait of Saint-Mégrin
- Born: 1554
- Died: 22 July 1578 (aged 23–24)
- Noble family: House of Stuer de Caussade
- Spouse: Diane d'Escars
- Father: François de Stuer de Caussade
- Mother: Gabrielle de Maillé de la Tourlandry

Paul de Stuer de Caussade, sieur de Saint-Mégrin et vicomte de Calvignac (1554 – 22 July 1578) was a French noble, military commander and favourite of King Henry III during the French Wars of Religion. Coming from a leading Saintonge family, Saint-Mégrin was enriched by a sizable inheritance from his father. He was introduced to court life by the Duke of Guise shortly before Henry III departed as king of the Commonwealth. Quickly detached from Guise's entourage, he joined his new patron as king in the east, before returning with him to France upon the death of Charles IX.

He fought for the crown during the fifth and sixth civil war, commanding a company of light horse. By the sixth civil war he had been elevated to the role of maître de camp of the light horse, in the hopes of frustrating Guise's control over the crown's cavalry. In this capacity he fought in Auvergne in 1577, and wrangled with the Parlement of Bordeaux which did not trust him, leaving him isolated and vulnerable to the rebel Navarre. By 1578 Saint-Mégrin had been elevated to gentilhomme ordinaire de la chambre of Henry III, affording him considerable access to the king. He was also made a Chevalier of the Order of Saint Michael, an honour his father had also received in the preceding decade. In February 1578 he fought in an inconclusive engagement with the chief favourite of the king's brother Alençon.

In July 1578, the Duke of Guise had found evidence of an affair Saint-Mégrin was attempting to conduct with his wife. He further grated that a provincial noble would dare consider himself a social equal to a sovereign prince like himself. The duke's brother the Duke of Mayenne arranged for Saint-Mégrin's assassination, with over 20 men descending on him after he left the Louvre. In the early hours of 22 July he died. The king alone among the court mourned him, commissioning an elaborate tomb for him in Saint-Paul. This tomb was destroyed in 1589 by a Parisian crowd.

== Early life and family ==
=== Family ===
Saint-Mégrin came from a family based in the Saintonge that had served the French monarchy since at least the Hundred Years War. Saint-Mégrin inherited a large fortune. His father was a Chevalier de l'Ordre de Saint-Michel.

He was born in 1554, the second son of François de Stuer de Caussade, baron de Tonneins, Grateloup, Villeton, Montbrun, Puycorner et Saint-Mégrin, vicomte de Calvignac. His mother was Gabrielle de Maillé de la Tourlandry. She had married François in 1538. Paul inherited a large fortune from his father, who had accumulated valuable holdings.

=== Marriage ===
Paul de Stuer married Diane d'Escars in 1576. After his death, she would remarry his younger brother Louis, and together they would continue the de Stuer line.

== Reign of Charles IX ==
=== Favourite ===
Saint-Mégrin was not among the first generation of Henry III's favourites, who had been with him since the siege of La Rochelle, rather he came to the court after Henry's election as king of the Commonwealth. He was presented to the court by the Duke of Guise, whose patronage ensured his quick rise. The king was keen to isolate those who could threaten him by peeling off their protégés at court, and as such brought Saint-Mégrin into his circle.

== Reign of Henry III ==
=== Civil wars ===
During the fifth civil war, Saint-Mégrin, and another of Henry's favourites, Caylus, commanded companies of light horse. The peace that brought the civil war to a close would so enrage radical Catholics that civil war would quickly be resumed in 1577. During this short conflict, Saint-Mégrin commanded forces in Auvergne, for which the king rewarded him with a gift of 3000 livres. He struggled vainly against the forces of the king of Navarre in Angoumois, his plight not assisted by the opposition of the Bordeaux Parlement. The Parlement denied him entry to the city and threatened to seize him, on the pretext that he would betray the crown to the Protestants. Their suspicions were born of the fact that Saint-Mégrin's elder brother Jean was serving under Navarre. Saint-Mégrin found an ally in the seigneur de Lanssac, governor of Blaye, who afforded his troops entry despite the prohibition of the Parlement.

By 1576 Saint-Mégrin was a gentilhomme, affording him a yearly salary of 600 livres.

=== Maître de camp ===
In 1578 Saint-Mégrin became a Gentilhomme ordinaire de la chambre for the king, granting him privileged access to the king's person. That same year he became a captain in the gendarme, and maître de camp for the French light cavalry. This appointment was aimed at counterbalancing the authority the Duke of Guise held over the light cavalry in his capacity as colonel general. Saint-Mégrin succeeded another royal favourite in the position, La Guiche, who was granted the role of Grand Maître of the artillery in compensation, a title usurped from the Baron de Biron.

=== Bussy ===
While Henry was keen to supplant the Ordre de Saint-Michel with his new more prestigious Ordre du Saint-Esprit, Saint-Mégrin received the honour of induction into the former during 1578. In early 1578, with the return to court of Alençon, brother to the king, the violence between their respective favourites once more exploded. On 1 February, Saint-Mégrin, Livarot, D'O, Saint-Luc and Caylus led an attack on seigneur Bussy, favourite of Alençon, at the Porte Saint-Honoré, however he was able to evade the attack. He angrily demanded justice from the king for the attempt on his life.

=== Assassination ===
At 11 pm on 21 July 1578 Saint-Mégrin was hacked to pieces by 20 men shortly after he departed the Louvre, having been present for the king's coucher. During the assault he sustained over 20 wounds, and was in such bad condition contemporaries were surprised he survived the encounter. Despite the brutal nature of the attack his death was not immediate, and the king spent two hours by his bedside as he succumbed to his wounds in the early hours of 22 July.

The hit was commissioned by the Duke of Mayenne and came shortly after the deaths of several of Henry's favourites during the Duel of the Mignons. Mayenne had been enraged by Saint-Mégrin's romantic advances towards his brother's wife Catherine of Cleves. Ambassadors reported that the duke had surprised his wife while she was writing a letter to Saint-Mégrin. Further cause for Guise's displeasure came in the disrespect Saint-Mégrin showed to the man who had introduced him to court, and the presumptuousness of his social inferior to treat with him as an equal. He would go unpunished for his involvement in the deed despite the clarity in the king's mind as to who was responsible. Nevertheless, the Guise had departed court a month before the assassination in June, and would not return until March 1579, at which time they brought 700 horse with them to deter the king from exercising vengeance.

=== Aftermath ===
Upon his death he left many debts, including one of over 1000 livres to a wine supplier. It is possible that Henry had promised Saint-Mégrin the position of lieutenant-general of the Angoumois and Saintonge prior to his death, however his assassination cut any plans to that effect.

While his death was a personal blow to the king, Saint-Mégrin was detested by the rest of the court, so he mourned alone. Henry commissioned the poet Ronsard to write verse in honour of the three deceased men, had Arnaud Sorbin, who had given the eulogy for Charles IX, speak at their funerals, and commissioned Germain Pilon to fashion their tombs. Pilon established three sarcophagi, crafted from black marble in the church of Saint-Paul for the favourites. Each sarcophagi was topped with a figure reading from a book of hours. The tombs were seen as an abomination by radical Catholics in Paris, who destroyed them at the instigation of their preachers on 2 January 1589. According to the crowd that destroyed the tombs 'the rightful resting place of the men, was on a gibbet, not in a church'.

== Sources ==
- Cloulas, Ivan (1979). Catherine de Médicis. Fayard.
- Chevallier, Pierre (1985). Henri III: Roi Shakespearien. Fayard.
- Knecht, Robert (2016). Hero or Tyrant? Henry III, King of France, 1574-1589. Routledge.
- Le Roux, Nicolas (2000). La Faveur du Roi: Mignons et Courtisans au Temps des Derniers Valois. Champ Vallon.
- Salmon, J.H.M (1975). Society in Crisis: France during the Sixteenth Century. Metheun & Co.
