= Guy d'Arces =

French noble, military commander and favourite of king Henri III

- baron de Livarot
- Born: c. 1555
- Died: 2 May 1581, Blois
- Noble family: House of D'Arces
- Father: Jean d'Arces
- Mother: Jeanne de Maugiron

Guy d'Arces, baron de Livarot, Saint-Martin-de-la-Lieue et Giricourt (c. 1555–2 May 1581) was a French noble, military commander, and favourite of king Henri III during the French Wars of Religion. Scion to an ancient noble family of Dauphiné, he was elevated to court through his connections to his maternal uncle, Laurent de Maugiron, lieutenant-general of Dauphiné. He served as head of Maugiron's men-at-arms, during the fourth and fifth civil war. This included service under the overall command of Marshal Bellegarde during the ignominious siege of Livron. Around this time, he entered the favour of the king's brother Alençon, as his cousin had, serving the prince as his écuyer d'écurie.

It was through this that he came to the attention of the king, Henri, who desired to peel off the key regional favourites that his brother had acquired. During 1577 he elevated Livarot to the post of gentilhomme de la chambre du roi, and Livarot entered his service, abandoning his former patron Alençon. Livarot was close to another favourite of the kings, Caylus, during the tense months when Alençon was in the capital in early 1578. After Alençon fled court in February, Caylus, Livarot, and the other favourites of the king who had been menacing Alençon's favourites, turned their attentions to the favourites of the duke of Guise. Caylus attempted to engineer the transfer of the office of grand maître from the duke to himself. The favourites further sparred over women, and it was to this end that the famous 'duel of the mignons' arose on 27 April. Caylus, with Louis de Maugiron and Livarot as seconds, faced off against Guise's favourite Entraguet, with Ribérac and Schomberg as seconds. After the fight that followed, only two of the six would survive, Entraguet for the duke, and Livarot for the king, though he was severely wounded.

During 1580, Livarot secured a secondary patron, that of the duke of Nevers, who he represented in a legal case against the duke of Montpensier. Despite his earlier duel, Livarot would go on to serve under a member of the house of Guise at this time, fighting under Mayenne in Dauphiné at the siege of La Mure in October. Livarot brashly attempted to get the Protestant commander of the town to face him in a duel, but he declined. Tiring of the siege, Livarot departed in December for the court at Blois. He had by this time accumulated significant military office as maître de camp for the French infantry, and in his absence, his regiments became violently disorderly. In Blois he entered a new dispute over a woman with the marquis de Pienne. During the duel that followed on 2 May, both men were killed.

== Early life and family ==
Guy d'Arces was the son of Jean d'Arces, baron de Livarot with many holdings in Dauphiné, and Jeanne de Maugiron, sister of the magnate Laurent de Maugiron. Jean and Jeanne had married in 1544. Jean served as a lieutenant for Laurent de Maugiron. Guy d'Arces came from one of the oldest noble family in Dauphiné, with proof stretching back to 1160. He was cousins of another royal favourite, Louis de Maugiron. His uncle who had great influence at court, ensured that he was introduced there, and was an ally to his nephew in courtly matters.

Established in the capital, Livarot took up residence on a street in which many servants and favourites of the king resided, that of La Plâtrière. On this same road, another royal favourite François d'O would rent lodgings. During his career he was elevated to the Ordre de Saint-Michel.

== Reign of Charles IX ==
From 1573 to 1576, he led a company of men-at-arms that was under the authority of his uncle, serving in both the fourth and fifth civil wars with the company. In this capacity he served under Marshal Bellegarde during the failed Siege of Livron, from late 1574 to early 1575.

== Reign of Henri III ==
=== Alençon ===
Initially a member of Alençon's household, Livarot served as écuyer d'écurie to the young prince. Livarot was one of many men detached by the king to become a membeËr of his inner circle. Alongside Livarot as former favourites of Alençon were his cousin Louis de Maugiron, Henri de Saint-Sulpice and Gilles de Souvré.

In 1577 the king elevated Livarot as one of his gentleman of the chamber. During this year he broke with Alençon, and was no longer a member of his household.

=== Brother against brother ===
With Alençon's return to court in early 1578, the situation in the capital between the king and his brother was explosive. Bussy and Caylus, ascendant favourites of their respective princes clashed repeatedly. Livarot for his part expressed his deep friendship for Caylus, and his willingness to follow his political lead.

=== 'Duel of the Mignons' ===
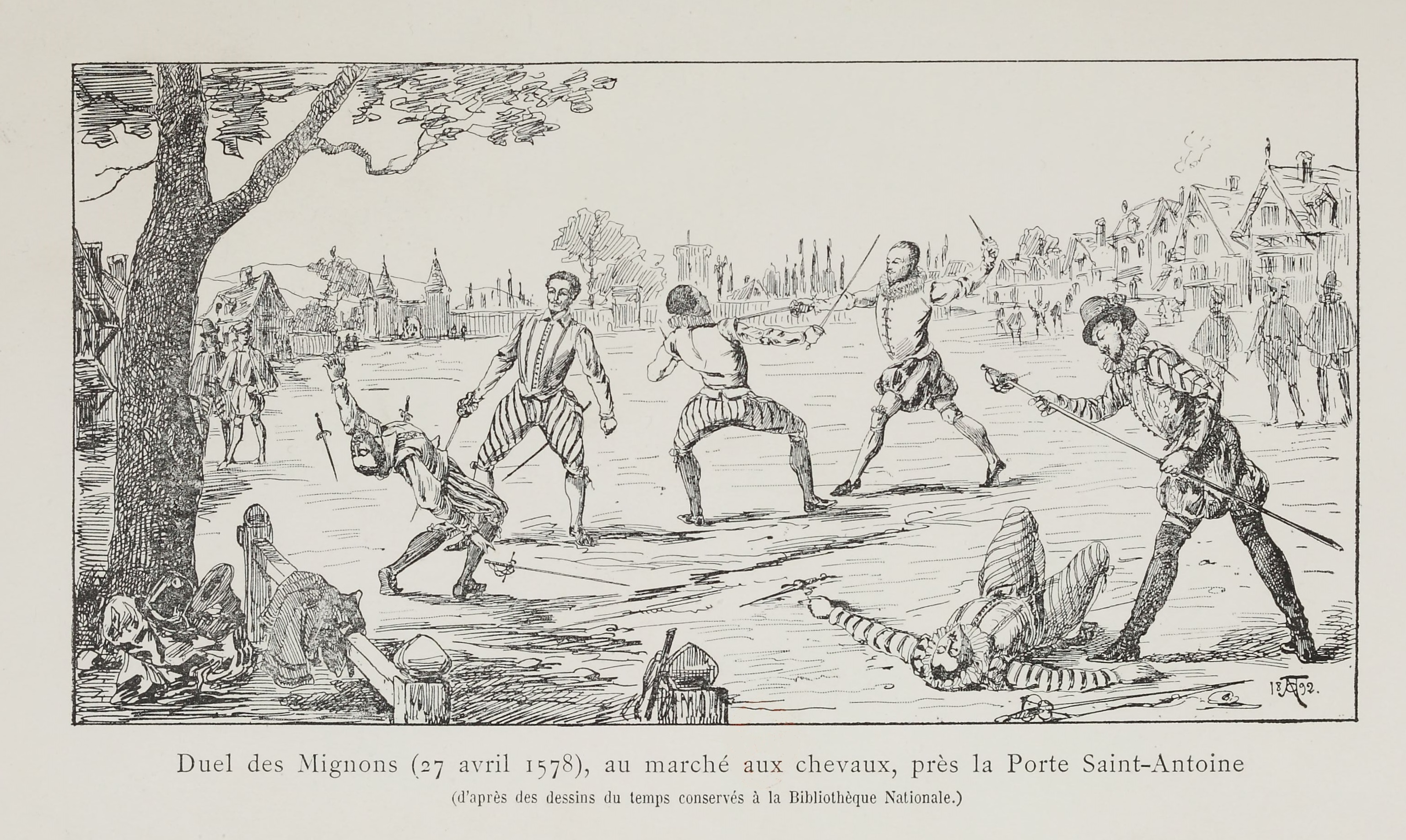
Nineteenth century interpretation of the fight

The situation became too much for Alençon, and he fled court in February. Shortly after his departure, the favourites of Henri began quarrelling with those of the duke of Guise. At 5am on 27 April, members of the two groups of favourites met for a duel. On one side was Caylus, with Maugiron and Livarot as his seconds. On the other side was Entraguet, with Ribérac and Schomberg as his seconds. The two sides met at the horse market near porte Saint-Antoine, in the hopes of settling a dispute that had nominally arisen over a woman, according to Brantôme. The king's favourites had been angling to strip Guise of his office of grand maître so that it might be given to Caylus, and it is possible this was also a factor in the duel. The duel was kept a secret from the court, as the king had intervened to stop a previous duel that had been arranged between the favourites on 2 April.

In the rapier combat that followed, Maugiron was killed on the field, and Caylus wounded in such a way as to linger on for a month before dying. For the duke of Guise, Ribérac died the next day. Livarot for his part was the only favourite of the king to survive the encounter, he had squared off against Schomberg during the engagement, and it was from him that he received a severe blow to the head, that would keep him convalescing for the next six weeks. In return for the blow to his head, Livarot delivered a blow to Schomberg's heart, killing him on the field. During the weeks that followed Livarot found himself on the edge of life and death.

15 days after the duel, the Guise family departed en masse from court. At some point in the year 1578, Livarot received the honour of becoming a captain of light horse. He combined this with his previous authority over 100 men-at-arms.

=== Seventh war of religion ===
In 1580, he fought under the command of Mayenne in Dauphiné, during the seventh war of religion. Mayenne hoped to defeat the Protestant overall commander in the region Lesdiguières. Together they fought at the siege of La Mure in October. During the conflict he was engaged in combat with the Protestant captain Aspremont. Feeling confident in his personal combat ability, he challenged Aspremont to come out from the town and duel him, however Aspremont declined. To rally his men before the fight, Aspremont urged them to charge Livarot and his regiment, derisively noting that Livarot was a mignon, an increasingly vituperate insult for royal favourites. In December, Livarot left his regiment to continue the siege and retired to Blois. Increaingly rowdy in the absence of Livarot, his units engaged in violence against local villagers.

A little while later, he was granted the privilege of being maître de camp for the infantry. This afforded him authority over 2000 men.

=== Nevers ===
During 1580, he developed a new line of patronage, becoming friends with the duke of Nevers. He supported Nevers in the conduct of a dispute with the duke of Montpensier. Livarot and Crillon served as witnesses in support of his legal case against the prince.

=== Final duel ===
The following year, while the court was resident at Blois, he entered a new quarrel over a woman, arranging a duel for her favour with Antoine d'Hallwyn the marquis de Piennes on 2 May. During the fight that followed both he and his opponent were killed.

Laurent de Maugiron had been attempting to secure from the king a guarantee that Livarot could inherit his office of lieutenant-general of Dauphiné. He was greatly grieved by the death of his nephew.

== Sources ==
- Cloulas, Ivan (1979). Catherine de Médicis. Fayard.
- Chevallier, Pierre (1985). Henri III: Roi Shakespearien. Fayard.
- Jouanna, Arlette (1998). Histoire et Dictionnaire des Guerres de Religion. Bouquins.
- Knecht, Robert (2016). Hero or Tyrant? Henry III, King of France, 1574-1589. Routledge.
- Le Roux, Nicolas (2000). La Faveur du Roi: Mignons et Courtisans au Temps des Derniers Valois. Champ Vallon.
