= Jacques de Lévis =

French noble and favourite of King Henri III

- comte de Caylus/Quélus
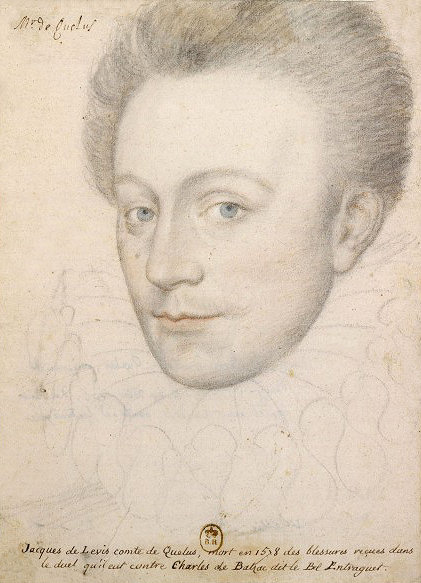
- Portrait of Caylus
- Born: 1554
- Died: 29 May 1578, Paris
- Noble family: House of Lévis
- Father: Antoine de Lévis
- Mother: Balthazarde de Prez

Jacques de Lévis, comte de Caylus (c. 1554–29 May 1578) was a French noble and favourite of King Henri III during the French Wars of Religion. Coming from a prominent Rouergue family, Caylus entered court life when dispatched by his father, the seneschal of Rouergue to court in 1572 to inform King Charles IX of the failure of the sieges of Montauban and Millau. The following year he began his association with the king's brother Anjou, future Henri III, fighting under his command during the siege of La Rochelle. With Anjou's election as king of the Commonwealth, Caylus travelled with his new patron to the country, being elevated to the position of 'gentleman of the chamber' in Anjou's capacity as king of the Commonwealth.

With Anjou's return to France as king Henri III in 1574, Caylus, increasingly close to the king, travelled with him. During the king's stay in Lyon he was elevated to the title of count. During the following civil war, he and his company fought under the authority of the Duke of Guise in a campaign that culminated at Dormans. In November 1575 he became a gentlemen of the chamber for Henri in his capacity as king of France. In the sixth civil war he fought near Brouage where he was captured by Protestant forces. An enemy of the seigneur de Bussy favourite to the king's brother Alençon he led the king's favourites in a showdown with the noble and his retinue in February 1578. Neither side delivered a fatal blow and Henri frustratedly insisted the two men make a show of reconciliation. In April of that year Caylus instigated the infamous 'duel of the Mignons', in which he with his seconds Maugiron and Livarot fought Entraguet and his seconds with rapiers. During the fight that followed, Maugiron, Ribérac and Schomberg were killed and Caylus was stabbed 19 times. Caylus lingered for another month while the king devoted daily attentions to him, but eventually he died on 29 May. The king mourned his loss to an extent that was viewed improper by contemporaries and commissioned an elaborate tomb for his dead favourites. This tomb was destroyed in 1589.

== Early life and family ==
=== Family ===
Caylus was from the prominent Languedoc family of Lévis, a branch of which (Lévis-Ventadours) would control the lieutenant-generalcy of Languedoc for much of the 17th century, alongside the governorship of Limousin. In Knecht's estimation the family was one of the most prominent families of the Massif Central.

=== Father ===
Antoine de Lévis, Caylus' father married Balthazarde de Prez in 1536, the daughter of the Marshal Antoine de Lettes-Desprez. After her death he remarried to Suzanne d'Estissac. Elevated to a knight of the order of Saint-Michel in 1561. In 1568 he was elevated to seneschal of Rouergue, then governor of the province in 1574. In 1581 Henri inducted him into the Ordre du Saint-Esprit. This role made him the most important man in the Rouergue and thus gave him an important role to play in enforcing the edicts of pacification, in 1573 he tried to persuade Damville to contain the Protestants of his governorship.

Caylus entered political life in 1572, when he was dispatched to court by his father, to inform the king of Antoine's failure to reduce the Protestant towns of Montauban and Millau.

A cousin of another royal favourite Henri de Saint-Sulpice, Caylus hoped to marry a woman of the Saint-Sulpice family, and corresponded on the matter, but no arrangements were reached before his death.

=== Reputation ===
The king nicknamed Caylus 'Petit Jacques' or alternatively 'Petit' and 'Jacquet'. He had a reputation for beauty, being compared to Adonis and 'a spring flower that will not see summer'. Brantôme emphasised the bravery and honesty of the 'young duellists' at court, such as Caylus. Other commentators were not as kind to Caylus and the other favourites of Henri, denouncing them as 'sodomites'.

== Reign of Charles IX ==
=== La Rochelle ===
At the age of 18, Caylus was among the ambitious young nobles who flocked to join the siege of La Rochelle, the city having gone into rebellion after the Massacre of Saint Bartholomew. Of a similar generation to the duke of Anjou, brother to the king, the siege afforded him and other notables a proximity to the king's brother they could not have acquired at court.

=== Commonwealth ===
The siege having been brought to a close by Anjou's election as king of the Commonwealth, Caylus travelled with the prince for his brief rule as king of the country. During his stay in the Commonwealth, Anjou elevated Caylus to the office of 'gentleman of the chamber' in his Polish court. Upon hearing of his brother's death, and the vacancy of the French throne, Anjou, now styling himself Henri III determined to race back, abandoning his kingship in the Commonwealth. Sneaking out of Kraków he rendezvoused with René de Villequier, Caylus and Pibrac near Oświęcim who were leading a separate body of French gentleman, guides and translators, from where they continued their flight back to France.

== Reign of Henri III ==
=== Favourite ===
Upon re-entering France, Henri stalked the streets of Lyon with his close friends, among them François d'O, Du Guast and Caylus. While tarrying in Lyon Henri approved the elevation of Caylus' fief to a county, confirming a promise he had made to his friend the previous year. Henri's favourites, Caylus among them detested Bussy, favourite of the king's brother. To this end they filled the king's mind with stories of Bussy's boastfulness. The king would authorise an attempt to kill Bussy by du Guast, but it would be a failure. The civil war that had started in the final year of Charles IX's reign had not yet concluded, and Caylus joined the duke of Guise, for his campaign which concluded in the victory at Dormans. Caylus by this time commanded a company. In November 1575 Caylus became gentleman of the chamber to the French king, taking up a post he had previously held in the Commonwealth.

By 1576, Caylus was among Henri's closest favourites, one of the four that he termed 'ma troupe' in letters, alongside Saint-Sulpice, d'O and Saint-Luc. During the sixth civil war in 1577, he fought with the crown, and was captured by a Protestant army near Brouage, alongside La Guiche, another favourite of Henri's.

=== Showdown ===
On 1 February 1578, Caylus participated in a showdown at the Porte Saint-Honoré with Bussy. Fighting alongside Caylus against the favourites of Alençon was d'O and Saint Mégrin among others. Both having made it out of the fight alive, the king voiced his displeasure at their continued fighting, and insisted that Caylus and Bussy make a demonstration of their reconciliation before the court. Bussy embraced Caylus to his chest, and kissed him, causing much of the court to burst out laughing.

=== Duel of the Mignons ===
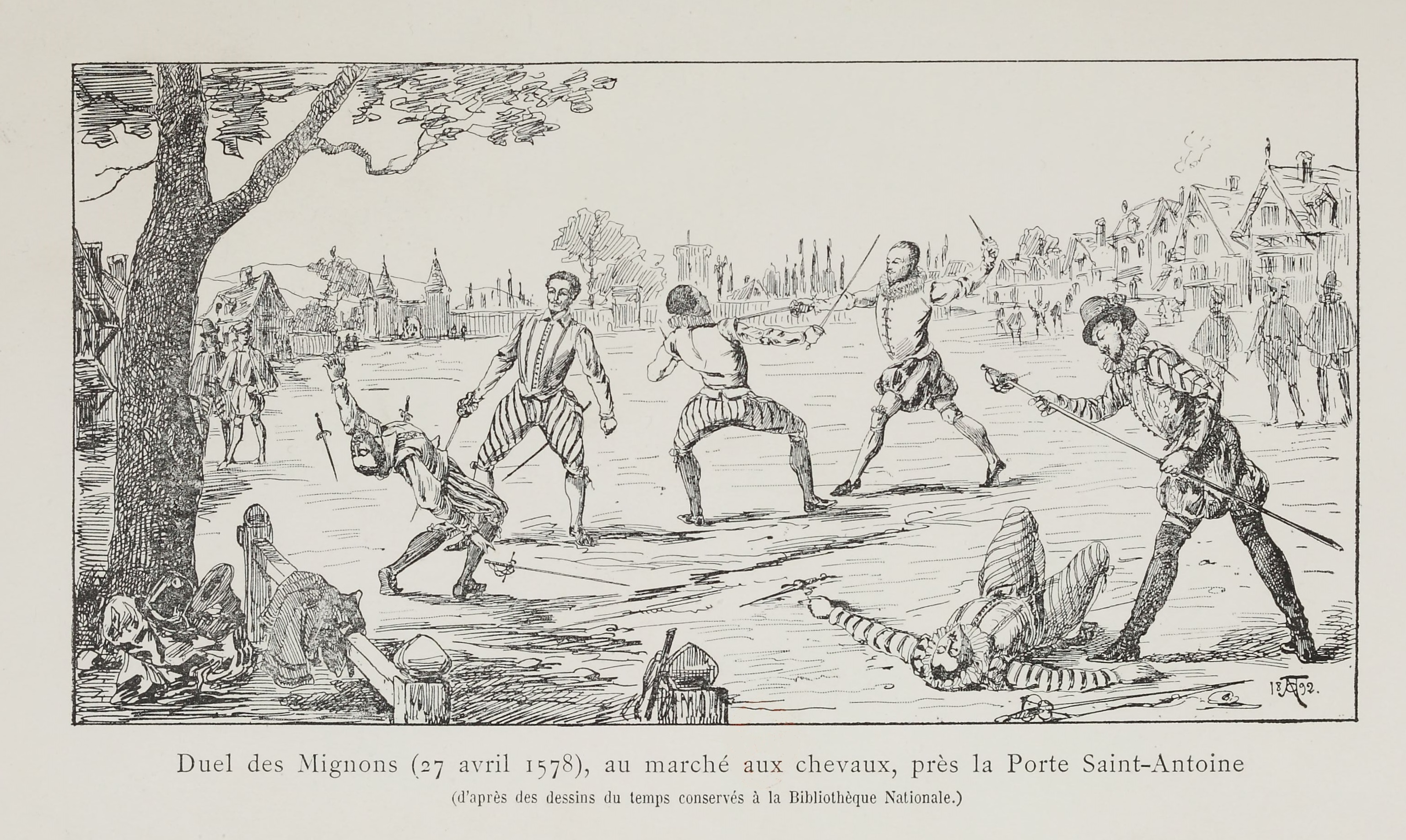
Nineteenth century interpretation of the fight

On 27 April 1578, Caylus was involved in the 'Duel of the Mignons' between favourites of Henri III and those of the Duke of Guise. Representing Henri were Caylus, Maugiron and Livarot; representing Guise were Ribérac, Schomberg and Entraguet. The two sides met at 5am near the horse market at Porte Saint-Antoine to fight with rapiers. The cause of the quarrel was obscure, a dispute over woman started by Caylus. Livarot and Maugiron were Caylus' second and third respectively, while Schomberg and Ribérac were second and third to Entraguet. Caylus was wounded with 19 sword blows in the fight that followed, while Maugiron, Ribérac and Schomberg were killed. It was reported that each time he was struck Caylus cried out 'Long live the king'. Fifteen days after the duel, the Guise family at large departed court. The fight was denounced by contemporaries as a senseless waste of life. Though Brantôme praised the fight as a 'beautiful combat'. L'Estoile who compiled parisian remembrances of the event, found that almost every pamphlet praised Entraguet for his victory, while denouncing Henri's favourites as 'sodomites'. Henri visited him daily at the hôtel de Boisy as he neared the end of his life, ordering that traffic outside the hôtel be stopped to afford them quiet together. Desperately Henri offered 100,000 livres to any surgeon who could save him. After having lingered for 33 days, he died on 29 May.

After his death Caylus was laid in state with his face left open, an honour usually reserved for nobles of the highest rank. The king took a pendant from Caylus' ear and kept it as a memento, along with a lock of hair. The king approached his death as had a prince of the blood died, receiving condolences from the court. Germain Pilon, the master sculptor was commissioned to provide appropriate burials in Saint-Paul for the favourites. He fashioned large sarcophagi out of black marble with a figure kneeling as they read a book of prayer on the top of the sarcophagus. His tomb would not survive, destroyed by militant Catholics in 1589. The angry mob destroying the tombs argued their rightful place of rest was on a gibbet.

== Sources ==
- Chevallier, Pierre (1985). Henri III: Roi Shakespearien. Fayard.
- Harding, Robert (1978). Anatomy of a Power Elite: the Provincial Governors in Early Modern France. Yale University Press.
- Jouanna, Arlette (1998). Histoire et Dictionnaire des Guerres de Religion. Bouquins.
- Knecht, Robert (2014). Catherine de' Medici. Routledge.
- Knecht, Robert (2016). Hero or Tyrant? Henry III, King of France, 1574-1589. Routledge.
- Le Roux, Nicolas (2000). La Faveur du Roi: Mignons et Courtisans au Temps des Derniers Valois. Champ Vallon.
- Salmon, J.H.M (1975). Society in Crisis: France during the Sixteenth Century. Metheun & Co.
