= Bertrand-Rambaud de Simiane =

Bertrand-Rambaud V de Simiane
- baron de Gordes
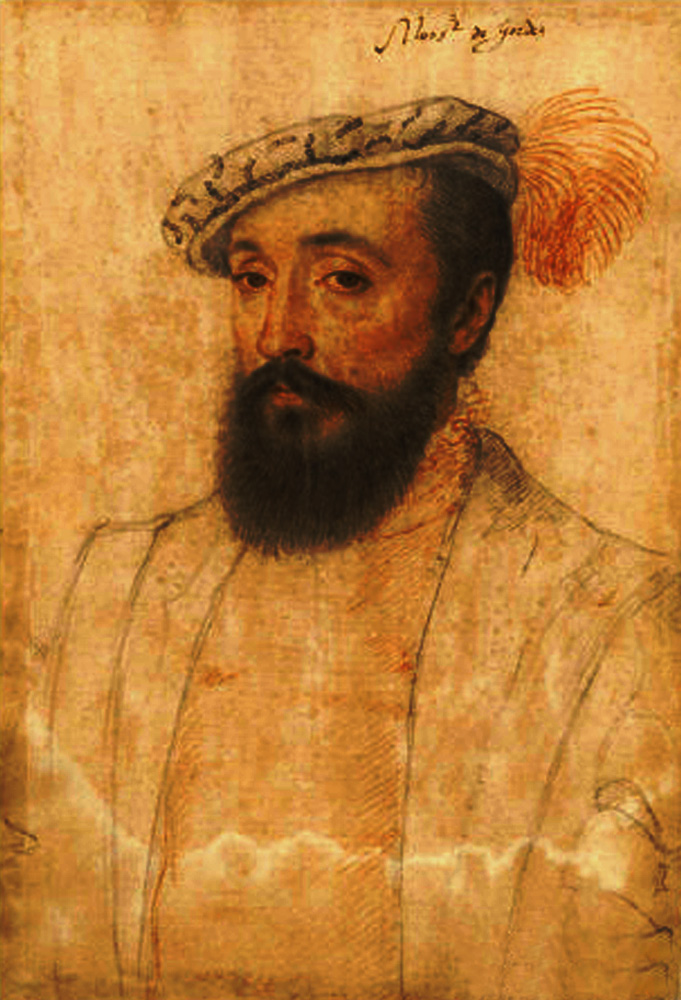
- Portrait of Gordes
- Other titles: Knight of Saint-Michel; Lieutenant-General of Dauphiné
- Born: c. 1513
- Died: c. 1578; Kingdom of France
- Spouse: Guigonne Alleman
- Issue: Baltesard de Simiane
- Father: Bertrand-Rambaud IV de Simiane
- Mother: Pierrette de Pontevez

Bertrand-Rambaud V de Simiane, baron de Gordes (c. 1513-c. 1578) was a French military commander and lieutenant-general of Dauphiné. First achieving prominence during the latter Italian Wars of Henri II he fought in the Piedmont campaign of 1552, becoming governor of Mondovì a post which he would hold until 1556. He fought in the famous Metz campaign of late 1552 and would go on to serve in the disastrous Picardy campaign.

With peace declared in 1559 he found himself achieving further advancement under the young king Charles IX receiving the Order of Saint-Michel in 1561, and then being elevated to Lieutenant-General of Dauphiné in 1564, replacing the disgraced Laurent de Maugiron. Far more moderate religiously than Maugiron he sought to govern the religiously contentious region through a greater deal of compromise. When civil war resumed in 1567 he was initially successful, but the combined forces of the Protestant nobles in the region forced him to retreat to Lyon. With baron des Adrets support he re-entered Dauphiné in early 1568, but peace was declared before he could achieve notable success.

In the third civil war Gordes and Guillaume de Joyeuse attempted to stop the local Protestant armies joining their compatriots in Languedoc, they were however unsuccessful. Gordes was equally unsuccessful when he attempted to stop Montbrun from re-entering the territory. With the Massacre of Saint Bartholomew unfolding in 1572, Gordes resisted pressures to spread it into Dauphiné. In the following years however he would unite with the Catholic nobility of the province in a league.

== Early life and family ==
Bertrand-Rambaud V de Simiane baron de Gordes was born on 18 October 1513. He was the eldest son of Bertrand-Rambaud IV de Simiane, baron de Gordes et Caseneuve and Pierrette de Pontevez. Together his parents would have 18 children.

At a young age he was entrusted to Bayard, under whom he would gain his first military service fighting in the Italian Wars.

In 1552 Gordes married Guigonne Alleman, daughter of Charles Alleman and Anne d'Albigny. Together they had six children:

- Laurent
- Gaspard
- Baltesard (1562-1586) baron de Gordes
- Charles
- Laurence
- Marguerite

== Reign of François I ==
Under the guidance of Bayard, Gordes would travel to the defence of Mézières at the age of only 7. When in 1524 Bayard was killed, Montmorency would oversee Gordes further education in military matters. Over the following years he would accompany Montmorency on his campaigns.

== Reign of Henri II ==
In 1547 Montmorency sent out Gordes to receive Vielleville on his return from an ambassadorial mission, accompanying him with many lords into Paris.

=== Italian Wars ===
With the resumption of the Italian Wars in 1551, Brissac tasked Gordes with capturing the castle of Queiras. After trying and failing to assault the garrisoned settlement, he was repulsed. Nevertheless, he was able to hold off several attacks on Mondovì of which he had been granted the role of governor. In March he seized the commune of Marsaglia and held off an attempt to recapture it. After this campaign he returned to France later in the year.

After participating in the German campaign of late 1552, he returned to his governorship of Mondovì and in 1554 captured some nearby settlements alongside Bonnivet.

=== Picard Campaign ===
In 1556 he was granted leadership of a company of men-at-arms, however in the same year he lost his governorship of Mondovì. After the disaster at Saint-Quentin in 1557, Gordes was among those under the authority of d'Andelot who had bolstered admiral Coligny's garrison in the town, and as such was subject to a siege from the Imperial army. Wounded in the assault that overcame the fortifications, he was left for dead by the Spanish.

In 1559 he was sent from Paris to find out the financial situation of Brissac's army, which had turned to marauding in the Piedmont countryside. He urged the troops to be patient and that funds would come, but was able to offer little more than moral support.

== Reign of Charles IX ==
=== Promotion ===
King Charles IX who had succeeded his short-lived brother in December 1560, awarded Gordes the collar of the Order of Saint-Michel in 1561. This was followed with further promotion to gentleman of the kings chamber and adviser to the conseil privé. The following year he was sent to Arles to calm the notables of the city after the disorder of the previous year.

In 1564 he was tasked with replacing the recently disgraced Laurent de Maugiron, who had favoured the militant Catholics too strongly in his short lieutenant-generalcy for the preservation of order in the province of Dauphiné. Due to the fact that the governor of Dauphiné was the absentee Prince La Roche-sur-Yon and upon his death Louis, Duke of Montpensier, this meant that Gordes was the acting governor of the territory as well as its lieutenant-general.

He began his administration by restoring Catholic worship in several cities where it had been suppressed during the first civil war, before entering Grenoble in early 1565.

=== Peace and Moulins ===
He was among those notables who attended the king at Moulins in 1566 when the king oversaw the coerced reconciliation of the House of Guise and House of Montmorency alongside publishing a decree of judicial reform. The long peace was not to last however, and Protestant uprisings would consume Dauphiné, many of the towns that Gordes had overseen the subduing of rose up in revolt again including Valence. Gordes went on a tour of the province, trying to talk towns down from their uprising, travelling across the Haut-Dauphiné, succeeding in bringing his authority back to many smaller settlements there. He was able to charm the leading Protestant military leaders of the region, Montbrun and Lesdiguières.

The Catholic leadership of Grenoble were frustrated by the generous tone he took with Protestants and complained to the court of his 'Protestant biases'. Maugiron, who remained resentful of the fact his leadership of Dauphiné had been usurped by Gordes joined this delegation, however it was to come to nought and Jacques, Duke of Nemours defended Gordes leadership at court.

As late as 24 September several days before the Protestant nobility would attempt a coup during the Surprise of Meaux with the aim of seizing the king and killing Lorraine, Catherine was writing to Gordes, urging him to ensure that the peace was maintained in Dauphiné. With the formal outbreak of civil war Mouvans seized Vienne and ransacked the town. Gordes hurried to the city and forced Mouvans to withdraw from the settlement. Gap, Romans, Valence all fell to the Protestant rebels in turn.

=== Second war of religion ===
Gordes raised an army to fight the rebels, leaving de Chissay at Grenoble to defend one of the few major towns he still held. The duke of Nemours, who had been raising troops in Piedmont entered the region, and the two joined forces, and after providing a new strong garrison to Vienne marched on Saint-Marcellin. Cardé, a lieutenant of Montbrun rushed to the towns aid and two inconclusive battles were fought in November. Cardé's forces took refuge in the town, and Gordes planned to besiege him, however before this could come to pass Mouvans and d'Acier came to Cardé's aid. Gordes was forced to conduct an embattled retreat harried on his way, until he at last felt confident in his strength and drew himself up near Lyon.

By now however the Protestant forces had disengaged from the chase and gone off to pursue other objectives. Moving back into Dauphiné, with the support of the baron des Adrets who had converted to Catholicism, he laid siege to the seigneur de Pipet. Pipet was able to withstand an assault by the combined forces, however he withdrew before a second attempt could be made, and most of his followers left with him. Turning his attention to Cardé, he seized Saint-Marcellin and Moras. Before the campaign could continue however, word came south that peace had been declared between Condé, who was besieging Chartres and the crown, bringing an end to hostilities.

Romans resisted the re-instatement of a garrison as part of the peace, fearful at the prospect of letting Adrets into their walls, Gordes arrived and was able to convince the town to take a royal governor.

=== Third war of religion ===
At the advent of the third war of religion, Joyeuse collaborated with Gordes in an effort to stop the Protestant forces from east of the Rhône joining up with the main southern Protestant force in Languedoc. They were unsuccessful in this attempt and the rebels were able to bring together a large army. Gordes deputised Adrets as colonel general of the Dauphiné infantry, and sent him to join forces with Anjou who commanded the main royal army. In 1569 Gordes command of Dauphiné was diluted, with instructions for him to give part of the territory being given to Maugiron to act as lieutenant-general in. This transfer did not take place however.

At this time Montbrun, and Lesdigiuères who had been fighting with the main Protestant force, and whose troops had been mauled at the Battle of Moncontour attempted to re-enter Dauphiné. Gordes brought forth forces to meet him as he crossed the Rhône. The battle did not go well for Gordes and he was forced to retreat, though Montbrun did not immediately follow. At this time Coligny, who was on his lightning march northwards passed through Dauphiné, Gordes dared not give battle but Coligny was not interested in conquering the region, desiring to move north towards Paris. Gordes contented himself with harassing Coligny's rearguard as he departed.

=== Edict of Saint-Germain ===
In July 1570 peace was finally established between the crown and the Protestant rebels. The Peace of Saint-Germain-en-Laye offered the most extensive provisions to the Protestant community of France since the Edict of January in 1562. Gordes was frustrated that the edict had been promulgated so quickly, arguing that it should be delayed until he could ensure that the Protestants of Dauphiné were disarmed and had been removed from the towns they had seized.

=== Massacre of Saint Bartholomew ===
As the Massacre of Saint Bartholomew spread into the provinces Gordes resisted the radical Catholic desire to introduce the massacre into his territory, waiting for clarification from the king as to his policy intentions. A small number of Protestants would however be killed in the town of Romans

== Reign of Henri III ==
In the wake of the massacres civil war would once more engulf France as La Rochelle refused to accede to its royal governor out of fear of his arrival being a prelude to massacre. The short civil war that followed saw the failed siege of La Rochelle before the election of Anjou persuaded the crown to seek peace. Gordes was once again tasked with ensuring the Protestant nobility of Dauphiné adhered to the more restrictive edict, using his 'prudence and wisdom.'

The following year Gordes organised a Catholic league in his province, comprising the nobility of Graisvaudan, and much of the urban elite of Grenoble. He leant on the city to fund the maintenance of an army of one thousand infantry and another hundred horse.

== Sources ==
- Baird, Henry (1880). History of the Rise of the Huguenots: Vol 2 of 2. Hodder & Stoughton.
- Harding, Robert (1978). Anatomy of a Power Elite: the Provincial Governors in Early Modern France. Yale University Press.
- Knecht, Robert (1998). Catherine de' Medici. Routledge.
- Roberts, Penny (2013). Peace and Authority during the French Religious Wars c.1560-1600. Palgrave Macmillan.
- Salmon, J.H.M (1975). Society in Crisis: France during the Sixteenth Century. Metheun & Co.
- Taulier, Jules (1859). Notice historique sur Bertrand-Raymbaud Simiane, Baron de Gordes. Impremiere Maisonville.
- Thompson, James (1909). The Wars of Religion in France 1559-1576: The Huguenots, Catherine de Medici and Philip II. Chicago University Press.
