= Georges de Schomberg =

French courtier

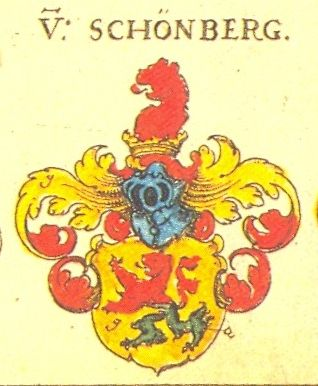
- Schomberg coat of arms
- Born: c. 1560
- Died: 27 April 1578 Paris
- Noble family: House of Schomberg
- Father: Wolf von Schönberg
- Mother: Brigitta von Schönberg

Georges de Schomberg (c. 1560 – 27 April 1578) was a French courtier, favourite and soldier during the French Wars of Religion. Born around 1560, Schomberg was the brother of the French soldier Gaspard de Schomberg, and participated in diplomatic missions with him. He accompanied the king's brother Henri III on a campaign in 1569, and joined with reiters under the comte de Bassompierre in late 1572. He travelled to the Commonwealth with Anjou after his election as king in 1573. In 1578 he fought for the duke of Guise in the famous Duel of the Mignons. During the combat, he squared off against Livarot and was able to deliver a nasty blow to his opponents head, however Livarot responded by stabbing him in the heart, and he died on the field.

== Early life and family ==
Georges de Schomberg was born around 1560, the son of Wolf von Schönberg and Brigitta von Schönberg.

Georges, and his brother Gaspard were originally of Saxon extraction. The family emigrated to France during the time of Georges' parents, and the children were born in France. His brother achieved naturalisation as a Frenchman in 1570, and fought the Ottomans in Hungary in 1566.

== Reign of Charles IX ==
During the 1560s, he served as a page to Catherine de' Medici, before accompanying Anjou, brother to the king, on his campaign against the Protestants in the third civil war. He joined the cavalry company of the reiters led by the comte de Bassompierre around this time.

He often accompanied his brother on diplomatic missions, as in the Autumn of 1572, when he and Gaspard travelled to the Commonwealth together.

In 1573, while conducting the siege of La Rochelle, Anjou was elected as king of the Commonwealth. Schomberg travelled with him to his new country, and served as a member of his household during his brief reign there, before his return to France on the death of Charles IX.

== Reign of Henri III ==
During 1577, Schomberg was a recognised member of Henri's entourage, and is recorded as one of his mignons by the contemporary memoirist Jules Gassot.

=== 'Duel of the Mignons' ===
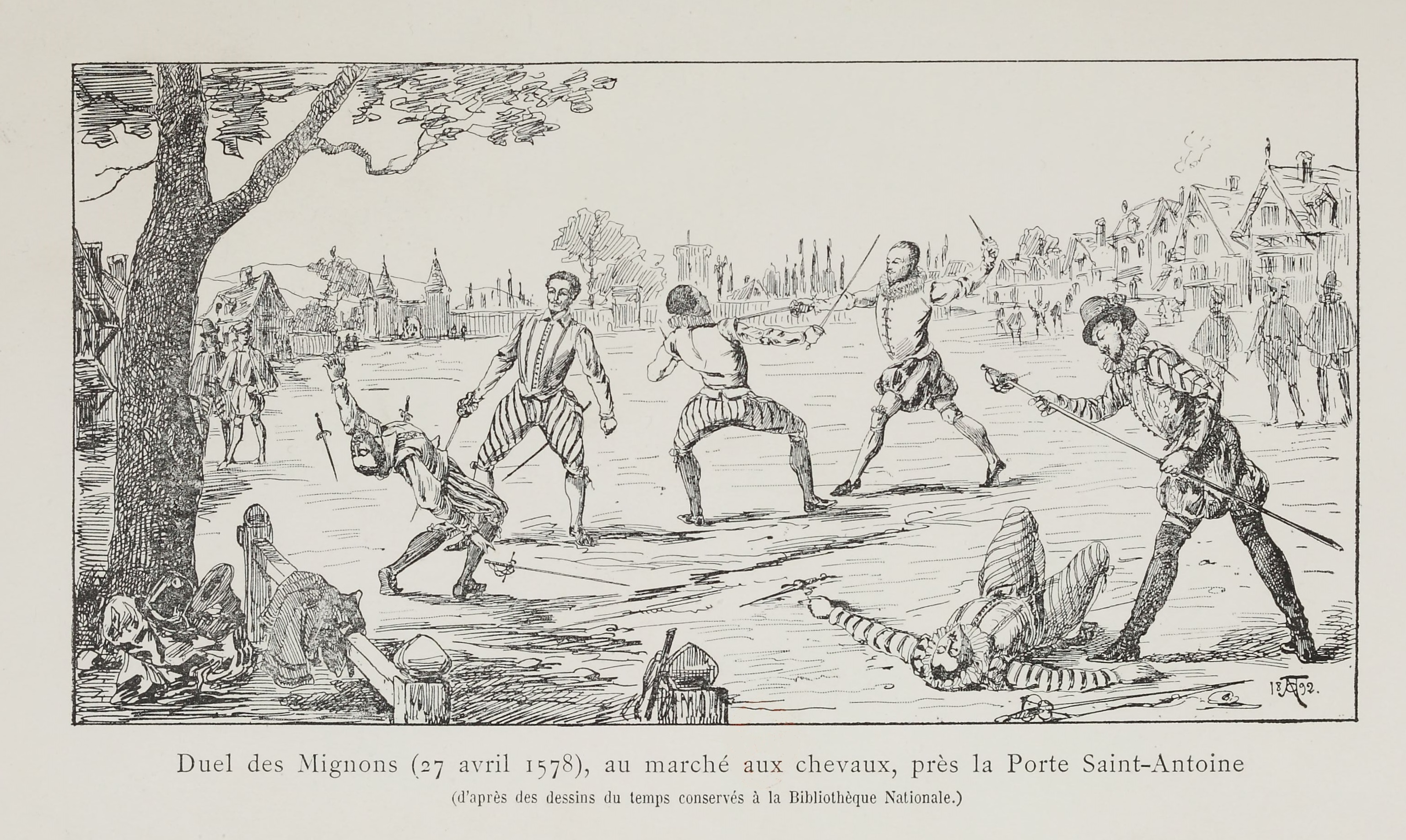
Nineteenth century interpretation of the fight

The favourites of Henri III, denied their target by the withdrawal of Alençon from court, turned their attention to the favourites of Henry I, Duke of Guise. At 05:00 on 27 April, the two sides met at the horse market, near the porte Saint-Antoine for an illicit duel. Caylus, favourite of the king was to face off with Entraguet. Each brought two seconds, Caylus bringing Maugiron and Livarot, while Entraguet brought Ribérac and Schomberg. The duel would represent the first time that seconds had participated in the fighting of a duel. The teams of men fought using rapiers, largely in silence. Schomberg was paired against Livarot and began by speaking to him 'They are fighting for their honour, what shall we do?' Livarot responded 'Let us fight for our honour too'. In the fight that followed, Schomberg was able to strike him hard on the head with his rapier, a wound for which Livarot would have to convalesce for weeks. Livarot returned the favour by delivering a strike to Schomberg's heart. The combat took the next three hours to conclude. Schomberg would die of the wound delivered to him by Livarot.

Of the six combatants, only two survived the encounter, Entraguet and Livarot. Contemporaries, such as François de la Noue denounced the duel for the senseless waste of life it cost.

== Sources ==
- Chevallier, Pierre (1985). Henri III: Roi Shakespearien. Fayard.
- Constant, Jean-Marie (1984). Les Guise. Hachette.
- Fraustadt, Albert (1869). Geschichte des Geschlechtes von Schonberg Meissnischen Stammes. Salzwasser-Verlag GmbH.
- Jouanna, Arlette (1998). Histoire et Dictionnaire des Guerres de Religion. Bouquins.
- Knecht, Robert (2016). Hero or Tyrant? Henry III, King of France, 1574-1589. Routledge.
- Le Roux, Nicolas (2000). La Faveur du Roi: Mignons et Courtisans au Temps des Derniers Valois. Champ Vallon.
