= Louis de Clermont, seigneur de Bussy =

French military governor

Louis de Clermont
- seigneur de Bussy d'Amboise
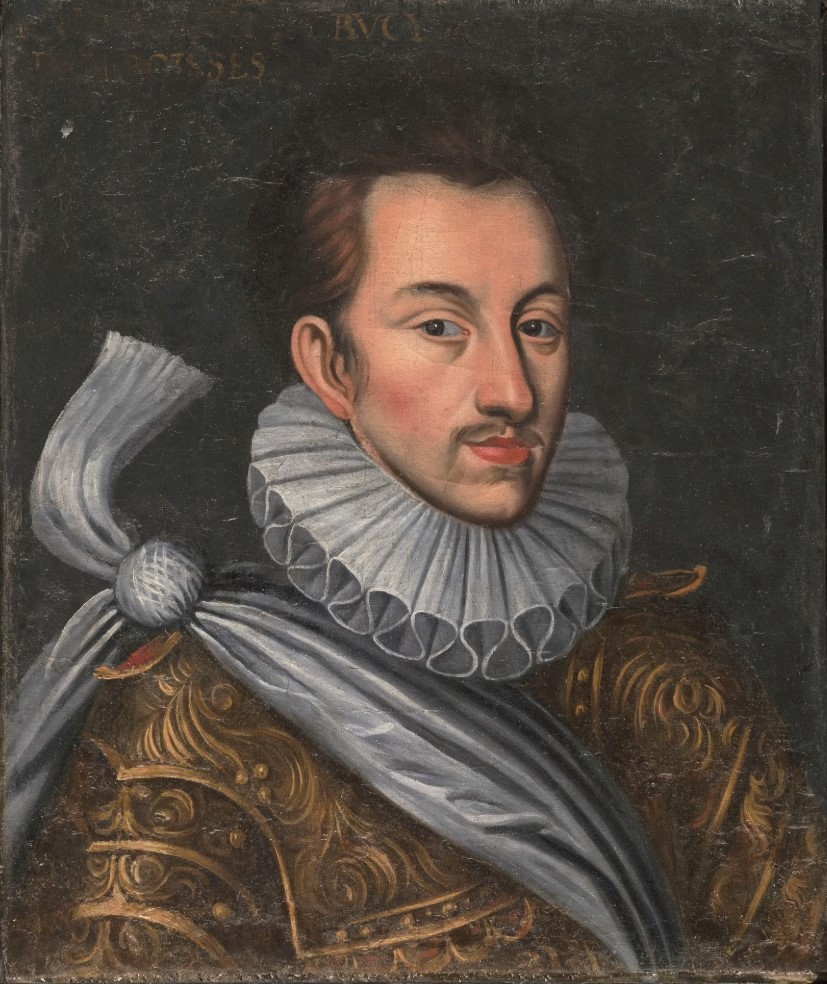
- Seventeenth Century portrait of Bussy in the Château de Bussy-Rabutin
- Born: c. 1549; Mognéville, Kingdom of France
- Died: 19 August 1579; Château de Contancière, France
- Family: House of Amboise
- Father: Jacques de Clermont
- Mother: Catherine de Beauvau

Louis de Clermont, seigneur de Bussy d'Amboise (1549–1579) was a noble, military commander and governor during the French Wars of Religion. His great-uncle was Georges d'Amboise, who was the primary adviser to king Louis XII, as a result he inherited a range of lands from his father. Entering politics in 1568, he led a company of men-at-arms in the third civil war. In 1574 he fought in the fourth civil war in Normandy and was rewarded for his service with the office of maître de camp and three more companies.

Bussy travelled with Charles IX's brother to the Polish-Lithuanian Commonwealth in 1574, getting himself into trouble en route for his sexual indiscretions, something that would become a hallmark of his career. The following year he aligned himself with Henri III's brother the Duke of Alençon in his opposition to the crown. Acting as a 'brave' he challenged the favourites of the king to combat on behalf of his benefactor, meanwhile he became romantically attached to Marguerite de Valois wife of the king of Navarre earning the ire of both the king and Navarre. Having stayed loyal to Alençon through the fifth war of religion, he received the benefits of the disloyal prince's victory, the governorship of his appanage of Anjou. His governorship was loathed by Protestants and Catholics alike, neither of whom could stand his harsh taxation, or disorderly troops.

Returning to court with Alençon in 1578 his skirmishes with the favourites of the king reached a fever pitch, with almost daily insults and fights, several times avoiding attempts to assassinate him by various members of Henri's inner circle. In February he helped Alençon flee from court, and assisted him in his plans to become the king of the Netherlands as they matured in the following months. In service of this venture Alençon made him commander of his military forces for the planned border crossing, however Alençon was warned off the venture by the queen mother and it did not materialise. By now Alençon saw his only path to kingship in the Netherlands to be through collaboration with his brother, as such he began to mend bridges with the king, necessitating the disposal of his much hated favourite Bussy. Bussy had at this time became infatuated with another married woman, and Alençon informed the king of this, who in turn informed the woman's husband that he could kill Bussy without fear of consequence. On 19 August 1579 after being invited to their castle under the false pretence of a rendezvous, Bussy was murdered.

== Early life and family ==
Louis de Clermont was born in Mognéville in 1549, the first son of Jacques de Clermont and Catherine de Beauvau. His father's uncle was the Cardinal of Amboise, principal minister of Louis XII. He left property to Jacques on condition his family adopt the name Amboise. The family owned seigneuries in Touraine, the Nivernais and Champagne.

Louis received a military education typical of a young gentleman of his standing.

== Reign of Charles IX ==
Bussy entered politics when he was granted a company of men-at-arms in 1568 leading them in the early wars of religion.

Bussy took advantage of the Massacre of Saint Bartholomew to prosecute his personal vendettas. His Protestant cousin the Marquis de Renel had come to the capital to prosecute a lawsuit against him. The chaos afforded him the opportunity to murder him with a dagger.

In the wake of the massacre the Protestant nobility entered rebellion once more. Bussy took part in the northern campaign in Normandie that culminated with the capture and execution of one of the leading rebels Gabriel de Lorges, Count of Montgomery. He received further promotion at this time, becoming maître de camp and receiving command of four companies.

=== Poland-Lithuania ===
In 1574, the king's brother Anjou secured an election as the king of the Polish-Lithuanian Commonwealth. Bussy travelled with him as he crossed Germany to secure his new throne. On his way Anjou passed through Frankfurt, but Bussy was unable to secure accommodation in the city with the king. He went out into the nearby villages, finding lodgings. He then seduced his hostess, and aroused the ire of the local population through his "French manners." The villagers beat him up; a local count arranged protective custody. Anjou secured his release so he could join up again with the main royal party.

== Reign of Henri III ==
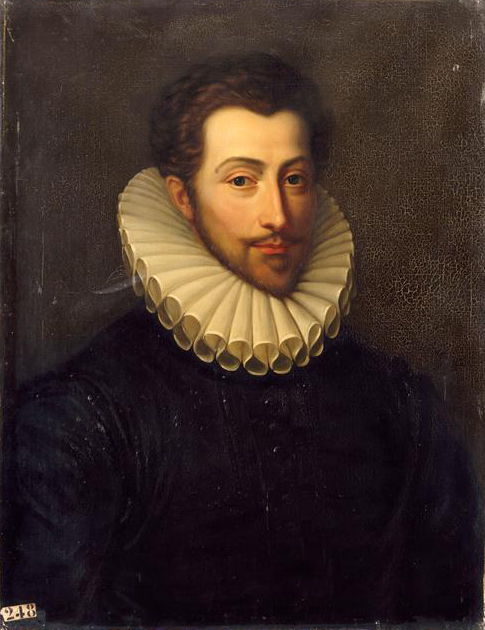
Portrait of Louis de Clermont, seigneur de Bussy d'Amboise by Édouard Pingret, 1835

=== Assassination attempt ===
By 1575, many Catholic nobles were disillusioned with the crown, forming an alliance with the Protestant nobility as the Malcontents. With this movement entering war against the crown, the king's brother Alençon saw advantage in providing the movement a royal figurehead. As a result, the king conscious of his brothers manoeuvrers maintained him at court in conditions approximating house arrest. At this time Alençon became close to Bussy, who was keen to fight with the king's favourites. Alongside his position as a 'brave' of Alençon, Bussy further aggravated the king through his relationship with Marguerite de Valois, the king of Navarre's wife. Bussy wrote many stanzas of poetry for his love. The king was not pleased with Bussy for his association with Alençon, and arranged for Louis de Béranger du Guast to kill him. Navarre for his part had one of Marguerite's filles d'honneur dismissed for acting as an intermediary between the queen and Bussy. Marguerite meanwhile spoke lovingly of Bussy in her memoires. On Henri's instruction, Guast secured the services of 12 men for his attack, and one night as Bussy was departing from the Louvre they fell upon him, but Bussy was able to evade their attacks. Frustrated in his attempt, the king turned on Marguerite for her extra marital relationship. Bussy meanwhile vowed to have his vengeance on his attackers, but was talked down and persuaded that it was in his interest to leave court for the moment, many young nobles followed him in his departure.

=== Governor ===
Bussy fought in Périgord during the fifth war of religion. The troops under his command lacked discipline, and hatched a plan to attack a company of allied German reiters, murdering and robbing the men. Their plot was uncovered, and the troops under his command were reorganised with the leading offenders dismissed from service. As a term of the peace, negotiated favourably for his patron, an Estates General was to be called. To choose delegates for the body, local meetings would select each regions candidates. While in most regions the roles would be dominated by Liguer deputies who despised Alençon's peace and wanted to see it overturned, in Vitry-le-François, Bussy d'Amboise, ensured for his patron that Liguer deputies were expelled from the candidate list. A further term of the peace granted Alençon the appanage of the Duchy of Anjou, to assist in the governance of this extensive holding Alençon turned to Bussy. Bussy, having arrived in November 1576, governed in a chaotic fashion, failing to provide pay to the soldiers under his command in the province, and allowing them to engage in atrocities around Le Mans in early 1577. Bussy imposed harsh taxation largely on his own personal authority. Receiving many complaints from Protestants and Catholics alike about Bussy's governance, Henri deputised Renaud de Beaune to investigate proceedings in the province. Sensing the mood at court, Bussy took the excuse to temporarily depart from the province, and Henri's representatives could do little to bring justice in the appanage.

=== War of the favourites ===
Returning to court, alongside his patron in January 1578 Bussy quickly got involved in almost daily scuffles and combats with the king's men. Several days after quarreling with Philibert de Gramont during a ball at the Louvre, Bussy marched on him with 300 supporters, travelling to the porte Saint-Antoine where he challenged Gramont, and the other favourites of the king to duel it out to the death. The king intervened, narrowly averting a pitched battle between the two sides, Gramont was frustrated by this intervention and attempted to attack Bussy in his lodgings. This too came to nought and both men were temporarily arrested, the king so vexed at these spats that he retired from public view for several days. Released in February, Caylus, Saint-Mégrin, Saint-Luc and François d'O ambushed Bussy at Saint-Antoine, but he was able to slip their grasp, angrily demanding justice from the king in response.

Frustrated by the reception he had received at court, Alençon decided to depart court again in February and instructed Bussy and his other favourites to join him in abandoning the king. Catherine de Medici, mother of the king, persuaded him to remain, but he remained frosty, refusing to attend the wedding of the king's favourite Saint-Luc. Attending the ball to celebrate the wedding later that night, another of the king's favourites, Louis de Maugiron took the opportunity to insult Alençon. Again deciding to leave, his followers were locked in the Louvre and Bastille. Urged on by his sister, Alençon offered an apology for his conduct, and that of his followers over the past months. As a result his favourites were released from their imprisonment, with Bussy and Caylus forced to embrace as a symbolic act of the reconciliation. The apology was not however genuine, and on 14 February Alençon snuck out of court, slipping out of a window, down to a horse where Bussy was waiting for him, together they fled towards Angers. Catherine pursued them, hoping to achieve a more real reconciliation, however they refused to see her. At this time Alençon made Bussy the 'first gentleman of his chamber'. In March after having briefly returned to Paris for some celebrations, Alençon laid out his demands for returning to the city, among them was a demand that Bussy, La Châtre and Simier be inducted into the conseil privé, the innermost royal council of decision making.

=== Apogee ===
Enjoying the peak of his favour, Bussy was granted the Abbaye de Bourgueil which brought him annual revenues of 18,000 livres, a sizable sum. He was further made command of Alençon's troops for his planned entry into the Netherlands, placing him in the position of organising further recruitment, though the prince would be dissauded from entering the country in force for the moment. He accompanied Alençon on his trip to Mons, a preliminary exploration for Alençon's ambitions to become king of the Netherlands. in August he and François de la Noue were dispatched to meet with William the Silent to discuss the religious situation in the Netherlands. Returning from the trip he continued his cavalier existence in Anjou, the population having despaired of achieving any successful royal intervention.

In his capacity as governor of Anjou, he was questioned by Catherine during the negotiations she was conducting with Navarre, as to what provisions for worship had been granted. The Protestants had complained that Bussy had provided for them the site of Baugé, which they felt was unsuitable. Though Bussy would not change the allocation, Alençon would grant an alternate site in 1581.

=== Fall from favour and murder ===
By 1579, his fortunes were changing. Alençon felt he needed his brother’s favour for his Dutch ambitions, and Bussy was an obstacle to any reconciliation. He increasingly found Bussy a patronising presence among his entourage, never having forgiven him for making fun of him during a friendly game. To dispose of him, Alençon provided evidence to the king that Bussy was now romantically pursuing the wife of the count of Montsereau. Henri in turn insinuated to the count that he would not face any royal opposition if he pursued vengeance against Bussy. To entrap the former favourite, Montsereau's wife, on instruction, pretended she was interested in Bussy coming to visit. On 19 August 1579, upon entering the château of Contancière with a friend for this 'illicit rendezvous', he was set upon by Montsereau's men and killed.

His governor responsibilities in Anjou would be inherited by another of Alençon's favourites, the sieur de Simier.

== In popular culture ==
Bussy d'Amboise is the hero of the play Bussy D'Ambois (1607) by English playwright George Chapman, written 20 years after d'Amboise's death. He is also the hero of the novel La Dame de Monsoreau by Alexandre Dumas, père.

== Sources ==
- Baird, Henry (1880). History of the Rise of the Huguenots: Vol 2 of 2. Hodder & Stoughton.
- Holt, Mack (2002). The Duke of Anjou and the Politique Struggle During the Wars of Religion. Cambridge University Press.
- Jouanna, Arlette (1998). Histoire et Dictionnaire des Guerres de Religion. Bouquins.
- Knecht, Robert (2010). The French Wars of Religion, 1559-1598. Routledge.
- Knecht, Robert (2014). Catherine de' Medici. Routledge.
- Knecht, Robert (2016). Hero or Tyrant? Henry III, King of France, 1574-1589. Routledge.
- Roberts, Penny (2013). Peace and Authority during the French Religious Wars c.1560-1600. Palgrave Macmillan.
- Salmon, J.H.M (1975). Society in Crisis: France during the Sixteenth Century. Metheun & Co.
- Wood, James (2002). The Kings Army: Warfare, Soldiers and Society during the Wars of Religion in France, 1562-1576. Cambridge University Press.
