= Henri Ébrard, Seigneur de Saint-Sulpice =

French noble

Henri Ébrard
- seigneur de Saint-Sulpice comte de Nègrepelisse jure uxoris
- Born: 1553
- Died: 20 December 1576, Blois
- Noble family: House of Ébrard
- Spouse: Catherine de Carmaing
- Father: Jean Ébrard, Seigneur de Saint-Sulpice
- Mother: Claude de Gontaut

Henri Ébrard, seigneur de Saint-Sulpice (1553 – 20 December 1576) was a French noble and favourite of king Henri III during the French Wars of Religion. Coming from a leading family in the Quercy, Saint-Sulpice's father, Jean Ébrard, Seigneur de Saint-Sulpice was a client of Constable Montmorency and then Catherine de Medici, serving as an ambassador and governor to the young prince Alençon, brother to the king.

In his father's capacity as governor to the prince he was raised alongside Alençon, and learnt the noble trades with him. In 1570 he formally entered the prince's household as a gentilhomme ordinaire. In 1572 the king made him a gentilhomme de chambre, inheriting his father's tenure in that office. He fought at the siege of La Rochelle during which his brother was killed. At this time the king's other brother Anjou, future Henri III began to draw him away from Alençon into his service. With Anjou's election as king of the Polish-Lithuanian Commonwealth later that year, he travelled with Anjou to the east. Through the intermediary action of Retz he became close to the king, and was made a gentilhomme de chambre in his capacity as king of the Commonwealth.

Upon his return to France, he fought in the fifth war of religion, as a commander in his father's ordinance company. He fought at the Battle of Dormans in which the duke of Guise vanquished a German mercenary force that had invaded the kingdom. Alençon was frustrated that Saint-Sulpice had defected from him, and tried to win back his favour through an appointment of Saint-Sulpice as his chamberlain, with an expanded income. In 1576 he led a company of light horse, subsidised by the king. That December an Estates General was held as a term of the Peace of Monsieur. Convinced to attend by François d'O, Saint-Sulpice was again propositioned by Alençon to return to his service, but he rebuffed the prince. A short while later, after a quarrel with one of Alençon's favourites, Saint-Sulpice was lured into a trap and murdered on 20 December.

== Early life and family ==
=== Family ===
The eldest son of Jean Ébrard, Seigneur de Saint-Sulpice and Claude de Gontaut, Henri was born in 1553.

Henri's family was among the most prominent in Upper Quercy. This was a region that was dominated by Protestant military leaders in the early religious wars that Henri desired more control over. Henri was cousin to Caylus, another favourite of king Henri III. The family was initially in Anne de Montmorency's network, through his position as governor of Languedoc. Henri's father finding himself involved in the negotiations for the Constable's release from captivity.

Henri's father Jean Ébrard, seigneur de Saint-Sulpice was one of the leading councillors of Henri III. He travelled with Catherine in her pacification mission to the south of France in 1579. During the 1560s, Catherine entrusted him with the role of serving as ambassador to Spain. In 1568 he was recalled from Spain to serve as Alençon's governor, providing him his education. This had the effect of tying the Saint-Sulpice family to Alençon. His maternal uncle was Marshal Biron, he supported his nephews rise at court.

=== Marriage ===
On 24 February 1576 Henri arranged a marriage between Saint-Sulpice and the wealthy heiress Catherine de Carmaing, comtesse de Nègrepelisse who held lands in the south west of France. To celebrate the marriage Jean provided his son a sizable income of 5000 livres. The marriage secured for Saint-Sulpice the county of Nègrepelisse, and tied him closely to the families of Carmaing and Foix Candale, the most prestigious families of the south west.

Caylus hoped to secure a marriage with a relative of Saint-Sulpice's, however his death during the 'duel of the mignons' would put an end to his ambitions of a Saint-Sulpice match.

=== Education and early career ===
The eldest son of Jean, Saint-Sulpice arrived in Paris in 1566, where he was inducted into the collège de Navarre. Introduced to the future Henri III that same year, he would receive his martial education under the tutelage of his father in the household of Alençon. Receiving training alongside the prince, it was expected that he and his brothers would keep the young man entertained.

== Reign of Charles IX ==
=== Alençon's service ===
He entered the household of his former playmate Alençon in March 1570 as one of his eight gentilhommes ordinaires. This office afforded him an income of 500 livres a year. In 1571 Saint-Sulpice attended his first ball, a mark of his aristocratic adulthood. During 1572 he was made a gentilhommes de la chambre by Charles IX, succeeding his father who had previously held the position.

=== La Rochelle ===
Alençon's elder brother Anjou targeted Saint-Sulpice, successfully peeling him off from loyalty to Alençon to make the young man one of his favourites in 1573. Marguerite de Valois described this process as a systematic effort. Le Roux highlights that this was a fairly simple process, as many of those in the households of Alençon and the king were fairly new to their positions, and service with Anjou afforded them the possibility of showing off and receiving promotion. Saint-Sulpice participated in the siege of La Rochelle in 1573, the city having entered rebellion in the wake of the Massacre of Saint Bartholomew. During the siege his brother was killed outside the walls of the city.

== Reign of Henri III ==
=== Commonwealth ===
Saint-Sulpice travelled with his new patron to the Commonwealth upon Anjou's election as king that same year, assuming a position within Anjou's household. Before departing Saint-Sulpice ensured that much of his wealth was converted into jewels, such that it could be more easily transported from France, to this end he bought a gold chain for 500 écus. At this time Saint-Sulpice was also close to Retz, and accompanied him when he provided private advise to the king, elevating his station at the Commonwealth court. Upon his return to France as king, Saint-Sulpice was one of those chief among his favour.

=== Fifth war of religion ===
During the fifth war of religion, Saint-Sulpice was not content to rest at court, and fought for the crown against the Malcontents. He was with Henry I, Duke of Guise during the campaign that culminated at Dormans as a commander in his father's ordinance company, alongside other favourites of the king. In the year 1575 Alençon elevated him to chamberlain of his household, in the vain hope the greater income of 600 livres could win the young favourite back to his household.

By 1576, the king had granted many of his favourites, including Saint-Sulpice a company of light horse. The king afforded each company 1600 livres.

Saint-Sulpice was one of the four favourites who were considered part of 'ma troupe' by Henri in March 1576, alongside D'O, Caylus and Saint-Luc.

=== Assassination ===
With the estates due to open in December, D'O strongly urged Saint-Sulpice to attend, arguing that it was good for him to make social displays. Saint-Sulpice arrived at court on 3 December with his father, and was warmly received by the king. He commentated on the friendly displays between the king and his brother, which he was encouraged to see. He was present during the opening of the Estates General and was impressed by the king's speech, describing it as 'spellbinding'. Alençon, also present, fruitlessly begged Saint-Sulpice to return to his service. Unsuccessful in this he put on a friendly façade for the young favourite, but secretly commissioned the vicomte de Tours to kill him. Saint-Sulpice had quarrelled with Tours after a game of Pall-mall during the proceedings of the estates with Saint-Sulpice accusing Tours of not being a gentleman. Though the tensions between them were initially calmed through the intervention of the duke of Aumale. This would not last however and, at 11pm on 20 December, after having attended a ball, he received an invite from the vicomte for what he assumed was a duel, on route to the location, he was ambushed outside the porte du Foy by several assassins who stabbed him with daggers, he died an hour later in his fathers arms.

The whole court was outraged at the murder, in particular Charles, Duke of Mayenne who vowed to revenge himself on the killer. His father pleaded for royal justice to be delivered against Tours, but the vicomte was able to escape. Jean had also promised a large income to Catherine on the event of her being widowed, and as such his finances were stretched providing her 20,000 livres and a further 10,000 livres worth of jewels. The king for his part, sympathetic to the situation gifted Jean 15,000 livres.

== Sources ==
- Chevallier, Pierre (1985). Henri III: Roi Shakespearien. Fayard.
- Holt, Mack (2002). The Duke of Anjou and the Politique Struggle During the Wars of Religion. Cambridge University Press.
- Jouanna, Arlette (1998). Histoire et Dictionnaire des Guerres de Religion. Bouquins.
- Knecht, Robert (2014). Catherine de' Medici. Routledge.
- Knecht, Robert (2016). Hero or Tyrant? Henry III, King of France, 1574-1589. Routledge.
- Le Roux, Nicolas (2000). La Faveur du Roi: Mignons et Courtisans au Temps des Derniers Valois. Champ Vallon.
- Salmon, J.H.M (1975). Society in Crisis: France during the Sixteenth Century. Metheun & Co.
- Sutherland, Nicola (1962). The French Secretaries of State in the Age of Catherine de Medici. The Athlone Press.
