= Louis de Bérenger =

French noble (c. 1540–1575)

- sieur du Guast
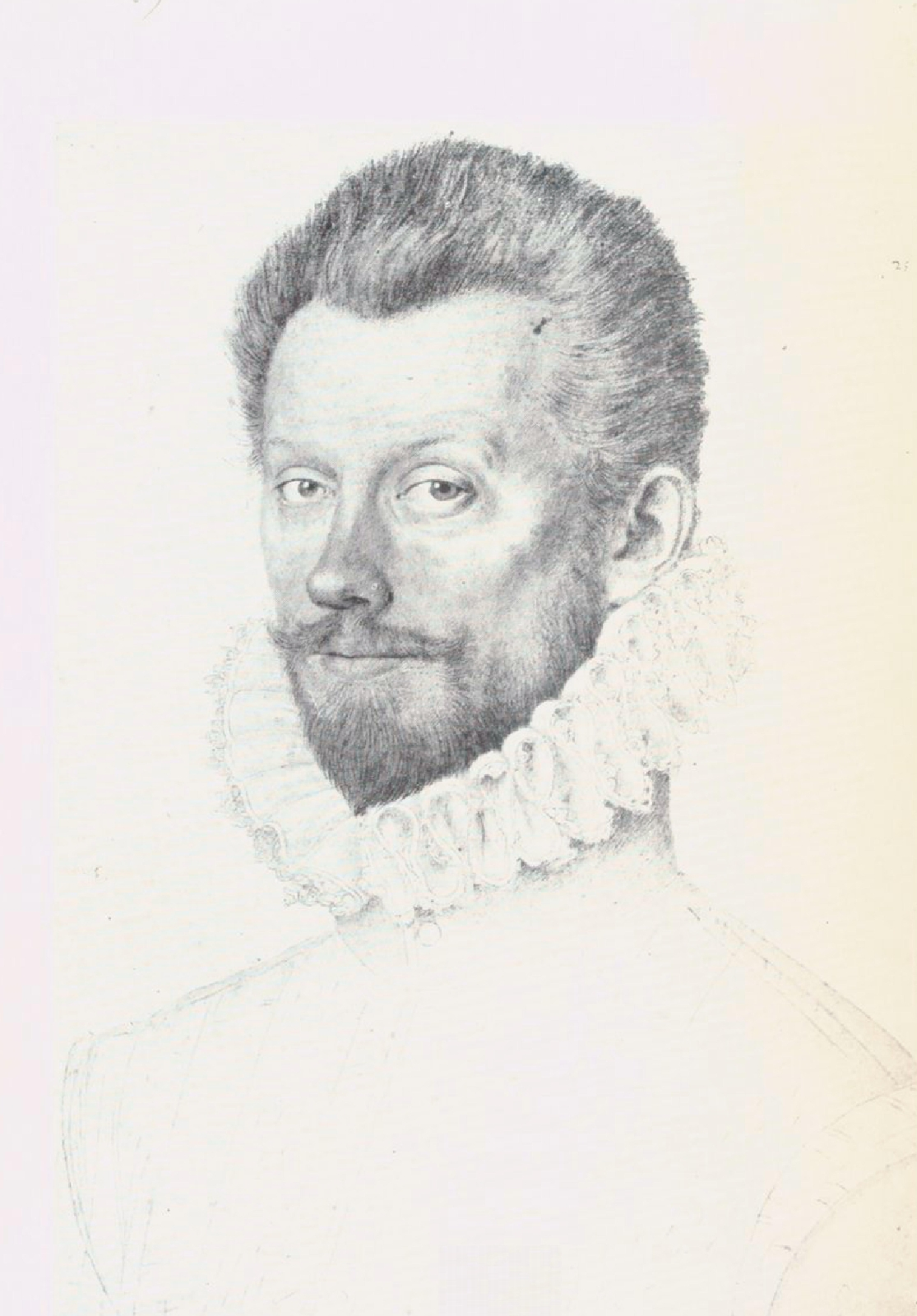
- Portrait of Du Guast
- Born: c. 1540
- Died: 31 October 1575

Louis de Bérenger, sieur du Guast (c. 1540– 31 October 1575) was a French noble and early favourite of king Henri III during the French Wars of Religion. Having fought in the latter Italian Wars under Marshal Brissac he achieved prominence in court in 1569, when he was subject to the attentions of the acclaimed poet Pierre de Ronsard. The following year he was elevated to a gentleman of the chamber in the entourage of Henri, the who was then the Duke of Anjou as younger brother of king Charles IX. It was with the king's brother that he participated in the assassinations that prefigured the Massacre of Saint Bartholomew. In the civil war that followed he would command a company of infantry during the siege of La Rochelle, during which he received a severe wound to his arm in an assault.

With his patron Anjou's election as king of the Commonwealth, Du Guast travelled with his lord to the east. While in the country during Anjou's brief rule he found himself overshadowed by Bellegarde, Anjou's new closest favourite, finding himself forced to compete with Bellegarde for the position of Colonel-General of the infantry. News of the king's death in France, caused Anjou to flee the Commonwealth to take the 'more valuable' throne. Du Guast travelled back with him and spent time with the now king Henri III during his walks in Lyon. Du Guast was granted a large monetary gift from the king in early 1575 and superseded Philippe Strozzi as commander of the French guard. Du Guast at this point found himself frustrated with the king's sister Margaret of Valois, who had rebuffed his advances. Resultingly he informed the king of her affair with the seigneur de Bussy, chief among the king's brothers' favourites. Henri instructed Du Guast to kill Bussy, and he arranged an attempt while Bussy was departing from the Louvre. Du Guast and twelve other men jumped on him, but Bussy was able to evade their attacks, swearing vengeance for the attempt. Du Guast was now tasked with ensuring that the king's brother did not escape court to set himself up with the rebels in the provinces as their leader. Du Guast recommended to the king locking Alençon in the Bastille but the king refused. After Alençon's escape the civil war began to look up for the king, with the Duke of Guise's victory at the Battle of Dormans. Du Guast warned the king of the risks of allowing the duke to overshadow his achievements, and persuaded the king to not seek peace and keep fighting for victory so he could surpass Guise in achievement. On 31 October 1575 Du Guast was assassinated in his home by a group of men led by Vitteaux, a client of Alençon's.

== Early life and family ==
A noble of Dauphinois extraction, Du Guast was born around 1540.

Known for his roving romantic attentions, Du Guast started an affair with Françoise Babou de La Bourdaisière, wife of Antoine d'Estrées.

The historian Pierre Chevallier describes Du Guast as a man whose 'insolence was matched only by his delight for mockery'. This was the opinion of the contemporary historian de Thou, who charged Du Guast with a penchant for treating the high nobles of the court as his social inferiors.

== Reign of Henri II ==
During the latter Italian Wars, Du Guast served in Italy under the command of Marshal Brissac.

== Reign of Charles IX ==
As early as 1569 Du Guast had achieved prominence at court, as evidenced by the verse written concerning him by Ronsard. In 1570, Du Guast was elevated to the position of 'gentleman of the chamber' for the king's brother Anjou. His patron in this powerful prince's court was at first Albert de Gondi.

=== Massacre of Saint Bartholomew ===
Du Guast was thus already among the entourage of Anjou in 1572, and as such participated alongside his lord in the execution of the kill lists, that would spiral out of control into the Massacre of Saint Bartholomew. Du Guast headed to the rue de Béthisy where he had been instructed to hunt down and kill a Protestant captain named Charles de Baumanoir.

=== La Rochelle ===
The following year, while conducting the siege of La Rochelle, Du Guast who had accompanied his lord participated in the assaults. Du Guast held authority over an infantry regiment for the conduct of the siege. During one attempt on the bastion de l'Évangile which guarded the north approach to the city, Anjou reported to the king that Du Guast had been wounded. Du Guast had received a serious wound to the arm which made it non functional. As the siege dragged on, Anjou was elected as king of the Commonwealth affording him the opportunity to bring the inconclusive siege to a close. While Anjou was keen to free himself of many of his mother's advisers, he established for himself a circle of favourites he could be sure were his men to accompany him on the journey. Among those men were Du Guast. During the king's time in the Commonwealth he increasingly elevated Roger de Saint-Lary de Bellegarde as chief among his favourites. Du Guast was among those favourites frustrated by the attentions bestowed upon Bellegarde, and competed with the future Marshal for the privilege of the position of 'Colonel-General of the Infantry'. Upon learning of his brother's death, Anjou returned to France as king Henri III. He made his entry into the country at Lyon where he stayed for a while. During his stay he was ever surrounded by those who had been close to him in the Commonwealth, d'O, Caylus, Entrangues, and Du Guast, who often walked the streets with him.

== Reign of Henri III ==
=== Favourite ===
Henri was keen to reward his favourites for their loyalty to him. As such in March 1575 he secured the sum of 50,000 livres from the Châtelet of Paris to provide as a gift to Du Guast. Du Guast was also rewarded with the regiment of guard formerly commanded by Philippe Strozzi, he quickly reworked the composition of the company installing many other nobles who had accompanied Henri to the Commonwealth to replace the old leadership. It became apparent to the king that to secure his position on the throne, he would need to marry quickly. While Catherine hoped he would marry Elizabeth I, Henri demurred, preferring Louise de Vaudemont, who Catherine found an unsatisfactory candidate. Catherine feared that this would connect the king too closely to the Guise family, however when the Cardinal de Lorraine the closest tie of the Guise to Louise died in December 1575 she lifted her objection. Henri dispatched Cheverny and Du Guast to Nancy to propose the match to her and ask for her hand. Louise was already on the road travelling to Henri's coronation, so Cheverny and Du Guast met her on route and she provided her assent.

=== Fifth civil war ===
Disillusionment with the crown had by this point reached many Catholic notables, among them members of the House of Montmorency. As such with civil war resumed in 1575 Damville joined the Protestants in rebellion. The king's brother Alençon saw advantage to himself in this war, and as such aligned himself as a potential figurehead for the rebel movement. With Alençon's return to court, Du Guast was tasked with detaching Alençon's favourites to bring them into the king's circle. Du Guast insinuated to the king, that if it was his will, he would kill his brother for him. The king would commission him to assassinate Bussy, one of Alençon's closest favourites who had started an affair with the king's sister. The affair had come to the king's attention through du Guast, who, rejected by the queen with his advances had told Henri of her affair. He and 12 other assassins lay in wait as Bussy departed from the Louvre one night and fell upon the young noble. However he failed in this attempted assault, and Bussy would evade the assassins, continuing his affair. Bussy vowed that he would have vengeance for the attempt, but for the moment this was left unsated. It was Du Guast who had the responsibility of preventing Alençon's potential flight from court, a task in which he failed when the prince slipped out of the capital in September 1575. Several hours before Alençon snuck out of his quarters, du Guast having been informed that an attempt might be made by the prince, told the king that he should secure his brother in the Bastille. In October the duke of Guise repelled the vanguard of a Protestant mercenary army that was attempting to enter France during the Battle of Dormans. The queen urged Henri to use the victory as a path to a favourable peace. Du Guast however countered that the king could not allow the duke to gain all the credit for victory, and that the king needed to provide a triumph of his own to boost his reputation.

=== Assassination ===
On 31 October 1575, Du Guast was at home, having his toenails clipped by a servant, when a gang of assassins burst into his residence. They quickly descended upon the favourite, stabbing him to death. Left to bleed out, Du Guast informed those who came to his side that among those who had ambushed him was the baron de Vitteaux, one of Anjou's clients. The Parisian diarist, whose work provides considerable information about Henri's favourites, L'Estoile, opined that he was murdered due to his contempt for Alençon. Meanwhile the contemporary historian de Thou argued that he was killed due to having antagonised the great nobles of the court, by treating them as his social inferiors.

After the assassination of du Guast, the king was distraught at the loss of one of his closest favourites. In response he composed 'elegiac verses' to commemorate his friend. Henri gave him a grand funeral at Saint-Germain l'Auxerrois, however he made no effort to prosecute the assassins.

== Sources ==
- Chevallier, Pierre (1985). Henri III: Roi Shakespearien. Fayard.
- Harding, Robert (1978). Anatomy of a Power Elite: the Provincial Governors in Early Modern France. Yale University Press.
- Knecht, Robert (2014). Catherine de' Medici. Routledge.
- Knecht, Robert (2016). Hero or Tyrant? Henry III, King of France, 1574-1589. Routledge.
- Le Roux, Nicolas (2000). La Faveur du Roi: Mignons et Courtisans au Temps des Derniers Valois. Champ Vallon.
- Salmon, J.H.M (1975). Society in Crisis: France during the Sixteenth Century. Metheun & Co.
