= François d'Aydie =

French noble, courtier and favourite of Henri III

- vicomte de Ribérac
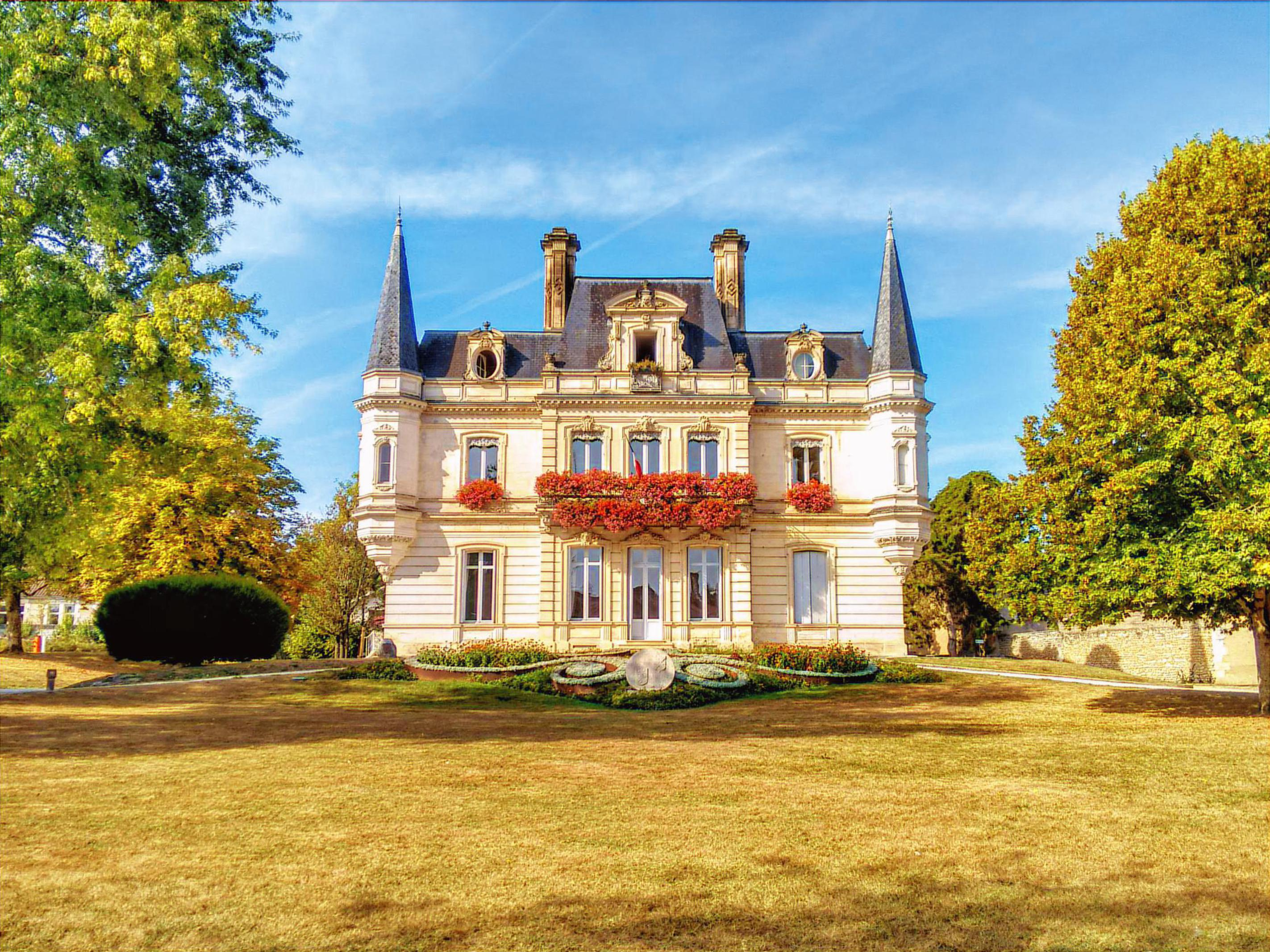
- Town hall of Ribérac
- Born: c. 1550
- Died: 29 April 1578, Paris
- Noble family: Maison d'Aydie
- Father: Guy d'Aydie
- Mother: Marie de Foix

François d'Aydie, vicomte de Ribérac (c. 1550 –29 April 1578) was a French noble, courtier and favourite of Henri III and the duke of Guise during the French Wars of Religion. The son of Guy d'Aydie and Marie de Foix, Ribérac enjoyed a highly prominent position among the nobility of south west France. During the reign of Henri III he arrived at court and was among those favoured by the king, who financially supported his mother, afforded his clients offices and elevated to him a position in his household as gentilhomme ordinaire de la chambre.

On 28 April 1578, after having successfully harried Alençon from court, he affiliated himself with the duke of Guise in the confrontations between the favourites of court that followed. During the famous Duel of the Mignons he fought as a second for Entraguet, favourite to Guise against Caylus, Maugiron and Livarot for the king. In the combat that followed he faced off against Maugiron, and killed the favourite, but fell forward onto his opponents sword. Pulled from the field, he died the following day at the hôtel de Guise.

== Early life and family ==
A member of a nobless seconde family, the Aydie were not a new presence in court life during François' life. The family had served the crown for a century before his arrival at the court. His great-grandfather Odet II d'Aydie had served as Chambellan to Louis XII.

Born around 1550, François d'Aydie, was the son of Guy d'Aydie and Marie de Foix. His father served Henri served at the siege of Metz and as a commander of infantry at the disaster of Saint-Quentin. He was elevated as a chevalier de l'Ordre de Saint-Michel. His mother meanwhile was from one of the most prominent noble families of south west France.

After his arrival at court, he took up residence on a street popular among the favourites of Henri in March 1578 rue Saint-Thomas-du-Louvre. Present nearby was the future governor of lower Normandie François d'O and the king's valet Pierre du Halde.

== Reign of Henri III ==
=== Favourite ===
As of at least 1576, Ribérac had received appointment as a gentilhomme ordinaire de la chambre for the king, granting him an elevated degree of access to the king's person in private settings. This allowed him access to royal favour and he ensured Henri intervened to appoint a client of his as prior of Saint-Jacques de Mons. The king further afforded his mother a gift of 1000 écus on 21 March 1578.

In popular pamphlets that circled in Paris, the favourites of court were derided. In one Ribérac was dismissed as a fool.

With the departure of Alençon from court, Henri's favourites turned to a new target, and began jockeying with the favourites of the duke of Guise. They started campaigning for Henri to transfer the title of Grand Maître from Guise to Caylus.

=== Duel of the Mignons ===
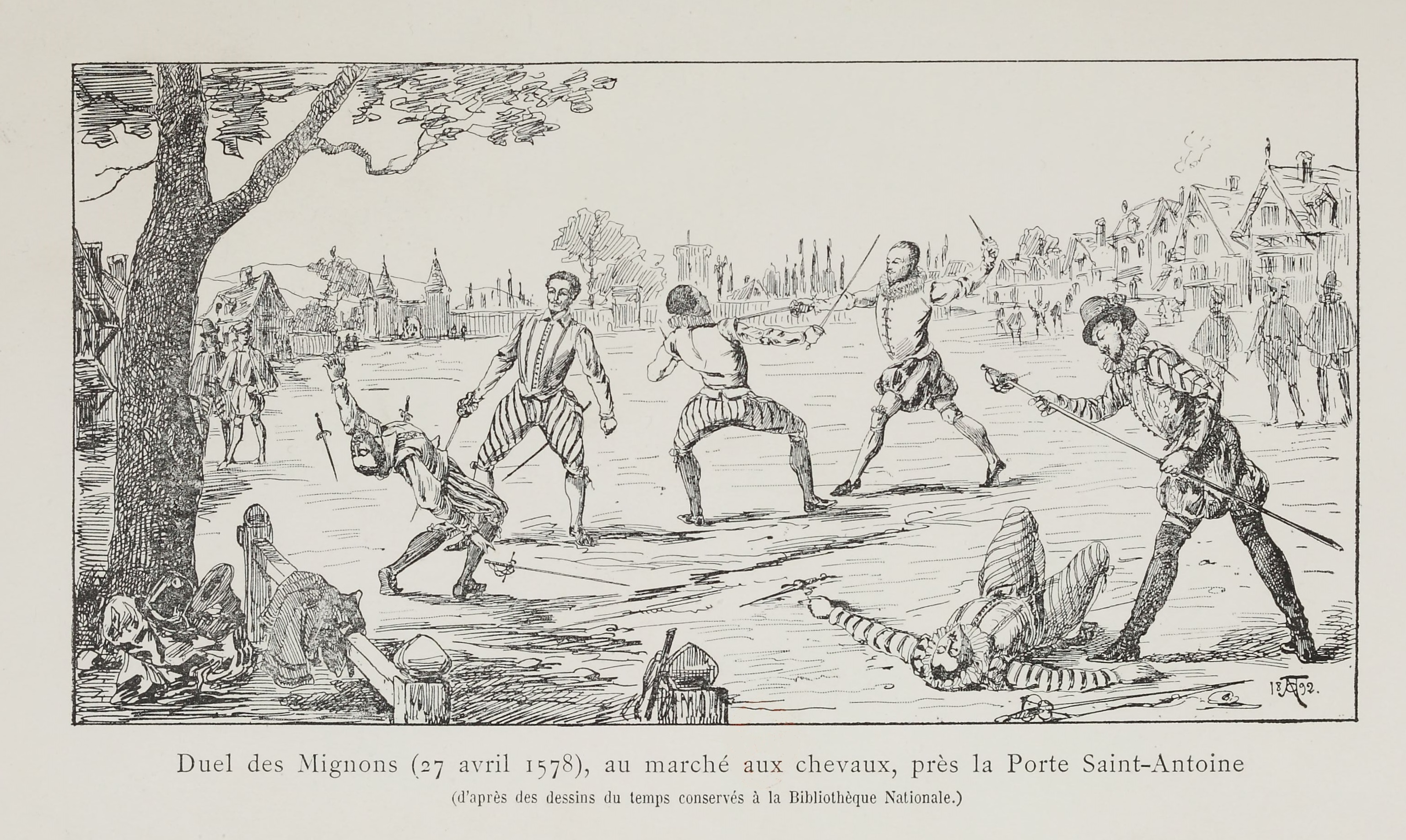
Nineteenth century engraving of the duel

At 05:00 on 27 April, Caylus arrived to duel with Entraguet at the Porte Saint-Antoine near the horse market. Caylus brought with him two seconds, Maugiron and Livarot, while Entragues brought Schomberg and Ribérac for his part. According to the contemporary writer Brantôme, the dispute had arisen over the affections of a woman. For the first time in French history the seconds for both sides would participate in the duel that followed. The men fought largely in silence with their rapiers. At the opening of the duel, Maugiron had called out to Ribérac that they were to fight each other. Ribérac thrust at Maugiron, sending Maugiron falling backwards dead, however Ribérac was unable to steady himself and fell forward onto the sword of his deceased opponent. Only Livarot and Entraguet would survive the encounter. Ribérac was not killed immediately on the field, and the duke of Guise took him to his residence, the hôtel de Guise where he convalesced for before expiring at noon the following day.

The duel was denounced by contemporaries as a senseless waste of life.

== Sources ==
- Cloulas, Ivan (1979). Catherine de Médicis. Fayard.
- Chevallier, Pierre (1985). Henri III: Roi Shakespearien. Fayard.
- Constant, Jean-Marie (1996). La Ligue. Fayard.
- Jouanna, Arlette (1998). Histoire et Dictionnaire des Guerres de Religion. Bouquins.
- Knecht, Robert (2016). Hero or Tyrant? Henry III, King of France, 1574-1589. Routledge.
- Le Roux, Nicolas (2000). La Faveur du Roi: Mignons et Courtisans au Temps des Derniers Valois. Champ Vallon.
