= Louis de Maugiron =

French courtier and noble

- marquis de Saint-Saphorin
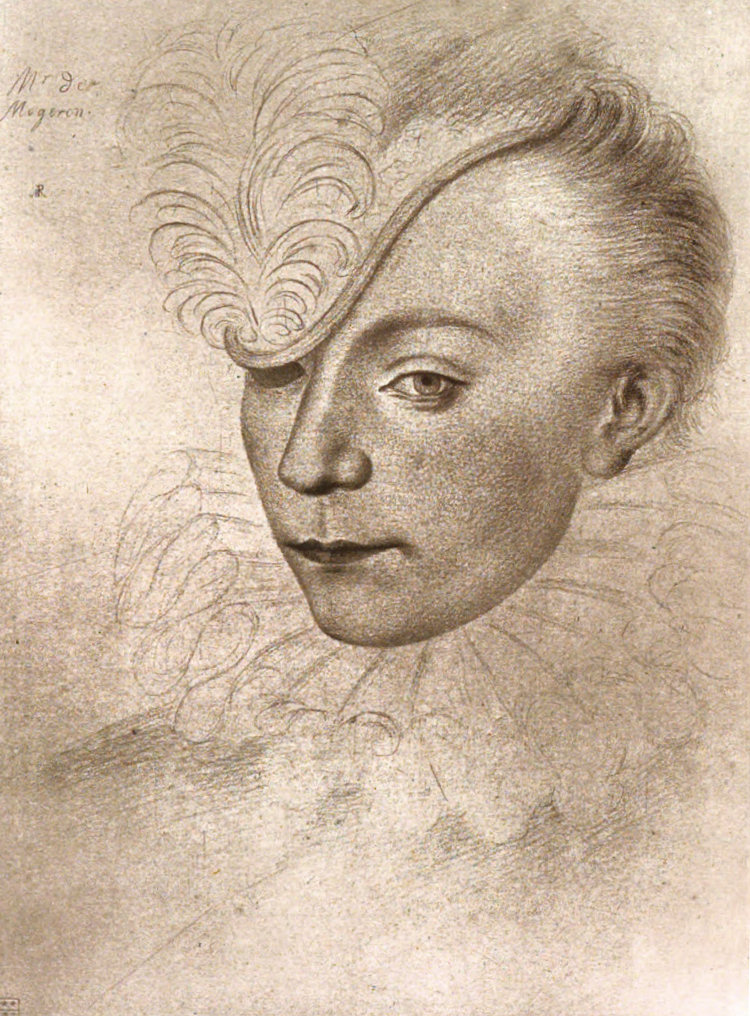
- Sketch of Maugiron, drawn after the loss of his eye in May 1577
- Born: 1560
- Died: 27 April 1578, Paris
- Noble family: House of Maugiron
- Father: Laurent de Maugiron
- Mother: Jeanne de Maugiron

Louis de Maugiron, marquis de Saint-Saphorin (1560 - 27 April 1578) was a French courtier and noble during the French Wars of Religion. Louis was the son of Laurent de Maugiron, a key power broker in Dauphiné who became lieutenant-general of the province in 1578, and held the position until his death. Louis entered the service of the king's brother Alençon in 1576, securing the position of 'chamberlain of affairs' the most senior position in the household despite only being sixteen. The king recognised that he was a valuable figure to secure, and as such peeled him off from his service of Alençon into his own service, granting him the role of gentilhomme de la chambre du roi that same year, doubling his income. After the Peace of Monsieur broke down and civil war resumed, the young Maugiron fought in the campaign led by Alençon, seeing combat at the capture of La Charité-sur-Loire and Issoire. At the latter engagement, he received an arrow through his eye during an assault, causing him to lose the eye.

Alençon who had been avoiding court, decided to return in 1578. He and his favourites spent the next month engaged in skirmishes with the favourites of Henri III. Maugiron, now representing the king harassed his former patron, leading a legal case against one of his favourites, La Châtre and insulting the prince during a ball in early February. Several days later Alençon declared his intention to depart court, and eventually succeeded in doing so. No longer having the king's brother's favourites to intimidate, Maugiron and the other clients of the king turned their attention to those loyal to the duke of Guise and were narrowly kept away from a duel on 2 April 1578, before engaging in one on 27 April under the respective leaderships of Caylus for the king and Entraguet for the duke. During the combat that followed, Maugiron fighting as a second for Caylus was killed by one of Entraguet's seconds, Ribérac. The king was distraught at the death of Maugiron and Caylus, and commissioned an elaborate tomb for his favourites. The tomb was destroyed by a Parisian mob in 1589 at the urgings of radical Catholic preachers.

== Early life and family ==
Louis de Maugiron was from a prominent noble Viennois family. His father Laurent de Maugiron, served as lieutenant-general of Dauphiné from 1562 to 1564 and then from 1578 to 1589. He was a close fidèle of Catherine de' Medici. Laurent married his cousin Jeanne de Maugiron, and the two had seven children of whom Louis was the oldest, born in 1560. Laurent's sister, also named Jeanne married Jean d'Arces, and together they would have Guy d'Arces, baron de Livarot who would also become a favourite of Henri III.

== Reign of Henri III ==
=== Alençon ===
Maugiron first met the king and his brother in November 1574 while the court was passing through Vienne. Introduced to the court by Alençon, in 1576 Maugiron received an appointment as Alençon's chamberlain of affairs. Only sixteen years old his appointment to this most prestigious role in Alençon's household is a testament to the favour he enjoyed. This role granted him an income of 800 livres. Though young he was not without family allies at court, including the comte de Suze who was governor of Provence in 1578. Captain Roussillon was responsible for ensuring Maugiron's family back in Dauphiné were kept appraised of developments concerning the young man. Targeted by the king as a useful client, he was detached from service to the prince, and became a favourite of the new king. That same year he received the office of gentilhomme de la chambre du roi. Combining his incomes from the king and his brother, he now received 1200 livres in total.

=== Sixth civil war ===
During the sixth civil war, he fought under the command of Alençon, who was leading the royal army, at the capture of La Charité-sur-Loire and Issoire, during the latter of which he lost an eye in May. Maugiron had been participating in an assault on the town when an arrow pierced his eye. After this incident he was nicknamed 'le brave borgne'. Soon after the cities capture the campaign would stall out for lack of funds, and peace was agreed.

=== Favourite against favourite ===
At this time the king's sister Marguerite de Valois alleges that Henri's favourites constituted an informal parallel royal council, separate to the formal conseil des affaires, in which Maugiron was consulted on matters of state among others. In her memoires she compares this alleged council to that of Jeroboam, who was supposedly counselled by unworthy men. Her memoires are treated cautiously by modern historians, and Le Roux argues only a few of Henri's favourites began to exercise influence on administrative affairs. The relations between the king and his brother were toxic by the time of the prince's return to court in 1578. Maugiron, keen to represent his patron took the opportunity of Alençon's presence at a ball for the wedding of one of the king's favourites, Saint-Luc, to insult his former protector. Maugiron and Saint-Luc had previously pursued legal proceedings against one of Alençon's favourites, La Châtre as a way of attacking the king's brother. The following day Alençon decided to flee court, and while this plan was at first frustrated, he escaped on 14 February.

=== 'Duel of the Mignons' ===
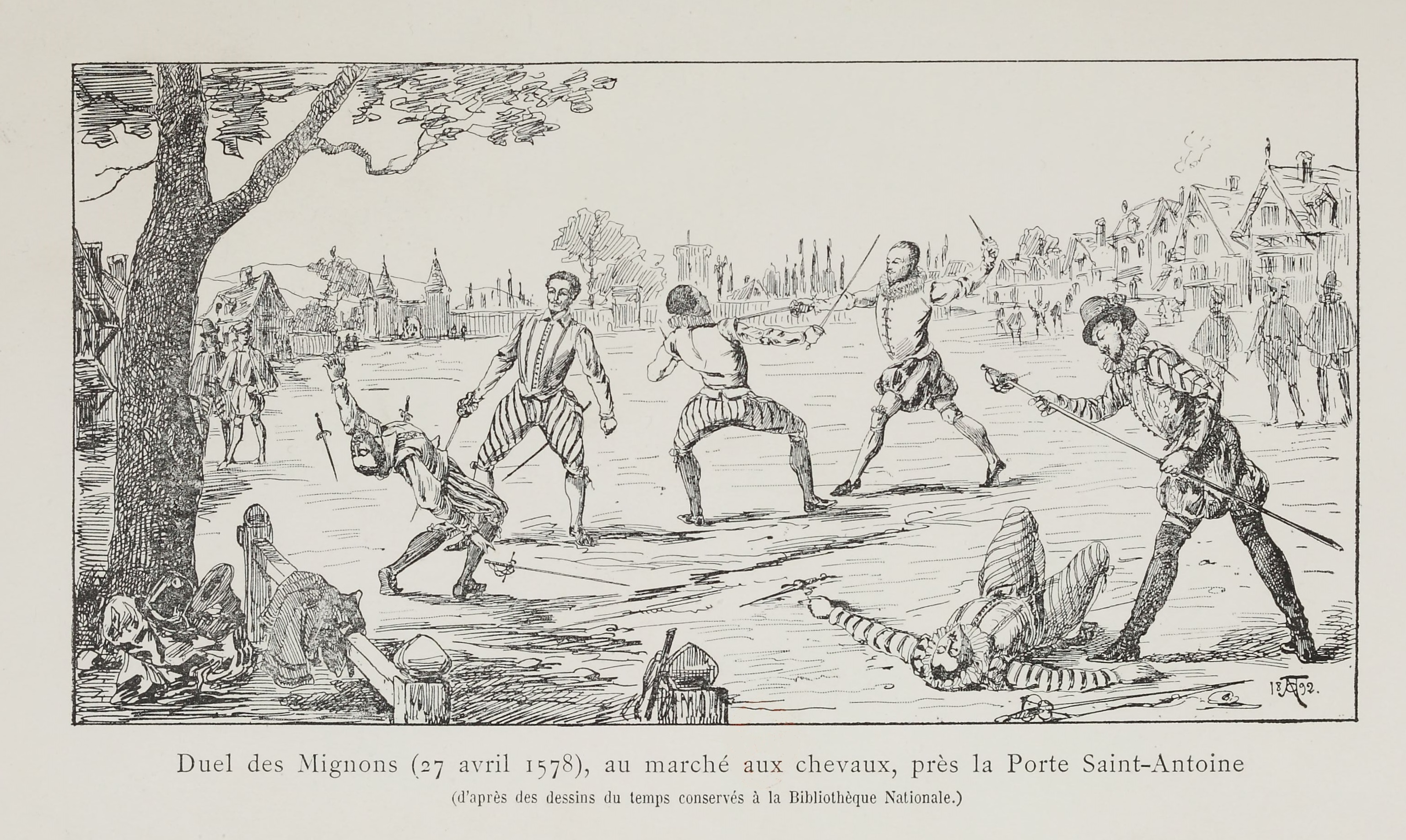
Nineteenth century interpretation of the fight

Rid of their enemy, the remaining favourites in the capital turned their attentions on the duke of Guise, persuading the king to remove the honour of grand maître from him, in favour of Caylus. The two sides, led by Gilles de Souvré and La Valette, first almost came to blows in a dispute over the love of a woman on 2 April, however the king was able to intervene and calm the two sides down. However, at 5am on 27 April a duel took place between Caylus for the king and Entraguet for the duke of Guise, with Maugiron and Livarot as seconds for the former and Ribérac and Schomberg as seconds for the latter. The two parties met at the horse market near Porte Saint-Antoine. To avoid further royal interference, great discretion was taken in ensuring the preparations were undertaken in secret. Unusually for duels at the time the seconds were involved in the fighting. During the combat that followed Maugiron was killed in a sudden thrust from Ribérac's sword however as he fell backwards Ribérac unable to stop himself landed on the dead Maugiron's sword. Maugiron's death was quick, unlike that of his first, Caylus who lingered for a month. Livarot took a blow to the head and convalesced for six weeks before recovering. Schomberg was also killed instantly during the combat, while Ribérac died the following day. Only Entraguet walked away with a simple scratch to the arm. Brantôme wrote that the duel was ultimately about the love of women as opposed to the grand maître title.

The king was distraught at the loss of Maugiron and Caylus. This loss was compounded a little while later with the assassination of another of his favourites, Saint-Mégrin. He commissioned the poet Pierre de Ronsard to write verse for the men. At court he treated the deaths as those of a prince of the blood, receiving the courts condolences. Arnauld Sorbin, who had given the sermon at the death of Montmorency and the king's brother Charles IX was tasked with overseeing the funerals. The sculptor Germain Pilon was commissioned to create an elaborate tomb for the favourites, he fashioned large sarcophagi from black marble, with a kneeling figure reading from a book of hours on the top. Henri wrote to Maugiron's father, expressing the devotion he had felt towards his son, explaining the circumstances of his death and assuring Maugiron that he had died honourably. Laurent had already received letters from his son's allies at court, Roussillon and Suze.

After his death his two brothers, Thimoléon and Scipion de Maugiron would both receive the honour of becoming a gentilhomme de la chambre, the former in 1582 and the latter in 1585. While Henri had planned to place Maugiron in a position of authority in his home province of Dauphiné, his early death in 1578 destroyed such plans.

=== Legacy ===
Contemporaries deplored the pointless nature of the violence that had unfolded, with three of the participants dead or dying by the conclusion of the engagement. La Noue described the engagement as senseless. Brantôme by contrast praised the bravery and good combats of many of the figures of court. Describing those such as Maugiron as valiant and noble. After the king ordered the assassination of the duke of Guise in December 1588, an angry crowd of Parisian Catholics, at the urgings of their preachers, took their anger out on the tombs of the favourites, destroying all three. Excising them from Saint-Paul the crowd grumbled that the rightful resting place of the men was on a gibbet, not in a sacred place. In the wake of the duel Pasquinades were circulated in the city implying that Henri's favourites had 'unorthodox morals'. The relationship between Caylus and Maugiron was implied to be homosexual by the polemicists of Paris, however no such evidence of this exists from the time. L'Estoile who collected the polemics he found on the streets of Paris found many Tombeau verses dedicated to Maugiron, which characterised him and the other courtiers of Henri as dishonest, dirty and immoral.

== Sources ==
- Cloulas, Ivan (1979). Catherine de Médicis. Fayard.
- Chevallier, Pierre (1985). Henri III: Roi Shakespearien. Fayard.
- Jouanna, Arlette (1998). Histoire et Dictionnaire des Guerres de Religion. Bouquins.
- Knecht, Robert (2016). Hero or Tyrant? Henry III, King of France, 1574-1589. Routledge.
- Le Roux, Nicolas (2000). La Faveur du Roi: Mignons et Courtisans au Temps des Derniers Valois. Champ Vallon.
