= Laurent de Maugiron =

French military commander and lieutenant-general

- Comte de Montléans
- Other titles: Knight of Saint-Michel; Lieutenant-General of Dauphiné
- Born: c. 1528
- Died: c. 1589; Vienne, Kingdom of France
- Spouse: Jeanne de Maugiron
- Issue: Louis de Maugiron
- Father: Guy de Maugiron

Laurent de Maugiron, comte de Montléans was a French military commander and lieutenant-general of Dauphiné during the Italian Wars and French Wars of Religion. Beginning his career during the reign of Henri II he fought at the defence of Metz in 1552, and in the Picardie campaign of 1554. With peace declared in 1559, he returned to Dauphiné, where he worked with the lieutenant-general La Motte Gondrin, in his attempts to stamp out Protestantism in the region.

In April 1562 civil war broke out, and La Motte Gondrin was killed by the rebels under the baron des Adrets. Maugiron found himself promoted to lieutenant-general of the governorship and for the next few months fought a losing battle trying to contain Adrets, before giving up and retreating into Burgundy to link up with Tavanne's forces. Together they achieved more success, capturing Mâcon and Vienne before being drawn away to fight in the northern campaign, serving with distinction at Dreux.

In the peace that followed, Maugiron found his promotion to be ephemeral, and when the court was able to in 1564 he was replaced as lieutenant-general of Dauphiné by the baron de Gordes. Despite this, the two worked together during the second civil war, forcing the Protestants out of Vienne and defeating them shortly thereafter. In the third civil war he fought with the main royal army at the victories of Jarnac and Moncontour.

A perpetrator of the Massacre of Saint Bartholomew he found himself again a royal lynchpin in Dauphiné as royal authority collapsed in the late 1570s, utilising local urban rebellions to his own ends to cement royal control over a greater degree of the territory. In 1578 he was made lieutenant-general of Dauphiné for a second time. In 1589 he died.

== Early life and family ==
The second son of Guy de Maugiron, Laurent was born in 1528. He was initially destined for a career in the church and was tonsured in 1539 by the bishop of Vienne.

In 1550 he married his cousin Jeanne de Maugiron. Together they had eight children, the eldest of whom Louis de Maugiron, became a favourite of Henri III.

== Reign of Henri II ==
With the resumption of the Italian Wars in 1551, Maugiron fought in Lorraine, assisting in the defence of Metz under the command of François, Duke of Guise. In 1554 he was among the first to attempt to enter the breach of the citadel of Dinant under Gaspard II de Coligny's direction. His attempt would be repulsed but the citadel would fall within the next few days. In August 1554 his elder brother was killed and he inherited his lieutenancy of 50 lances. The following years he fought under the command of Brissac and then Antoine, Count of Clermont.

In 1557 he was elevated to the honour of gentleman of the chamber of the king.

== Reign of François II ==
With the sudden advent of a new king's reign, Maugiron took the opportunity to seek satisfaction for a feud he had with another captain, Rance. The king however denied the request and praised both of them for their services to the crown. In the following years Maugiron and La Motte Gondrin worked to crush the nascent Protestant movement in Dauphiné. He was granted the role of sénéschal in July 1561 to this end.

== Reign of Charles IX ==
=== Outbreak of civil war ===
In April 1562 the lieutenant general of Dauphiné and acting governor, in the absence of the duke of Guise, La Motte Gondrin was assassinated. Maugiron was selected as his replacement in a commission on 2 May 1562. In the letter charging him he was urged to punish the principle perpetrators, and bring the country of Dauphiné which was falling to rebels as the country fell into civil war, back into obedience with the crown. He was a fidèles of the Guise and represented their interests in the province. He linked his forces in the province up with those under Nemours with the hope of re-capturing the city of Vienne, which had been seized by the rebel baron des Adrets. Assembling before Grenoble in June he entered the town in force on 14 June 1562 after the surrender of the town to him.

=== Decline of fortunes ===
This would represent the highpoint of his success in the early months, and Adrets was able to reverse this capture, his much larger force seizing Grenoble on 26 June. Maugiron hastily retreated through the lands of the duke of Savoy up into Burgundy where Tavannes was having more success. In September the two commanders stormed Mâcon. They pursued the Protestants southwards towards Lyon before Tavannes was relieved of his command in favour of Nemours. Together their forces now numbered 20,000 and they attempted to capture Lyon, the city however proved resilient and they were unsuccessful. Failing in this they turned back to Maugiron's original objective, that of Vienne, which they entered at the end of September. In late October he bested a smaller force of Adrets, killing several hundred men and forcing him to retreat to Lyon. As the year came to a close his forces were called north to the main royal army, and for his services during the Battle of Dreux he would be granted a company of soldiers.

=== New governor ===
With the Assassination of the Duke of Guise (1563) in February 1563 at the siege of Orléans, Catherine appointed Charles, Prince of La Roche-sur-Yon as governor of Dauphiné and confirmed Maugiron's lieutenant generalcy. In March he besieged Grenoble. Having hoped to gain entry via the betrayal of the gates, he was disappointed, and upon hearing of the approach of forces under Antoine de Crussol he burned the suburbs of the town and retreated. After another unsuccessful attempt to capture Lyon the war was brought to a close with the Edict of Amboise. While he was urged to enforce its terms in his territory, the crown informed him there were several hold out Protestant controlled settlements they would like to see reduced and he was urged not to disarm before Lyon and Valence had returned to obedience.

=== Peace of Amboise ===
To achieve the subjugation of Vienne, Maugiron and Nemours had promised the Protestants of the town that they would have continued practice of their religion in the city. However the Edict of Amboise offered no such provisions for Vienne, as such Maugiron was informed by François de Scépeaux that the edict overrode any promises he might have made.

=== Demotion ===
During the royal tour of France, the court passed through the governorship of Dauphiné, with Maugiron receiving the collar of the Order of Saint-Michel in August 1564. The following month he was replaced as lieutenant general by the baron de Gordes, Maugiron was reduced to the governorship of the town of Vienne, the court hoping the honour of the order would make the pill easier to swallow.

=== Second civil war ===
Despite his demotion when civil war broke out again in 1567 he served the crown loyally, assisting in the defence of Lyon from an attack by troops under Paul de Mouvans. Unable to seize the city the Protestant rebels attacked Vienne instead, capturing the city in short order. Maugiron darkly threatened the Protestants of Vienne, threatening them that he would kill the Protestants of Lyon if they mistreated the Catholics of the town. Nemours and Gordes pressured them to withdraw from the town in November, and Maugiron joined with them to defeat the Protestant force at Saint-Marcellin on 14 November. Their army was too weak to maintain itself in Dauphiné and fell back to Lyon, they then proceeded north to link up with the army under Anjou, seizing Mâcon again before linking up with him.

=== Third civil war ===
During the third civil war Maugiron would serve during the battles of Jarnac and Moncontour. In November 1568 Maugiron was confirmed in the roles of sénéschal of Valentinois and Diois by the new governor of Dauphiné Montpensier. In September 1569 the king assembled a collection of towns and declared it a new county, awarding the territory of Montléans to Maugiron. The approach of Coligny on his march north through the country forced Gordes and Maugiron to retreat from an attempt to capture a fort on the Rhône.

During the Massacre of Saint Bartholomew, Maugiron was tasked with killing Protestant leaders in the Saint-Germain-des-Prés region of Paris including Montgommery, however he would be unsuccessful in murdering this target.

== Reign of Henri III ==
After spending some time out of royal favour, in 1578 he was granted his old position of lieutenant-general of Dauphiné once more and thus acting governor in the absence of Montpensier, by king Henri III. In 1579 unrest was bubbling in Dauphiné, with the third estate upset about the tax arrangements that currently favoured the nobility. Catherine visited the region and in front of the estates gave a speech in favour of the current arrangement. She instructed the body to be obedient to Maugiron, the third estate promising to do so. Maugiron proceeded to harness a peasant army that was currently active, having risen up in Romans against their oligarchical administration, under the commander Paulmier. He granted them permission to attack Châteaudouble which was held by a local warlord, which they successfully reduced before going on to capture Roissas, the stronghold of another warlord. In 1580 Paulmier's luck would run out and he would be killed in a counter-coup by the bourgeois of Romans.

On 5 February 1589 he died in the town of Vienne, and his body was buried at the Cathedral Saint-Maurice.

== Sources ==
- Diefendorf, Barbara (1991). Beneath the Cross: Catholics and Huguenots in Sixteenth-Century Paris. Oxford University Press.
- Harding, Robert (1978). Anatomy of a Power Elite: the Provincial Governors in Early Modern France. Yale University Press.
- Jouanna, Arlette (1998). Histoire et Dictionnaire des Guerres de Religion. Bouquins.
- Knecht, Robert (1998). Catherine de' Medici. Routledge.
- Salmon, J.H.M (1975). Society in Crisis: France during the Sixteenth Century. Metheun & Co.
- Terrebasse, Humbert (1905). Histoire et généalogie de la famille de Maugiron, en Viennois, 1257-1767. L Brun.
- Wood, James (2002). The Kings Army: Warfare, Soldiers and Society during the Wars of Religion in France, 1562-1576. Cambridge University Press.
