= Battle of Dormans =

1575 battle in the French Wars of Religion

- Part of the 5th War of Religion in France
Date	10 October 1575
Location	Near the village of Dormans, on the Marne
Result	Catholic victory

Belligerents
Catholics	Huguenots / Protestants

Commanders and leaders
Henry I, Duke of Guise	John Casimir of the Palatinate-Simmern

Strength
10,000	4,500 – 6,000

Casualties and losses
50	50

The Battle of Dormans was fought on 10 October 1575, during the fifth War of Religion in France, between the armies of Henry I, Duke of Guise (i.e. Catholics) and the Huguenots recruited German army of John Casimir of the Palatinate-Simmern (i.e. Protestants).

Guise brought about 10,000 men to the battle, facing 4,500 - 6,000 Huguenots and Germans.

During the battle, the Duke of Guise was wounded in his face, which gave him the nickname "Le Balafré". According to Penny Richards: "This scar and this name, with which he was thereafter frequently depicted, contributed to his legendary reputation". Both sides lost no more than 50 men.

Though the Duke of Guise achieved a victory at Dormans, in its aftermath, he was unable to break through the defences of François de Montmorency. The fifth war concluded with the Edict of Beaulieu in May 1576.

== Bibliography ==
- Campbell, Gordon, ed. (2003). "Wars of Religion or (French) Guerres de Religion". The Oxford Dictionary of the Renaissance. Oxford University Press.
- Richards, Penny (2016). "Warriors of God: History, Heritage and the Reputation of the Guise". In Munns, Jessica; Richards, Penny; Sprangler, Jonathan (eds.). Aspiration, Representation and Memory: The Guise in Europe, 1506–1688. Routledge. ISBN 978-1317178033.
- Thompson, James Westfall (1909). The Wars of Religion in France, 1559-1576: The Huguenots, Catherine de Medici, and Philip II. University of Chicago Press.506
