= Bernard de Nogaret =

French military officer, courtier and statesman (1553–1592)

- seigneur de La Valette
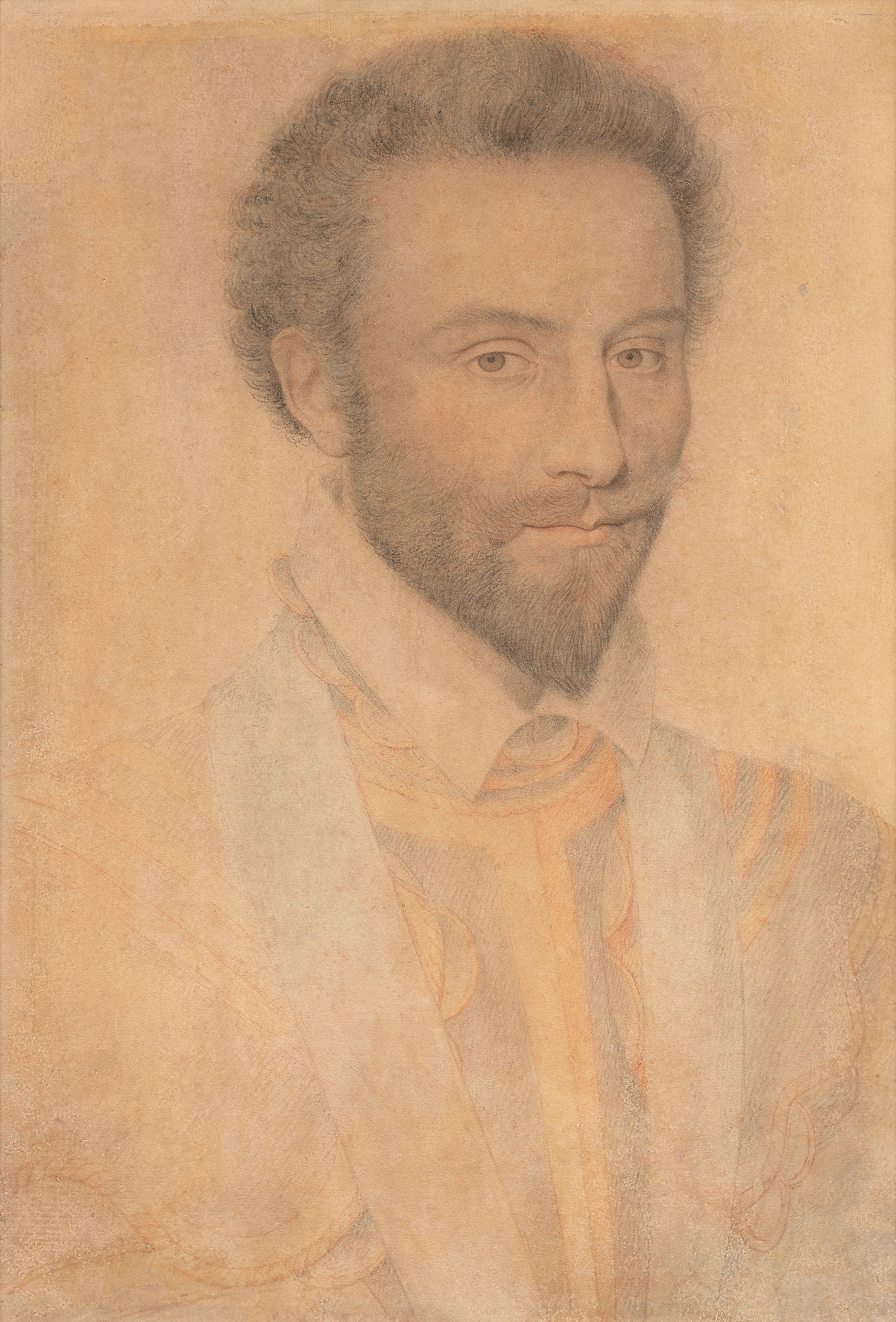
- Portrait by Pierre Dumonstier, 1584-1585
- Born: 1553
- Died: 11 February 1592 (aged 38–39); Roquebrune
- Noble family: Maison de Nogaret
- Spouse: Anne de Batarnay
- Father: Jean de Nogaret
- Mother: Jeanne de Saint-Lary

Bernard de Nogaret, seigneur de La Valette (1553 – 11 February 1592) was a French governor, military officer, favourite, courtier and statesman during the latter French Wars of Religion. The eldest son of Jean de Nogaret and Jeanne de Saint-Lary, La Valette was born into a provincial noble family on the rise, his father elevating himself to lieutenant-general of Guyenne during his lifetime. La Valette received his first military service in 1570 under his father at Arnay-le-Duc before being introduced to the future king Henri III at the siege of La Rochelle in 1573. Unlike many other favourites of Henri, the Nogaret family would become close to the king late, and it was not until 1579 that La Valette began to enjoy the fruits of favour, when upon the death of Marshal Bellegarde Henri selected him to assume the governorship over Saluzzo and French Piedmont. By 1580, La Valette was among those in the king's inner circle with whom he travelled on private retreats. In 1582 he became Chambellan to the king, and then a member of the exclusive conseil des affaires. Henri planned further advancement for him with receipt of the provincial governate of the Lyonnais, however this would not materialise. In 1584 the king's brother Alençon died, and the prospective succession of the Protestant Navarre motivated the reformation of the Catholic ligue which successfully forced Henri to renounce Navarre's succession and make war on Protestantism. La Valette was established in Dauphiné to lead the fight against the Protestant commander Lesdiguières. The lieutenant-general of Dauphiné Maugiron allied with him in this fight, and resigned his charge as lieutenant-general to him in 1587.

That year the duke of Joyeuse was killed at Coutras, and La Valette's younger brother Épernon became governor of Normandie. Thereafter he ceded his authority as governor of Provence to La Valette, though La Valette would not formally assume the charge of governor until 1590. Bellegarde would also be killed during the battle, and La Valette became maître de camp of the light cavalry. The disgrace of Épernon and La Valette had by now become central objectives to the ligue, and after the humiliation of the king during the Day of the Barricades, he was compelled to disgrace Épernon by the ligueurs. Épernon agreed to cede his authority as governor of Provence and Admiral to his brother, and was replaced as governor of Normandie by the duke of Montpensier. Around this time La Valette entered alliance with his former enemy, Lesdiguières to protect his families position in Provence. In September, while the Estates General of 1588, another concession to the ligue, was in session, the duke of Savoie invaded and occupied Saluzzo with little resistance. At the Estates, Guise moved to have Épernon and La Valette declared heretics in league with Navarre, however this failed. This humiliating attempt however further convinced Henri of the necessity to assassinate the duke of Guise. With the duke killed much of France rebelled against Henri, including the major cities of Provence. The duke of Savoie allied with the ligue for an invasion of France proper, and had considerable success despite losing a battle to La Valette and Lesdiguières. Shortly before the Estates General closed, it compelled Henri to divest La Valette of the office of Admiral, which he ceded to Beauvais-Nangis in February. On 2 January 1590, Navarre, now styled Henri IV after the murder of Henri III appointed La Valette formally as governor of Provence. He would die on 11 February 1592 of wounds sustained while besieging the ligueur held town of Roquebrune.

== Early life and family ==
=== Parents and siblings ===
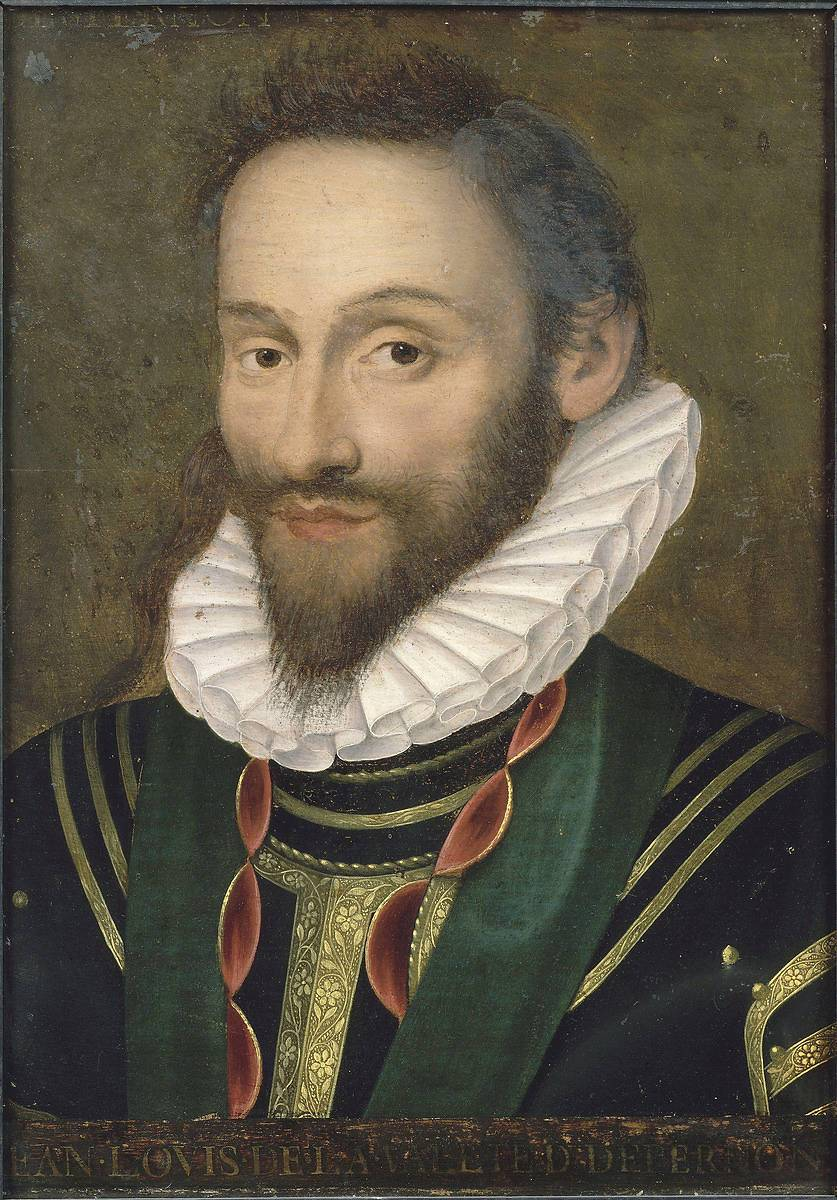
Seventeenth-Century Portrait of Jean-Louis de Nogaret

Bernard de Nogaret was born in 1553 the eldest son of Jean de Nogaret and Jeanne de Saint-Lary. Jean brought the noble family up from a situation of relative poverty to prominence, serving as maître de camp of the royal light cavalry, and then being named lieutenant-general of Guyenne in 1574, one year before his death. His mother Jeanne meanwhile was the sister of Marshal Thermes and daughter of Pierre de Saint-Lary the lieutenant-general of Comminges. His younger brother Jean Louis de Nogaret, known as 'Caumont' prior to 1582 would become a paramount favourite of Henri III. He also had three sisters, all younger: Catherine de Nogaret, Hélène de Nogaret and Anne-Marie de Nogaret.

The Nogaret family were relatively recent arrivals to nobility, having been ennobled in the latter parts of the fourteenth century. They would claim more prestigious origins, asserting that they were the descendants of the chancellor of Philippe IV, Guillaume de Nogaret, however this is unproven.

=== Early years ===
The early years of Bernard's life were spent at the family seat of Caumont.

After some years, Bernard and Jean-Louis were dispatched by their father to Paris, where they studied at the Collège de Navarre from 1567 before military events terminated their education. The family lands having been devastated by Protestant forces in early 1570, Jean called both of them back to provide him military support. The two would serve under their father at the Battle of Arney-le-Duc that year.

=== Marriage ===
On 13 February 1582, La Valette was married to Anne de Batarnay, aunt of the king's other paramount favourite Joyeuse. The marriage contract had been drawn up only two days prior. By this means Henri sought to tie together the network of favourites that he had built around himself, however his two chief favourites would remain rivals. On the occasion of the marriage, the king awarded him a gift of 200,000 livres, the payment of which was staggered over the next years. Anne received a gift of 100,000 livres concurrently, which the family quickly converted into land purchases.

Henri had decided on the marriage at the same time as he arranged the marriage of Henri de Batarnay, comte de Bouchage to Catherine de Nogaret. At the ceremony itself Henri took the place of the brides father, as Anne's father had died 2 years previously. Anne received jewels from Catherine de' Medici, presented to her at the wedding by madame de Combault. The newlyweds were escorted to bed by Henri, Louise de Lorraine, his queen and Catherine. Henri greeted them again the following morning while they were resting. Contemporaries were surprised at the 'relative modesty' of the ceremony, in contrast with the grandeur that would accompany Joyeuse's.

Bernard and Anne would have a very close marriage despite the great difference in their respective ages. Bernard wrote in letters of his 'dear lover', meanwhile Anne fretted when Bernard was out on campaign that some harm might come of him. Anne would predecease her husband by a year, dying in 1591.

== Reign of Charles IX ==
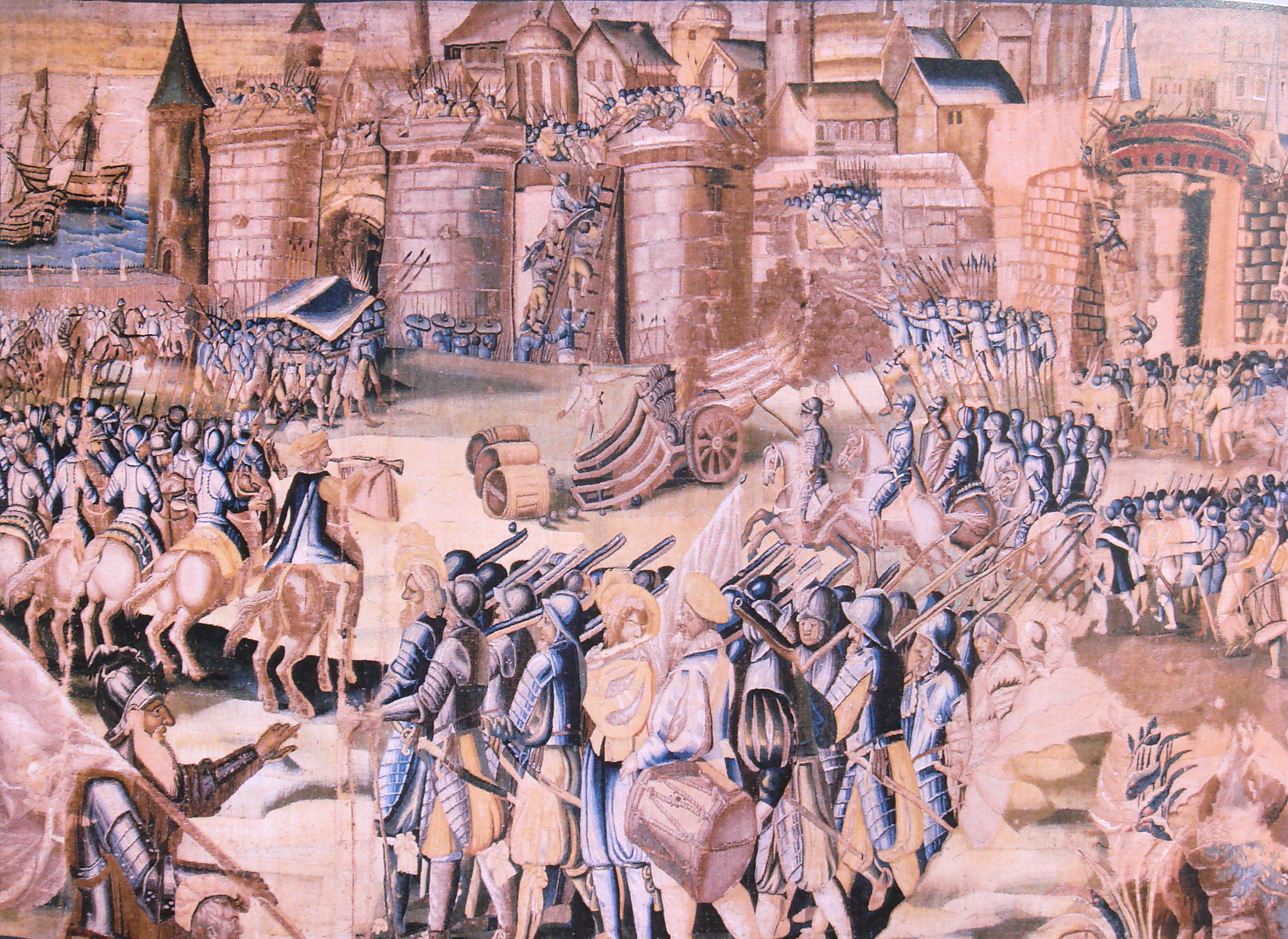
Siege of La Rochelle at which the Nogaret brothers were introduced to Anjou, brother to Charles IX who would rule as Henri III

La Valette and his brother were present at the siege of La Rochelle in 1573, the crown having dispatched the brother to the king, Anjou to lead the siege effort in the hopes of bringing the city back into obedience. At the siege the two brothers were introduced to Anjou by the duke of Guise. The family would however get off to a poor start with the future king, due to the relationship Caumont had established with the Protestant king of Navarre, a distant cousin of Charles IX and the first prince of the blood.

== Reign of Henri III ==
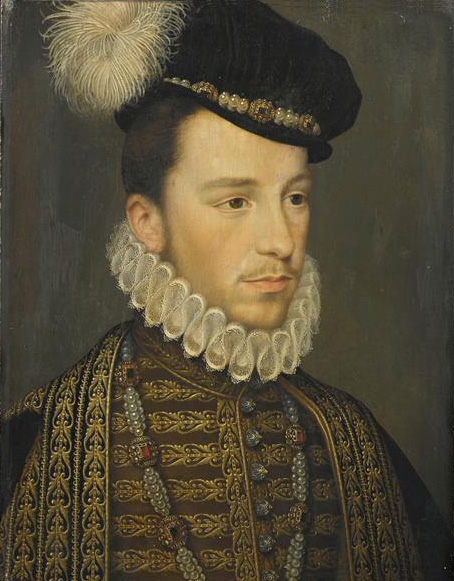
Henri III in 1570 as the duke of Anjou

Charles IX was sickly, and died in 1574 without heir, leaving his brother Anjou, now styled Henri III to succeed him as king.

In 1575 the two brothers continued their military education with their father. Both served in his company, La Valette as a man at arms, and Caumont as an archer. He would receive appointment as a gentilhomme ordinaire de la chambre du roi in 1579.

=== Saluzzo ===
Marshal Bellegarde, the disgraced former favourite of Henri, and governor of Saluzzo died on 20 December 1579. This left the governate of the important border territory vacant, though he had a son Bellegarde who wished to succeed him to the office. Henri however preferred to grant the governate to La Valette. To achieve this negotiations had to be undertaken with the young Bellegarde to consent to the loss of the governorship from his family. La Valette had been involved in the negotiations between the crown of France and the duke of Savoie over the rebellious Marshal Bellegarde in the previous year.

Bellegarde took a great deal of time to dislodge from Saluzzo, and negotiations were led by Marshal Retz and Jacques de La Fin. They eventually succeeded by deceiving Bellegarde into believing that the governorship was to be given to the king's brother Alençon who would surely devolve authority over the region to Bellegarde while he attended to other affairs. Bellegarde was also granted the office of maître de camp for the light cavalry as compensation. By this means Bellegarde was removed in February 1581.

While negotiations over Saluzzo were ongoing, La Valette was established as governor of the rest of French Piedmont in 1580, granting him authority over the few remaining possession of France in the region. As of 1574, France had ceded Pinerolo, Savigliano, La Pérouse, Labayye and Gevolle to the duke of Savoie. This left La Valette with Carmagnola, Ravel and Centallo. In his capacity as governor, La Valette selected sieur de Laffitte to represent him as his lieutenant-general in the region. Governing French Piedmont was an expensive responsibility for La Valette, as the location of the towns on France's border necessitated large garrisons. In total La Valette would devote 137,000 livres a year to the garrisoning of the territory. Regardless it would be a simpler government for La Valette than the great governates such as Dauphiné or Provence, as with the frontier nature of the towns under his authority there was no need for him to balance his authority against that of local noble interests.

=== Favour ===
By 1580, La Valette was among those close enough to Henri's intimate circle, that when the king retired from court in February to Saint-Germain, he brought with him his favourites D'O and Anne de Joyeuse, the captain of his guard Châteauvieux and La Valette. He would again be with the king in a retreat during Autumn. During these absences from the administrative responsibilities of state, Henri and the group attended various balls. When Henri visited the ill Joyeuse in May 1581, La Valette accompanied him to Montrésor.

In November 1581, La Valette's brother Caumont was created duke of Épernon by Henri. At this time he was granted the key governorship of the Three Bishoprics, which controlled much of France's border with the Empire. That same year, La Valette was established as the captain of a hundred men-at-arms. The following year Épernon and Joyeuse were made premier gentilhomme de la chambre, this freed up the offices they had held previously of Chambellan, which they resigned to their brothers. Joyeuse resigning his charge to Bouchage, while Épernon provided his to La Valette. La Valette would remain as Chambellan for a year, before letting the office lapse.

In January 1582, La Valette joined the exclusive conseil des affaires which had only eight members and set the policy agenda of the state. The other members were his brother Épernon, Joyeuse and his brother Bouchage, Villequier and Marshal Retz, alongside three administrative nobles.

=== Southern affairs ===
At this time, Henri planned to disposes the governor of the Lyonnais François de Mandelot of his charge, and provide the key post to La Valette. Épernon was keen to secure the citadel of Lyon for himself, and relations between the brothers and Mandelot began to deteriorate. In January 1585 Épernon secured it for a client of his, Aymar de Poissieu, however Mandelot turned to popular hatred of the brothers, and allowed the population to destroy the citadel in May. Rumours that Mandelot had died in June 1586 prompted Henri to grant the governorship to La Valette, however in the subsequent month the rumours were revealed to be false, and Henri oscillated to promising it to Bouchage, unsure of which recipient would best balance the two families.

A bitter rivalry developed in Languedoc between Joyeuse, and the governor the duke of Montmorency, culminating in Joyeuse's travel to Roma in June 1583 to gain Montmorency's excommunication from the Pope. By 1583 reconciliation efforts were underway, with La Valette to travel south to Dauphiné to reconcile the two men. Efforts would continue throughout the following years, culminating in several marriages between the families arranged in 1587 and 1588.

During 1583, La Valette would join the penitential order established by François de Joyeuse, the Pénitents bleus de Saint-Jérôme as one of the 72 members. In that year he would also be elevated to the most senior order of French chivalry, when he was a chevalier de l'Ordre du Saint-Esprit.

By the year 1585, La Valette enjoyed annual revenues of 23,000 livres. This would expand to 47,000 livres by the time of Henri's death 4 years later. He benefitted from his brothers authority over the army in November 1586 upon the death of the baron de Thermes which vacated the office of maréchal de camp. Épernon secured the post for La Valette.

=== War on Protestantism ===
In July 1584 Henri's brother Alençon died. As Henri had no children, this meant that his distant cousin the Protestant Navarre was to succeed him as king. This was unacceptable to a great many Catholic magnates, who used the excuse of opposition of this to reform the Catholic ligue to oppose Navarre's succession, under the leadership of the duke of Guise. In March 1585 the ligue entered war with the crown, and after a few months of conflict compelled a capitulation with the Treaty of Nemours by which Navarre was excluded from the succession, Henri committed to a war against Protestantism and the various members of the Lorraine family received surety towns.

Henri was committed, at least publicly to prosecute a war against Protestantism. As such, La Valette prepared an army in Dauphiné that he was to strike at the Protestant commander Lesdiguières with. In Dauphiné, the lieutenant-general Laurent de Maugiron, had a difficult relationship with the governor under whose authority he held office, the duke of Montpensier. As a result of this, Maugiron increased his closeness to La Valette, hoping that he could use him as a counterweight to Montpensier. Eventually he would be persuaded to resign the charge of lieutenant-general to La Valette, though with the understanding he would remain the chief representative of the king in the province. This suited Maugiron as the alternative to La Valette receiving the office would have been another local family, which could contend with him for ascendency in Dauphiné. The fighting with Lesdiguières would be fierce, and Maugiron would advise him on his lieutenants during the campaign, encouraging him to avoid the sieur de Pongibault, a recent appointment by Montpensier. The two flattered each other in correspondence back to Henri.

Despite this close relationship, neither La Valette nor Maugiron could be said to be in control of Dauphiné. Gap, Embrun, Briançon and Montélimar were held by ligueur captains, Montmorency threatened the south west and Lesdiguières could not be dislodged from the mountains south east of Grenoble while other Protestants held the Vivarais. La Valette would however preside over the Dauphinois Estates in February 1586 and impose himself on Valence in January 1587 and Vienne in March. He negotiated with the Protestants of Romans over the objections of Maugiron. As in Piedmont he was faced with large garrison costs, totalling 40,000 livres, however the Estates only granted him 10,000 livres for the cost, so he provided the rest of the money himself. Ultimately he failed to ingratiate himself with the Dauphinois nobility and build any long term networks in the province.

=== German invasion ===
By 1587, the war against Protestantism had provoked an international response. As a result of this a Protestant German mercenary army was on the precipice of invading the kingdom. After a fruitless private meeting in which he tried to persuade Guise to countenance concessions to Protestantism to avoid the invasion of the kingdom, Henri laid out the plan of campaign. Joyeuse would lead an army against the Protestant Navarre in Poitou, meanwhile the duke of Guise would lead a smaller force against the mercenary army as it crossed the border in Champagne. La Valette would be tasked with repelling Swiss mercenaries who were to descend into the kingdom in Provence. To this end he put himself at the head of an army in Dauphiné. Though in a technical sense La Valette would not become governor of Provence until his appointment by Henri IV in 1590, from 1587, his brother was governor of Normandie, leaving La Valette as the highest authority in Provence.

At court, Épernon defended his brothers interests. This culminated in a heated confrontation between the duke and Villeroy in which Épernon accused the secretary of state in front of the king of having squandered funds that were meant to be delivered to La Valette's army in Dauphiné. Épernon finished by saying he would attack Villeroy if not for the presence of the king.

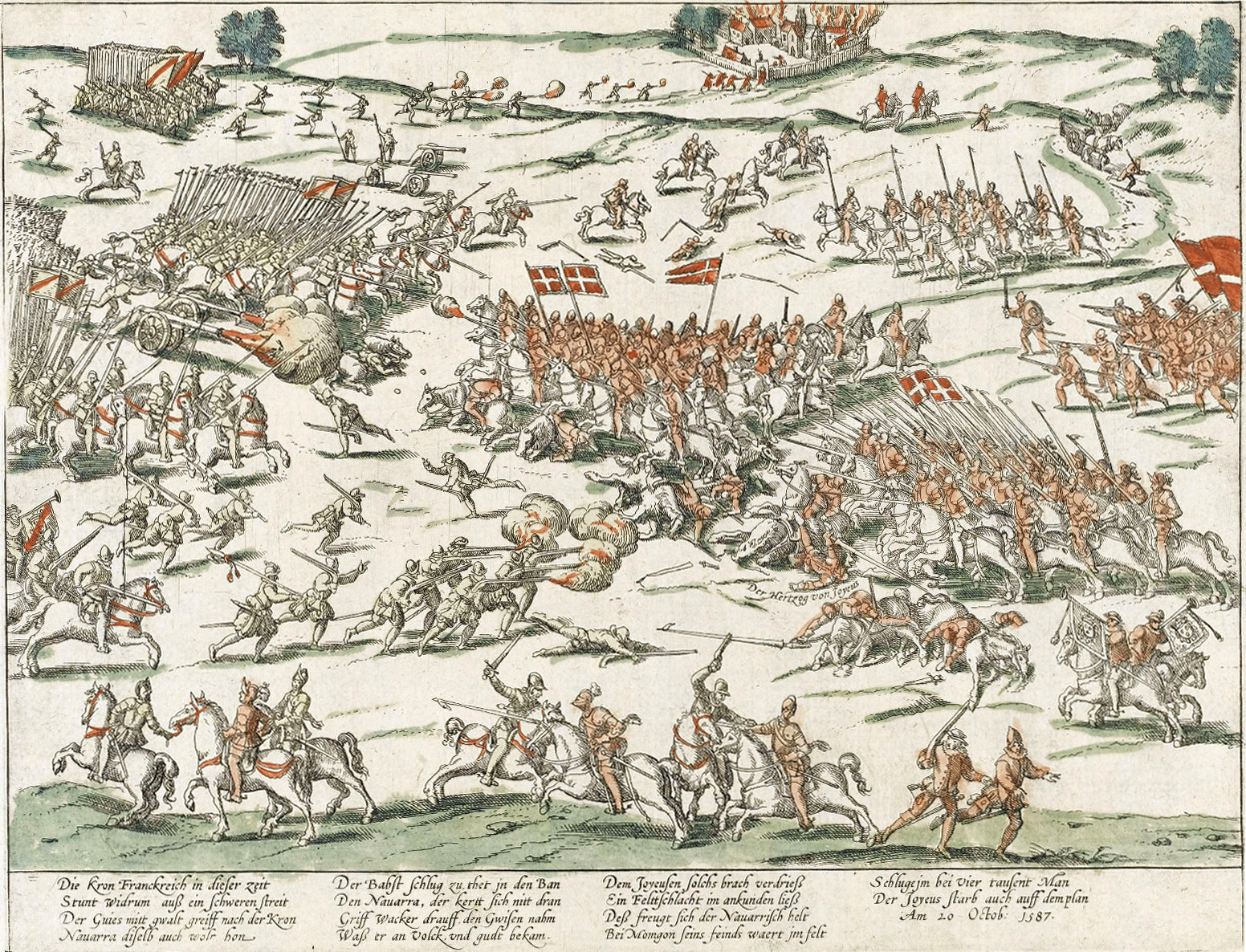
Battle of Coutras in 1587 at which Joyeuse and Bellegarde would be killed

At the Battle of Coutras, fought between Joyeuse and Navarre in late 1587, Bellegarde would be killed. This vacated the office he had received in compensation for Saluzzo, that of maître de camp for the light cavalry. Épernon demanded that La Valette receive this office, and it was promptly granted, the king recognising the strategic value in diluting the authority of the ligueur duke of Nemours who was the colonel-general of the light-cavalry.

=== Enemy of the ligue ===
From January to February 1588 the Guise held a new conference at Nancy to discuss strategy and objectives. Among the articles expounded upon were the necessity that La Valette and his younger brother Épernon be disgraced and removed from their offices.

On 13 May the king was forced to flee Paris as Guise and the Parisian ligueurs prepared to take hold of him. Left ascendant in the capital, Guise worked to draw up his demands of the king with the cardinal de Bourbon and La Chapelle-Marteau. On 23 May they presented their demands, Guise was to be established as commander in chief of the war against the Protestants, to disgrace and banish La Valette and Épernon, revoke all fiscal edicts and accept the appointment of Guisard loyalists to various key governorships.

On 27 May Henri began his capitulations to the ligue, revoking en masse forty financial edicts that created venal offices, he promised to convoke an Estates General and further brought about the disgrace of the Nogaret. With Épernon exiled to the Angoumois.

Henri's capitulation was a reluctant one however, and it would only be Épernon who was disgraced, and even he only partially. While Épernon resigned the governate of Normandie to the duke of Montpensier, he was granted permission to yield his control of the post of governor of Provence and Admiral to La Valette. He further refused to be dispossessed of his office of colonel-general of the infantry or the governates of Boulogne and Metz.

As the king's authority was destroyed in Paris, La Valette was established at Pertuis. In response to news of what was unfolding in Paris, he invited a delegation from the Parlement of Aix to meet with him. A royalist deputy was able to convince him to come to Aix. Having arrived, he was soon compelled to depart when word arrived of disorder in Marseille. Having departed Aix, the ligueur de Vins entered Aix, and after contesting for power there with the royalist Coriolis secured the city for the ligue.

=== Estates General of 1588 ===
Feeling abandoned by Henri after the disgrace of his brother, La Valette took the opportunity of the Estates General at Blois to form a cross confessional alliance in Provence, entering compact with the Protestant commander of Dauphiné, Lesdiguières. He further entered alliance with the duke of Montmorency. The duke of Savoie meanwhile decided in September as the Estates were ongoing to invade Saluzzo, and he found that with the Nogaret family cut off from royal favour, it fell to him relatively smoothly. In the formulation of the cahiers prior to the meeting of the Estates, hatred of the Nogaret family ran high. The cahiers of Paris denounced Épernon and La Valette as partisans of Navarre who had enriched themselves at the expense of the state. When the Estates themselves met, Guise proposed that La Valette and Épernon be declared rebels and Protestants. He was not able to carry the Estates along with this, but Henri was incensed at the continued attacks on his favourites. This added to a long list of grievances held by the king against Guise that drove him to have him assassinated on 23 December.

=== War with the ligue ===
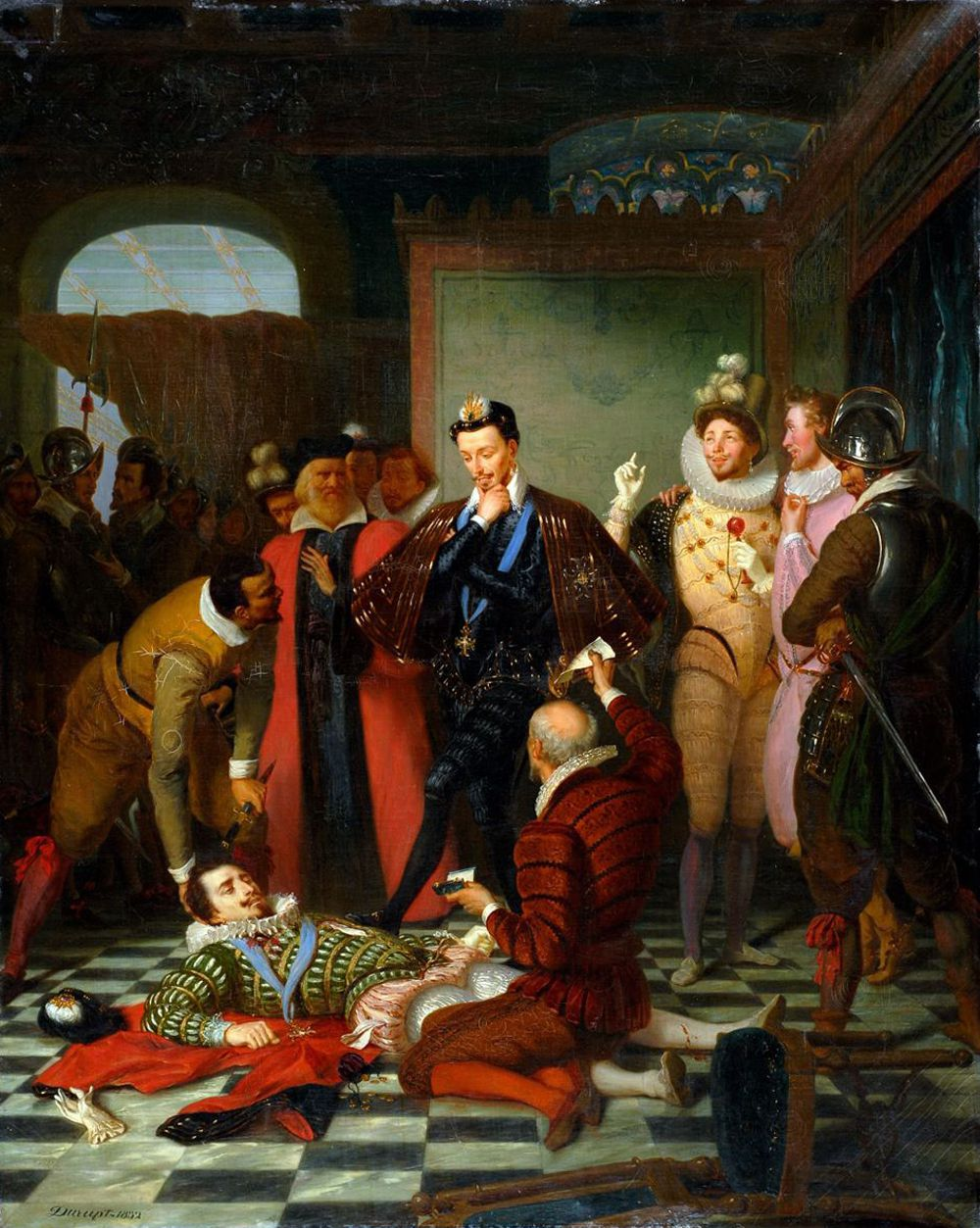
Assassination of Henri I, Duke of Guise, by Henri III, in 1588. Painting by Charles Durupt in the Château de Blois, where the attack took place.

The assassination of the duke was the breaking point for many cities across France, which defected to the ligue in the coming months. Lyon, one of the chief cities of the kingdom, did not initially defect from the crown. However the cities hatred of La Valette and his brother led to a coup in the city on 23 February of the following year. The ligueur duke of Nemours established himself in the city shortly thereafter.

In Provence, the ligueur lieutenant-general the baron de Vins travelled first to Aix and then Marseille with news of the dukes assassination. The consulate of Marseille greeted him with a great procession to mourn the death, he was cheered by the assembled crowds, while those royalists in the town, who would be loyal to La Valette were abused as heretics. By this time La Valette was the sole commander of royal forces in Provence.

Fortunately for La Valette the ligue he would be faced with in Provence would prove to be fractured between a Savoyard faction and a faction loyal to Carcès. The duke of Savoie had invaded France, seeing opportunity in the civil war to aggrandise his realm. La Valette in conjunction with Lesdiguières would successfully best him in an engagement. However, with the support of Spanish reinforcements, and allied French ligueurs, the duke was able to secure his hold of Aix, Marseille and Draguignan.

At the opening of 1589, Henri wrote to Épernon, to clarify the status of his family as regards the disgrace they had received the prior year at the behest of the ligue. He confirmed Épernon's governate of Saintonge and the Angoumois, La Valette's authority over Provence and the comte de Brienne's control of Metz. He confirmed the prior decision to grant La Valette the admiralty, and maintain Épernon in the office of colonel-general though without the ability to exercise its authority. He insisted however that Épernon hand over his governate of Boulogne. The Estates General however had other ideas, baulking at the notion of the combining of the charge of Admiral, maître de camp of the light cavalry and governor of Provence. Therefore, La Valette divested himself of the responsibilities of Admiral on 25 February to Beauvais-Nangis, who would in turn be succeeded by the son of the Marshal Biron in 1592, who La Valette had initially hoped would succeed him in the office.

== Reign of Henri IV ==
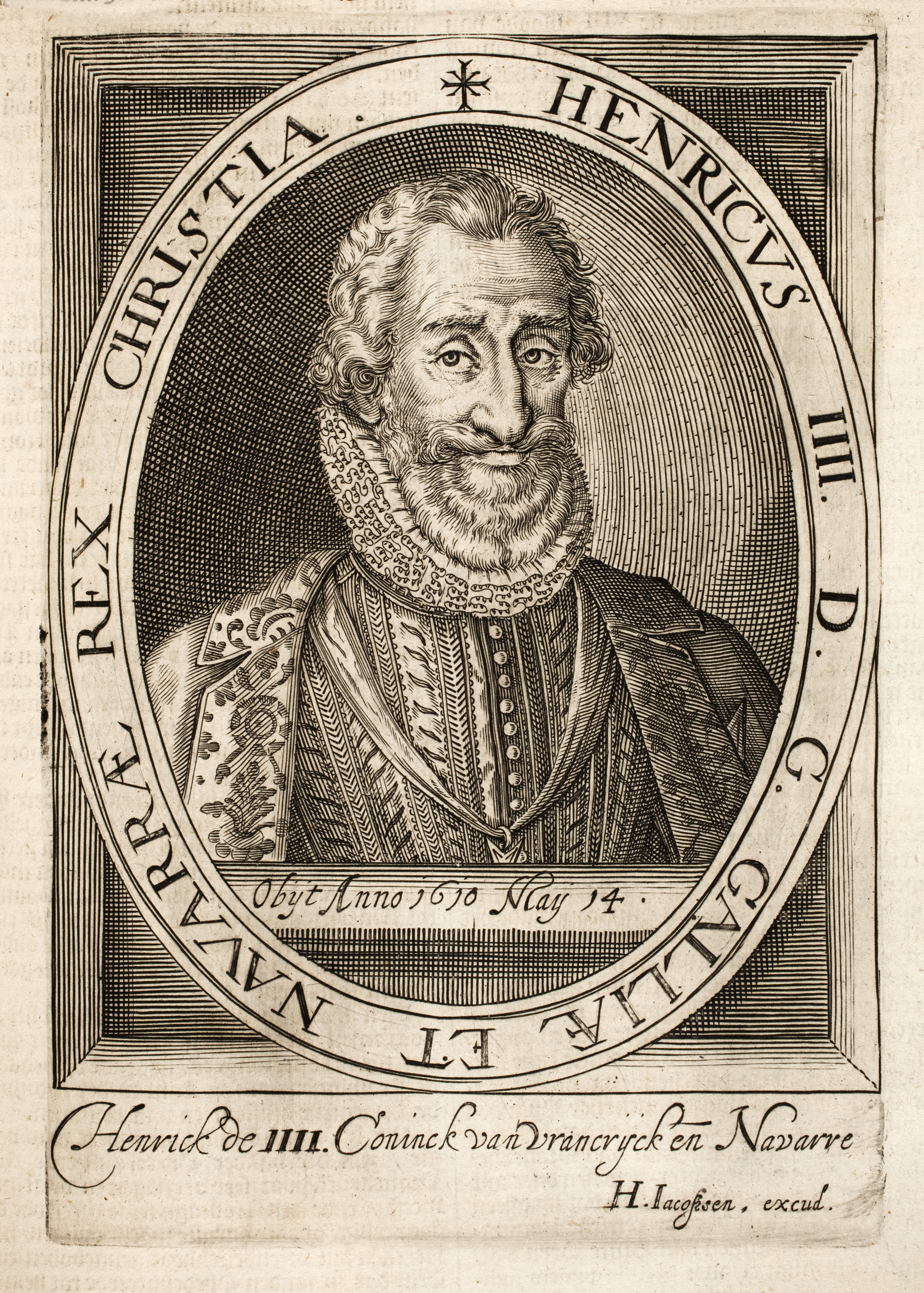
Engraving of Henri IV

In August 1589, Henri was assassinated by a radical Catholic while conducting a siege of ligueur held Paris, and was succeeded by the Protestant Navarre, who styled himself Henri IV.

=== Provence ===
On 2 January 1590, La Valette formally replaced his brother Épernon as governor of Provence. He would hold this office until his death.

La Valette died on 11 February 1592 of wounds he had received conducting the siege of Roquebrune. Épernon moved quickly to secure his brothers governate, marching through Périgord, Quercy and Languedoc with a private army. This acquisition was without the consent of Henri IV, who he nevertheless claimed to be serving.

== Sources ==
- Babelon, Jean-Pierre (2009). Henri IV. Fayard.
- Chevallier, Pierre (1985). Henri III: Roi Shakespearien. Fayard.
- Cloulas, Ivan (1979). Catherine de Médicis. Fayard.
- Constant, Jean-Marie (1984). Les Guise. Hachette.
- Harding, Robert (1978). Anatomy of a Power Elite: the Provincial Governors in Early Modern France. Yale University Press.
- Jouanna, Arlette (1998). Histoire et Dictionnaire des Guerres de Religion. Bouquins.
- Knecht, Robert (2010). The French Wars of Religion, 1559-1598. Routledge.
- Knecht, Robert (2016). Hero or Tyrant? Henry III, King of France, 1574-1589. Routledge.
- Pitts, Vincent (2012). Henri IV of France: His Reign and Age. Johns Hopkins University Press.
- Le Roux, Nicolas (2000). La Faveur du Roi: Mignons et Courtisans au Temps des Derniers Valois. Champ Vallon.
- Le Roux, Nicolas (2006). Un Régicide au nom de Dieu: L'Assassinat d'Henri III. Gallimard.
- Le Roux, Nicolas (2020). Portraits d'un Royaume: Henri III, la Noblesse et la Ligue. Passés Composés.
- Salmon, J.H.M (1979). Society in Crisis: France during the Sixteenth Century. Metheun & Co.
- Sauzet, Robert (1992). Henri III et Son Temps. Librarie Philosophique J. Vrin.
