= Philippe de Volvire =

16th-century French noble and governor

- marquis de Ruffec
- Coat of arms of Ruffec
- Died: 6 January 1585
- Noble family: House of Volvire

Philippe de Volvire, marquis de Ruffec ( –6 January 1585) was a French courtier, military commander and governor during the latter Italian Wars and French Wars of Religion. Ruffec served in the war with England known as the Rough Wooing where he saw service first in Scotland and then for an abortive attack against Boulogne. During the reign of Charles IX he developed a proximity to his brother Anjou and travelled to the Commonwealth with him when he was elected king. Having stayed with Anjou for the duration of his reign, he returned to France when Anjou became Henri III. During the fifth French War of Religion, the king's brother Alençon entered rebellion. This represented a considerable threat to the crown, and a generous truce was secured with him in November 1575. As a term of this truce, Alençon was to be given several cities, among them the city of Angoulême of which Ruffec was governor. Ruffec refused to hand over the city, arousing much fury at court. As a result of this Alençon would be granted Saint-Jean-d'Angély and Cognac. Despite receiving these he would not gain access to Bourges, whose governor Claude de La Châtre was also resistant, in January he fled court and entered rebellion again, forcing the crown into a favourable peace later that year. In 1579 Ruffec participated in Catherine de Medici's negotiations with a rebellious former favourite Marshal Bellegarde. On 6 January 1585 he died, and was succeeded as governor of Angoulême by the baron de Bellegarde.

== Reign of Henri II ==
Ruffec served under the command of D'Essé in Scotland during the Rough Wooing. After the Siege of Haddington was broken, Ruffec was among the men called back to France by Henri alongside Piero Strozzi, Guillaume de Joyeuse and future Marshal Bourdillon. Henri intended for them to serve him in a new siege of Boulogne. Boulogne would not however fall by military means, being ceded to France as a term of the Peace of Boulogne in 1550.

== Reign of Charles IX ==
Ruffec served with the brother to the king, Anjou during his reign as king of the Commonwealth. Unlike many others in Anjou's service, he remained with the king in the country until Anjou's departure to become king of France as Henri III.

== Reign of Henri III ==
=== Favourite ===
Shortly after having returned to France to assume his new throne, Henri arrived in Lyon. He took to stalking the streets with a close circle of friends who had shared in his experiences in the Commonwealth. His intimate circle was composed of D'O, Caylus, Du Guast, Entraguet and Ruffec. At this time Ruffec was a member of the king's household.

=== Alençon ===
During 1575, the king's brother Alençon had fled from court, and it was viewed as a serious risk by the crown that he would put himself at the head of the Malcontent rebels. To avoid this eventuality Catherine de' Medici conducted negotiations with him. Her discussions succeeded in securing a six months truce on 21 November of that year at Champigny. As part of the truce, Alençon was granted the towns of Angoulême, Niort, Saumur, Bourges and La Charité.

Ruffec was outraged at these concessions, as was the governor of Bourges Claude de La Châtre. Both refused to yield their cities to Alençon. Ruffec justified his disobedience to the duke of Montpensier who had come to receive Angoulême on behalf of the prince that if he opened his gates he would be cut down by his enemies as Du Guast recently had been in Paris. As the terms of the truce continued to hang in the air, a Protestant mercenary army under Casimir crossed the border in support of the rebels, catching the court off guard. Catherine was left to defend her truce at court, which it appeared had ceded much without securing anything in return. For her part she argued it was not her doing that the governors had refused to hand over their charges, and that if the king did not march on them to bring them into obedience, she would depart court for her family lands in Auvergne and do it herself.

To appease Alençon, alternate towns were proposed. Ruffec remained in Angoulême with Alençon to receive Saint-Jean-d'Angély and Cognac as compensation. Meanwhile François de Montmorency, who had been entrusted with dispossessing La Châtre proposed that Alençon receive Blois, Tours and Amboise instead. Niort was delivered to Alençon with great difficulty by the prince dauphin and Marshal Cossé provided Saumur. As such by the end of the year the prince was in possession of Saint-Jean-d'Angély, Cognac, Niort and Saumur leaving him short two of his cities.

Meanwhile, at court, Alençon accused Chancellor Birague of attempting to poison him, and used this as his excuse to back out of his commitment to the truce and join the rebels.

While the resistance of the two governors to the demands of Alençon would be a short term issue, in Picardie, Jacques d'Humières refused to yield Péronne to the prince of Condé, this resistance would spiral into the formation of the first national Catholic ligue. His major governor ally in the establishment of this ligue would not be La Châtre or Ruffec but rather the duke of Thouars. Of the three governors who had resisted the demands made of them, it would be only Humières who was suspected of having Guisard leanings. Both La Châtre and Ruffec would go on to have close relationships with the royal family.

=== Épernon ===
As Épernon travelled to court, hoping to make an impression on Henri of the value of his services, he made several stops on route to ensure that he could provide the monarch with the most complete picture of the political situation in Guyenne. In Bordeaux he met with the marquis of Villars who appraised him of affairs there, before proceeding to Angoulême where he met with Ruffec. With these interviews in hands he greatly impressed Henri and Catherine when he arrived in court with the depth of his knowledge he further satisfied Villars and Ruffec as to the missions they had entrusted him to undertake at the court.

=== Bellegarde ===
In the Autumn of 1579, Henri dispatched Catherine to the south east border of France, to deal with a situation involving one of his former favourites who had entered rebellion Marshal Bellegarde. She succeeded in securing talks at Montluel. Accompanying Catherine for the conduct of these negotiations were the duke of Mayenne, Cardinal Bourbon and Ruffec among others. The two parties successfully reached a negotiated settlement.

=== Final years ===
Ruffec involved himself in a long running dispute with the Bourbon prince Condé. Henri took the opportunity to act the peacemaker, and smooth things over between Ruffec and the powerful prince.

On 6 January 1585 Ruffec died of dysentery. He was succeeded as governor of Angoulême by the baron de Bellegarde.

== Sources ==
- Cloulas, Ivan (1985). Henri II. Fayard.
- Chevallier, Pierre (1985). Henri III: Roi Shakespearien. Fayard.
- Constant, Jean-Marie (1984). Les Guise. Hachette.
- Constant, Jean-Marie (1996). La Ligue. Fayard.
- Jouanna, Arlette (1998). Histoire et Dictionnaire des Guerres de Religion. Bouquins.
- Knecht, Robert (2014). Catherine de' Medici. Routledge.
- Knecht, Robert (2016). Hero or Tyrant? Henry III, King of France, 1574-1589. Routledge.
- Le Roux, Nicolas (2000). La Faveur du Roi: Mignons et Courtisans au Temps des Derniers Valois. Champ Vallon.
- Pitts, Vincent (2012). Henri IV of France: His Reign and Age. Johns Hopkins University Press.
- Sauzet, Robert (1992). Henri III et Son Temps. Librairie Philosophique J. Vrin.
