= César de Saint-Lary =

French noble, governor and military commander (1562–1587)

- Baron de Bellegarde
- Other titles: Governor of the Angoumois, Saintonge and Pays d'Aunis
- Born: 1562
- Died: 29 October 1587 (aged 24–25); Coutras, Kingdom of France
- Issue: Octave de Saint-Lary
- Father: Roger de Saint-Lary
- Mother: Marguerite de Saluces

César de Saint-Lary, baron de Bellegarde et Termes (1562 – 29 October 1587) was a French noble, governor, courtier and military commander. The son of the royal favourite Roger de Saint-Lary and Marguerite de Savoie, Bellegarde entered royal service as a gentilhomme de la chambre (gentleman of the chamber) at the age of 16. In 1579, his father who was rebelling against the crown died, and Bellegarde claimed his father's governate of Saluzzo, taking up his cause. The royal favourite the duke of Épernon was sent to negotiate him out of his control of Saluzzo, the two came to a compromise but this was foiled by rebellious commanders subordinate to Bellegarde who refused to yield their towns. Marshal Retz would later succeed in securing all the towns of Saluzzo, and negotiating Bellegarde out of any control over the governate. In compensation Bellegarde was made maître de camp of the light cavalry and captain in the royal ordinance company. In 1585 he became governor of the Angoumois, Saintonge and pays d'Aunis, succeeding Philippe de Volvire, in this post he sought to bring the local nobility into alignment with the crown. In 1587 he joined the royal favourite Anne de Joyeuse on his royal campaign against the king of Navarre in Poitou, and received fatal wounds at the Battle of Coutras, which he would die of on 29 October 1587.

== Early life and family ==
César de Saint-Lary was born in 1562, the son of Roger de Saint-Lary and Marguerite de Savoie.

César married Jeanne du Lion, the daughter of a Parisian parlementaire. Together they would have one child:

- Octave de Saint-Lary born posthumously and legitimised by the Parlement of Bordeaux, he would go on to have a career in the church.

== Reign of Henri III ==
=== Early favour ===
At the age of only 16, Bellegarde was already residing in the capital as a gentilhomme de la chambre (gentleman of the chamber). This royal post afforded him an income of roughly 600 livres, which he far exceeded in his yearly costs, leading him to rely on credit.

=== Saluzzo crisis ===
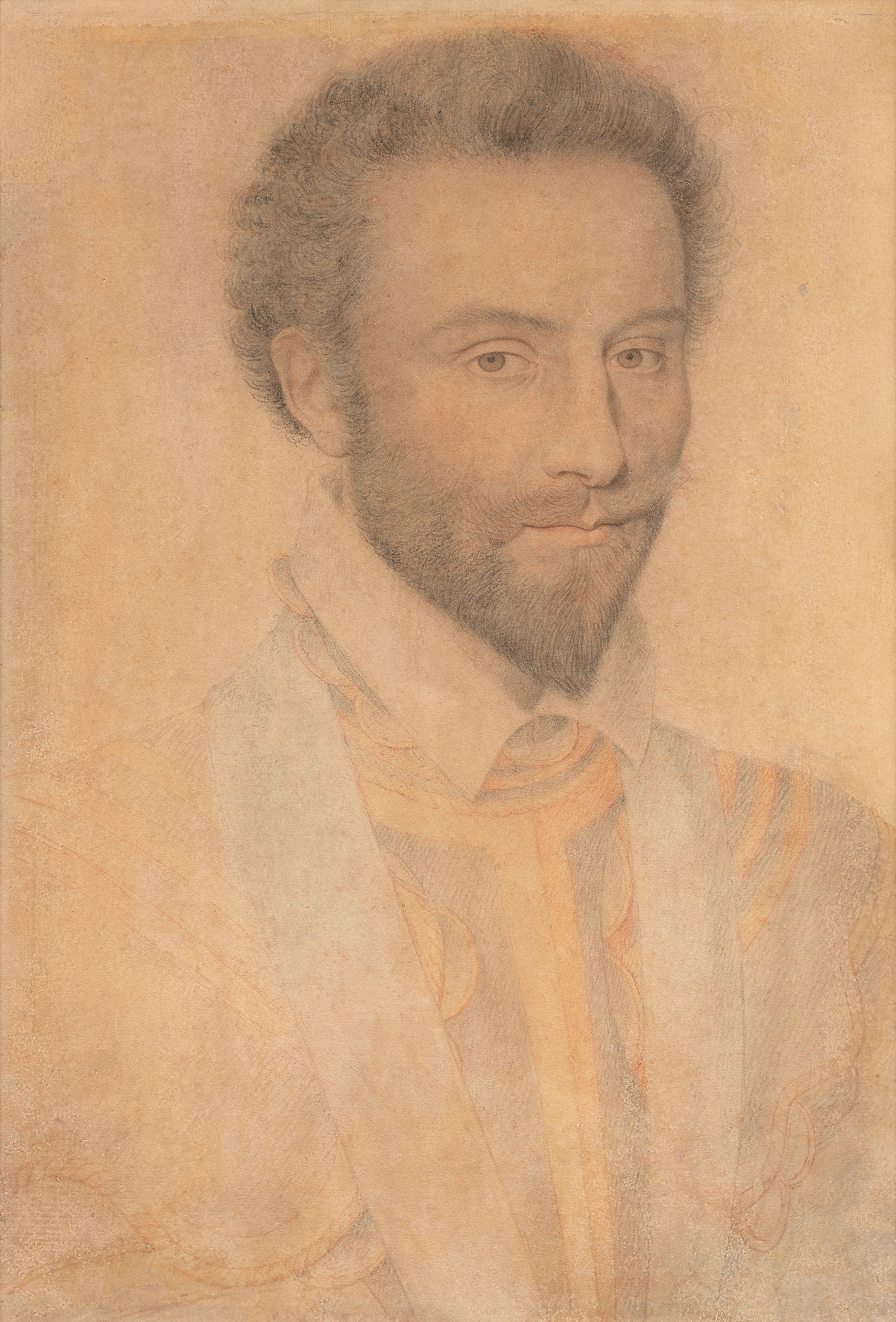
Sketch of the seigneur de La Valette who would become governor of Saluzzo

During 1579, Bellegarde's father, Marshal Bellegarde was in rebellion, operating from his governate of Saluzzo. A royal effort was established in the hopes of bringing him to terms, which finally succeeded in the latter part of the year. However shortly after peace was made between Marshal Bellegarde and the king's mother Catherine de' Medici, Marshal Bellegarde died on 20 December. Marshal Bellegarde's son quickly moved to establish himself as governor of Saluzzo and took up the banner of rebellion once more. the duke of Épernon was dispatched in January 1580 to dislodge him from his control of the region. Épernon was initially barred from entry into Saluzzo by Bellegarde, however Bellegarde relented at the end of January and afforded him entry. Bellegarde was persuaded to cede the governate, though he maintained that he would hold onto Ravel and Carmagnole. The king agreed to this compromise at the end of February. This agreement however was contrary to several of Bellegarde's captains who entered rebellion against him and held up in their towns. Épernon and Bellegarde set about besieging them. Épernon was not keen to remain away from court, and therefore departed in favour of his brother La Valette. La Valette quickly fell out with Bellegarde, and remained unable to claim Centallo and Carmagnole.

It would only be through the effort of another royal favourite, Marshal Retz and the king's brother, the duke of Alençon's Chambellan (Chamberlain) Jacques de La Fin that Bellegarde was brought back into the royal fold. Retz arrived in Autumn, and bought out the various rebellious commanders from their control of the towns of Saluzzo, he then proceeded to enter negotiations with Bellegarde. The negotiators succeeded by convincing him to resign the charge on the understanding that it would be awarded to Alençon, who would then assign Bellegarde as his lieutenant. Bellegarde was however deceived, and it was granted to the brother of the king's favourite Épernon, La Valette.

Bellegarde would not be without compensation however, and during 1581 he was established as maître de camp (camp master) for the light cavalry. This was an important post in the military. That same year he was granted the position of captain of gendarmes in an ordinance company of the king.

=== Diplomatic envoy ===
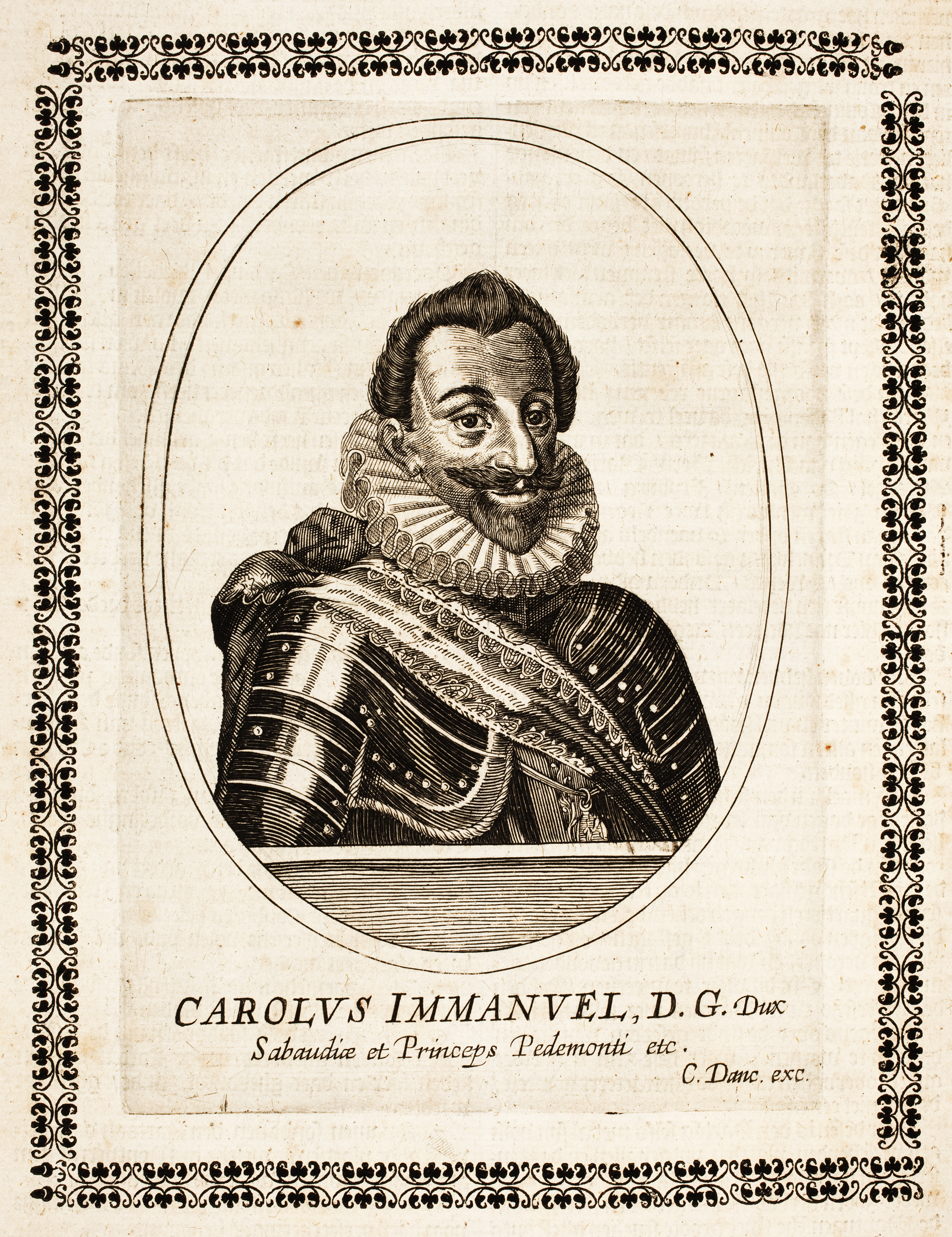
Engraving of the duke of Savoie

In August 1582, Bellegarde was dispatched by the duke of Savoie to the court of the king of Navarre at Nérac. The duke was seeking the hand of Navarre's sister, Catherine de Bourbon in marriage. Bellegarde proposed this arrangement to Navarre, but was quickly rebuffed.

=== Governor ===
Upon the death of Philippe de Volvire on 6 January 1585, Bellegarde was appointed to succeed him as governor of the Angoumois, pays d'Aunis and Saintonge.

Bellegarde arrived in the province to take up his charge in May. That same month he received the government of Angoulême. He sought to create for himself the position of intermediary between the local nobility and the royal government, and by this means reorientating the province into the royal orbit. To this end he took a line against the Catholic ligue which had been reborn in 1584 under the direction of the Lorraine family. He informed the king of the importance of working with the local Protestant grandee the comte de La Rochefoucauld, who in his assessment was the most powerful local noble. He was supported locally in this policy by Marshal Biron. During the negotiations to end the ligue crisis of 1585, Bellegarde visited the military camp of one of the movements leaders the duke of Mayenne.

=== Coutras campaign ===
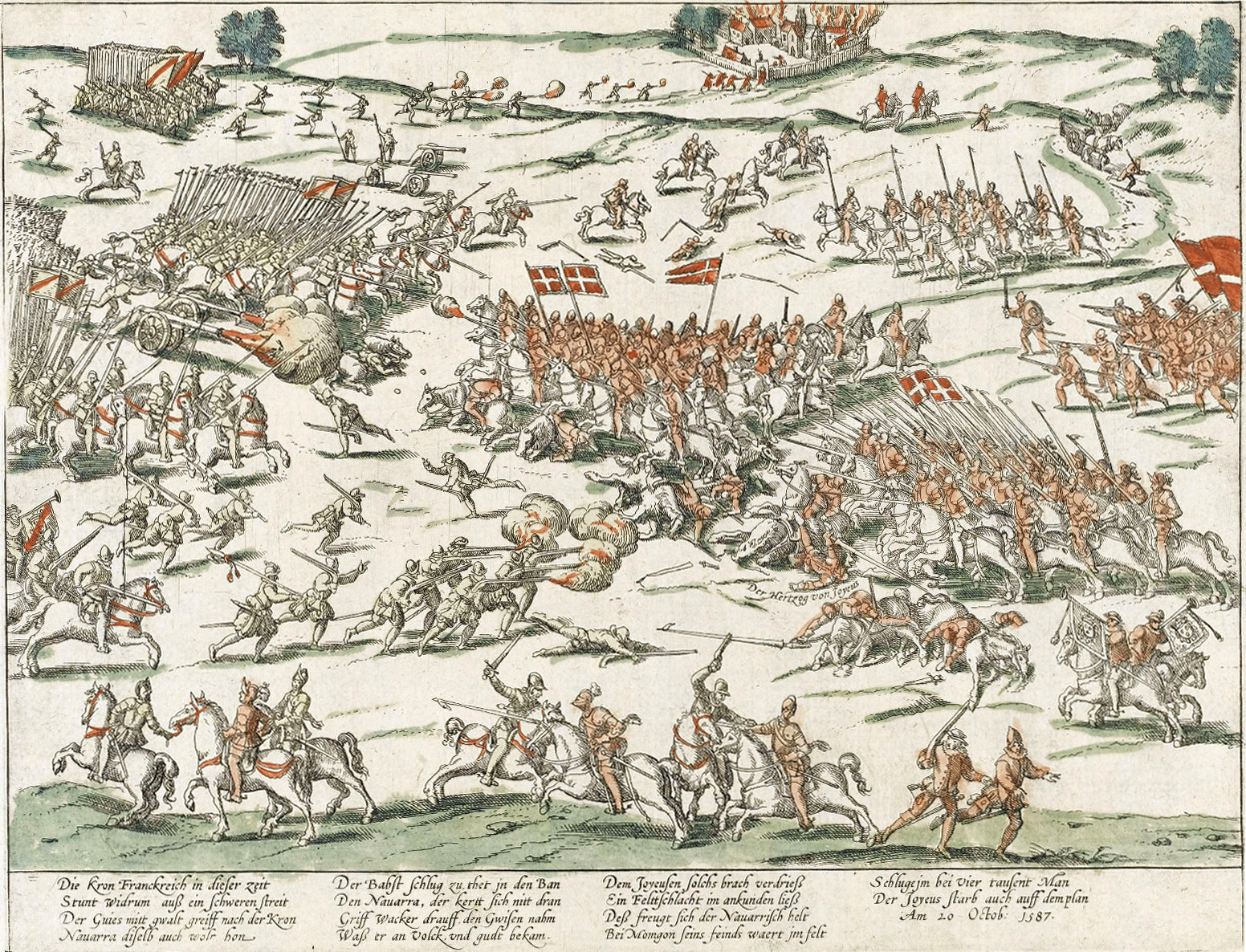
The Battle of Coutras, at which Bellegarde would sustain his fatal wounds

Bellegarde joined the arch royal favourite Joyeuse for the campaign against Navarre undertaken in 1587 alongside many other prominent royalist nobles of the south west such as the seigneur de Saint-Sulpice, the governor of Quercy and the Rouergue, and Gilles de Souvré the lieutenant-general of Touraine. Therefore, he was with Joyeuse at the Battle of Coutras on 20 October, at which the royal army was destroyed and Joyeuse killed. Bellegarde rode in the first wave of royalist cavalry that charged the Protestant forces. He received four wounds as a result, and after convalescing for 9 days he died.

With Bellegarde's death, the duke of Épernon replaced him as governor of the Angoumois, Aunis and Saintonge. His office of maître de camp meanwhile was taken by Épernon's brother La Valette. His primary title, that of baron de Bellegarde was inherited not by his son but rather his nephew Roger de Saint-Lary.

== Sources ==
- Babelon, Jean-Pierre (2009). Henri IV. Fayard.
- La Chesnaye Desbois, François Alexandre Aubert de (1778). Dictionnaire de la noblesse, contenant les généalogies, l'histoire & la chronologie des familles nobles de France. Vol. XII.
- Le Roux, Nicolas (2000). La Faveur du Roi: Mignons et Courtisans au Temps des Derniers Valois. Champ Vallon.
- Knecht, Robert (2016). Hero or Tyrant? Henry III, King of France, 1574-1589. Routledge.
