= Château du duc d'Épernon =

Château in France

- 1, rue Jehan de Brie 77610; Fontenay-Trésigny, Île-de-France, Seine-et-Marne, France
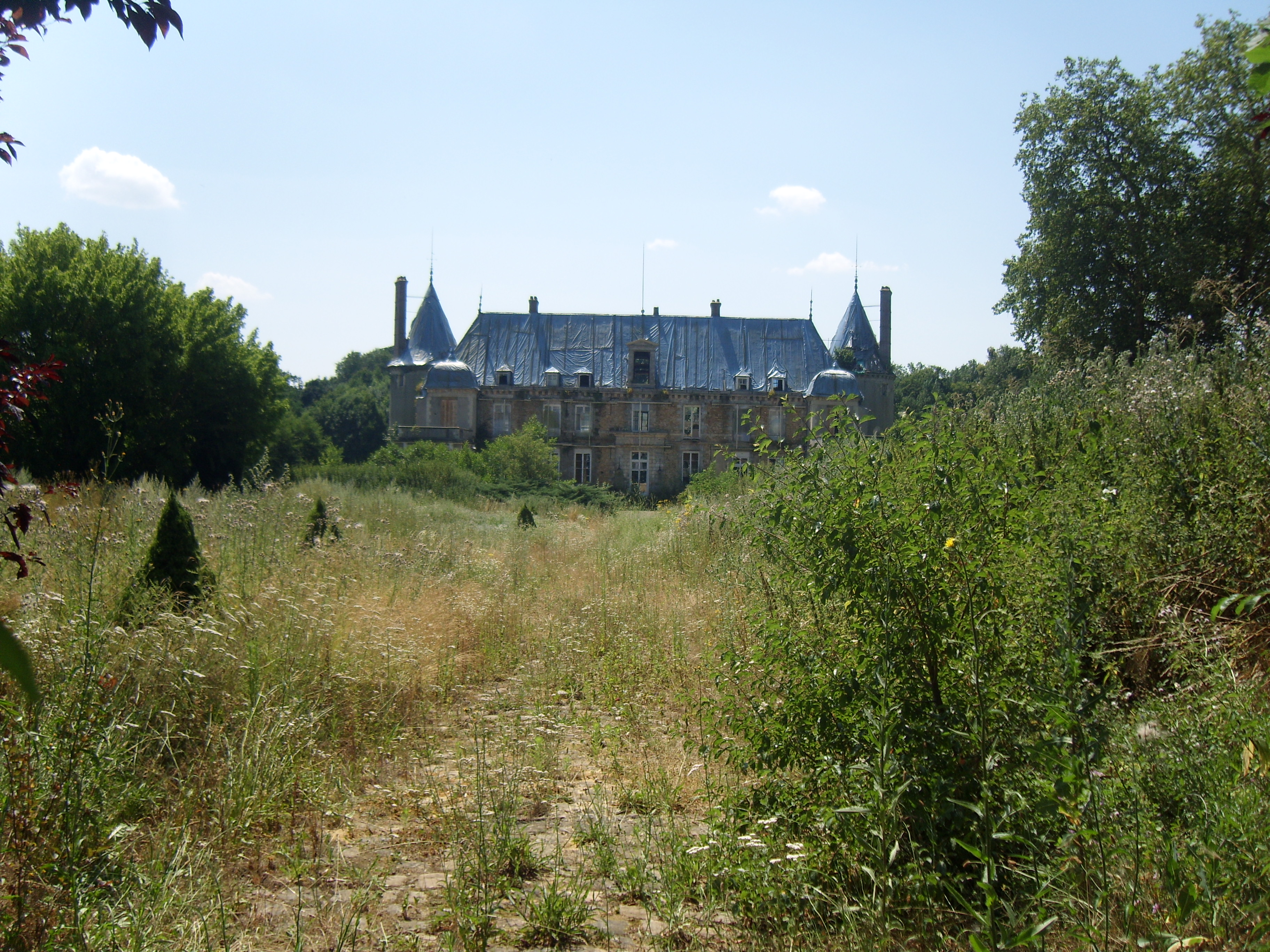
- The Château du duc d'Épernon

Site information
- Type: Quadrangular castle Renaissance architecture
- Owner: Privately owned

Location
- Location within Île-de-France
- Coordinates: 48.70611°N 2.86194°E

Site history
- Built: Beginning of the 17th century

Garrison information
- Occupants: Jean Louis de Nogaret de La Valette (1554–1642)

The Château du duc d'Épernon is a château, built on the site of a medieval castle located in Fontenay-Trésigny, in the Brie region of France, 43 km (27 mi) southeast of Paris. It stands alongside the Bréon stream and next to the Church of Saint-Martin, in the heart of a once walled old town, the history of which is closely linked to the history of the château. The castellans were lords of Fontenay-en-Brie during the Old Regime.

The château has been classified as a Monument historique since 7 October 1963, and its park land is included in the List of Remarkable Gardens of France published by the French Ministry of Culture.

== Architectural description ==
The architecture of the château is marked by the different eras when it was rebuilt after falling more or less in ruins, with different styles. The medieval castle rebuilt by Jean Le Mercier after 1389 was enclosed by walls and moat around a courtyard with two drawbridges, north facing the church and south. The current building has retained the rectangular plan flanked by round towers. Guillaume Prudhomme undertook to rebuild the castle after 1538.

The present château dates from the first half of the 17th century. The château, built by Jean de Nogaret de La Valette, was planned as a pleasure palace. The rooms were made comfortable and decorated with tapestries and paintings. The ground floor and the guard room floor were covered with large glazed tiles.

The château was then within the walled town. A French garden was on either side of the château, to the north and south. A channel was fed by the Bréon stream, with two geometrically arranged arms extending from the moat, of which the eastern branch was the longest and ran into a pool downstream from the farm of Sourdeau. A large fenced park crossed by wide avenues was located to the south. A long north-south perspective started from the walled town, passing by the château and its garden and through the park.

The château did not undergo major changes before the beginning of the 19th century. The Marquis de Gontaut-Biron, the owner in 1837, restored the main house, the side wing and the two further wings, but to open up the courtyard he pulled down the entrance wing with its turrets, the drawbridge, and two of the corner towers that housed the gothic chapel and a prison. The gardens and the old farm were landscaped into a leisure park.

The facades and roofs of the main château building, as well as one room on the ground floor which has painted paneling, were categorized as monuments historiques by a ministerial decree dated 7 October 1963. The outbuildings, including the three-storey dovecote, the surface of the courtyard, and the moat were also listed as monuments historiques by a ministerial decree of 17 October 1991.

== History ==
The castle of Fontenay is mentioned in the 12th century under the reign of Louis VI of France. It is now neglected and threatened by ruin.

The first castle here was built on a strategic site, on a pilgrimage road from Paris to Rome, continuing to Rozay-en-Brie, Provins, and Troyes, also used by traders going to the famous Champagne Fairs. The lord of the castle collected a toll from travellers passing through his domain. The Bréon creek fed the moat, upstream of the valley where the castle of Vivier and a road were on the edge of royal lands of the county of Champagne, Rozay-en-Brie and Bernay-Vilbert, separated from Fontenay by the woods of Lumigny, Bernay, and Vilbert.

The estate was in the Garlande family from the 12th century until May 1293, when Jean de Garlande sold the Tournan castellany to Pierre VI de Chambly, grand chamberlain of King Philip IV. In October of the same year, Chambly sold the Tournan castellany to Charles, Count of Valois. It was then gradually broken up and came into the ownership of several landowners.

In 1389, by letters patent, Charles VI granted the estate of Fontenay to his adviser Jean Le Mercier, knight, lord of Noviant, Neuville, and Rugles, with permission to rebuild the old castle which by then had fallen into ruin. Two years later, the new castle was standing and was the site of local courts, and also a prison. The castle, surrounded by walls and a moat, stood around a central courtyard and had two drawbridges, south and north, the second leading to the church. The present building has retained the rectangular plan, with round towers at the corners.

The castle next passed into the family of Coutes through inheritance. Around 1446, Louis de Coutes dit Minguet (the son of Jean de Coutes, sometime page of Joan of Arc), by then esquire and lord of Fontenay en Brie, Viry, Neelle la Gilleberde, and other estates, together with his siblings Jean de Coutes dit Minguet, Raoul de Coutes, Jeanne de Coutes, and Anne de Coutes, transferred the usufruct to Denis du Moulin, then bishop of Paris. On 1 October 1451, Jean du Moulin, the son of Denis de Moulin and cupbearer to the king, got permission from the king to restore the castle, land and lordship of Fontenay en Brie, and the big houses of Fleur de Lis, Sourdeau, Viry, and Escoubley, which he had newly acquired from Louis de Coutes.

In 1538, Guillaume Prudhomme began to rebuild the castle. The fortifications of Fontenay en Brie were built at the same time.

In 1570, Jean de Nogaret de La Valette became the new owner of the castle. He was visited there by King Charles IX and Catherine de' Medici.

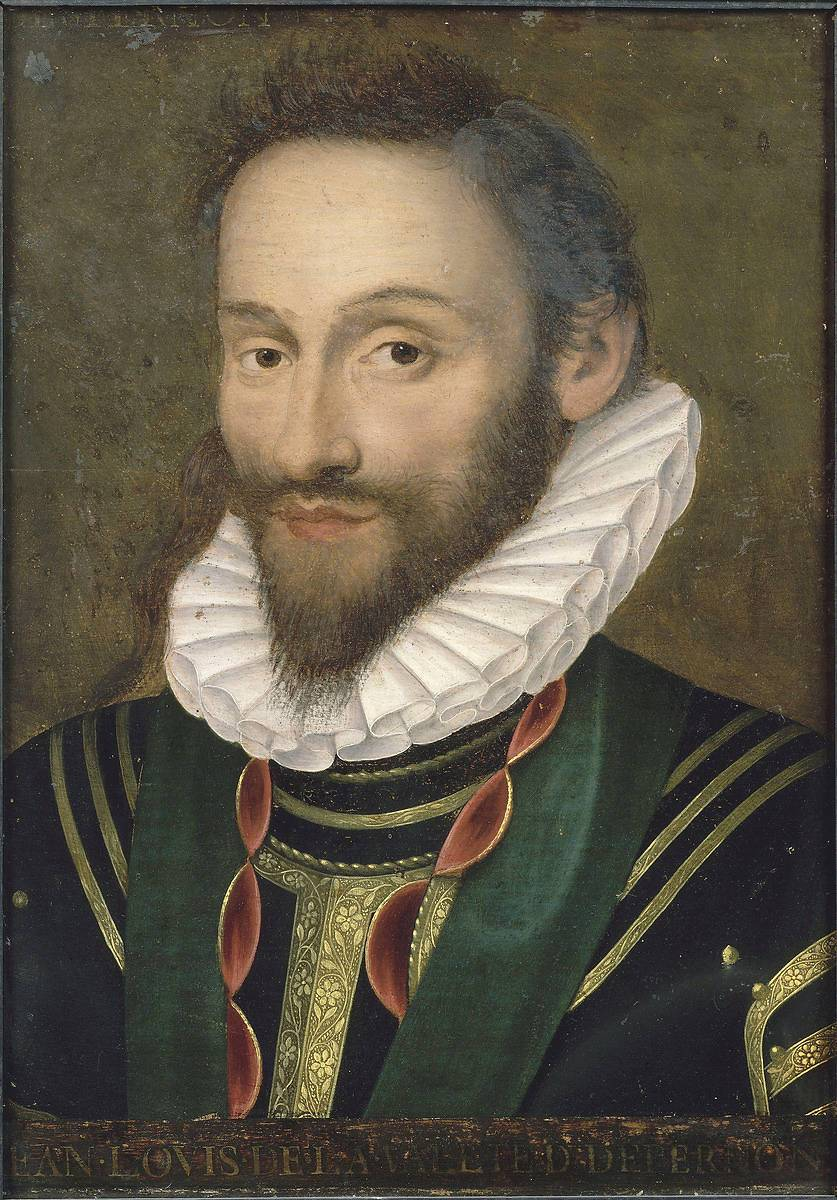
Jean Louis Nogaret de La Valette

In 1571, Charles IX invited the Protestant leaders to a meeting at Fontenay en Brie. Secret meetings were held at the castle of Lumigny between envoys of the King and Catherine de' Medici, who stayed in Fontenay en Brie, and the Protestants, including Admiral Coligny, the Prince of Condé, and Louis of Nassau. Coligny was assassinated a year later in Paris, during the St. Bartholomew's Day massacre.

In 1575, Jean Louis de Nogaret de La Valette became lord of Fontenay en Brie, and on the death of his father in November 1581 he became Duke of Épernon.

The castle of Fontenay en Brie has been the scene of many notable events and has been visited by famous figures like Henri III, when magnificent festivities took place at the castle on the occasion of his marriage, and Cardinal Richelieu, who stayed at the castle in 1633. During the first half of the 17th century, the Château du duc d'Épernon was built on the site of the old medieval castle, and the new house took on the character of a pleasure palace. The rooms were comfortable, decorated with tapestries and paintings. The ground floor and the guard room floor were covered with large glazed tiles.

In 1640, the Duke of Épernon sold the estate of Fontenay in Brie, with the château, to Pierre Aubert, secretary of the King's Chamber, General Treasurer of Artillery, head of the Ferme générale of the Gabelle of salt from 1632 to 1656. He then added the name of the estate to his own, becoming Pierre Aubert de Fontenay.

Aubert was the uncle of Marie Chastelain, the wife of Roger de Pardaillan de Gondrin, marquis of Termes, and mother of Louis Henri de Pardaillan de Gondrin, and was her benefactor.

After the arrest of Nicolas Fouquet in 1661, Aubert de Fontenay found himself in financial difficulties. In 1663, his properties in Paris and Fontenay en Brie were confiscated. At his death in 1668, his creditors and his family embarked on a lengthy procedure for the distribution of the assets of the estate. In January 1669, Marie Chastelain, Pierre Aubert's widow, gave to Roger de Pardaillan de Gondrin and his wife Marie Chastelain part of all her movable and immovable property, including the castle of Fontenay. In 1674, Roger de Pardaillan de Gondrin and his wife Marie Chastelain were formally recognized, by "arrest", as the proprietors for the time being of the lordship of Fontenay en Brie. In February 1679, Roger de Pardaillan de Gondrin, who was suspected making counterfeit money in the castle of Fontenay, was denounced in a letter to Jean-Baptiste Colbert, which claimed that he was using armed guards to transport foundries, tools, metals and chemicals, from Paris to Fontenay en Brie, for contefeiting purposes. But Roger de Pardaillan de Gondrin fled the country and went into hiding, and nothing was proved against him.

In May 1689, the estate of Fontenay en Brie was acquired by François Le Tonnelier, Count of Breteuil, with the consent of Jacques-Bénigne Bossuet, Bishop of Meaux, and Henry Beringhen, lord of Tournan. Son of a councillor of state, François Le Tonnelier was successively advisor to the parliament (1661), Master of Appeals (1671), steward in Picardy and Artois (1674) and Flanders (1683), and finally intendant of the army during the 1684 campaign, before becoming later the same year intendant des finances. He had previously been a councillor of State for a term in 1685. In February 1691, the king raised Fontenay en Brie to the Marquisate of Fontenay-Trésigny, granting the title to François Le Tonnelier, count of Breteuil. The marquisate was valued at 10,000 francs per annum, with two dependent parishes, Chapels-Breteuil and Villebert. This was a bailiwick, within the competence of the Grand Châtelet in Paris. François Victor Le Tonnelier de Breteuil was Marquis of Fontenay-Trésigny, Lord of Villebert, Baron of Boitron, Lord of Les Chapelles, etc. commander of the King's orders, Chancellor of the Queen, minister and Secretary of State for War.

The Duke of Crillon acquired the domain in 1751, but in 1772 sold it to Jean Baptiste Paulin d'Aguesseau, lord of Fresnes, Count of Compans-la-Ville, and Maligny, Marquis of Manoeuvre, an officer of the Order of the Holy Spirit, regular state councillor, son of the chancellor of France Henri François d'Aguesseau, who leased the château.

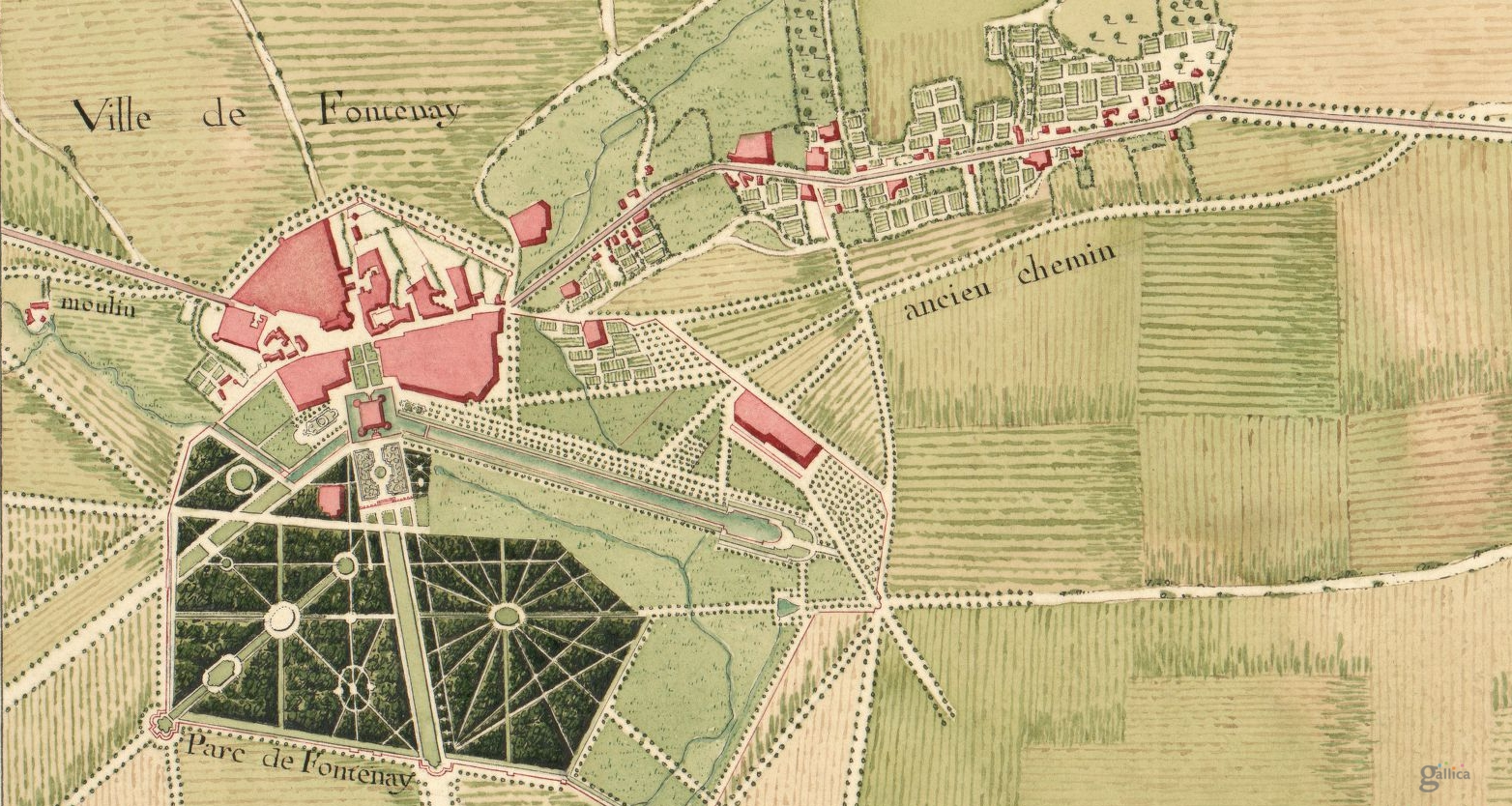
The city of Fontenay and the château du duc d'Épernon around 1750

On 25 February 1755, the Duke of Ayen, eldest son of Marshal Louis de Noailles, became the owner of the château of Fontenay and the Château de la Grange-Bléneau by his marriage to Henriette Anne Louise d'Aguesseau, daughter of Jean-Baptiste Paulin d'Aguesseau.

Succeeding occupiers of the château until the French Revolution were the Marquis Louis of Santo Domingo, who died there in 1775, the Marquis de La Chèze, who was captain-lieutenant of the first company of the Musketeers of the Guard, M. de Rostaing, and Count Claude Théophile Gilbert Jean-Baptiste de Colbert-Chabanais, who died there in September 1789.

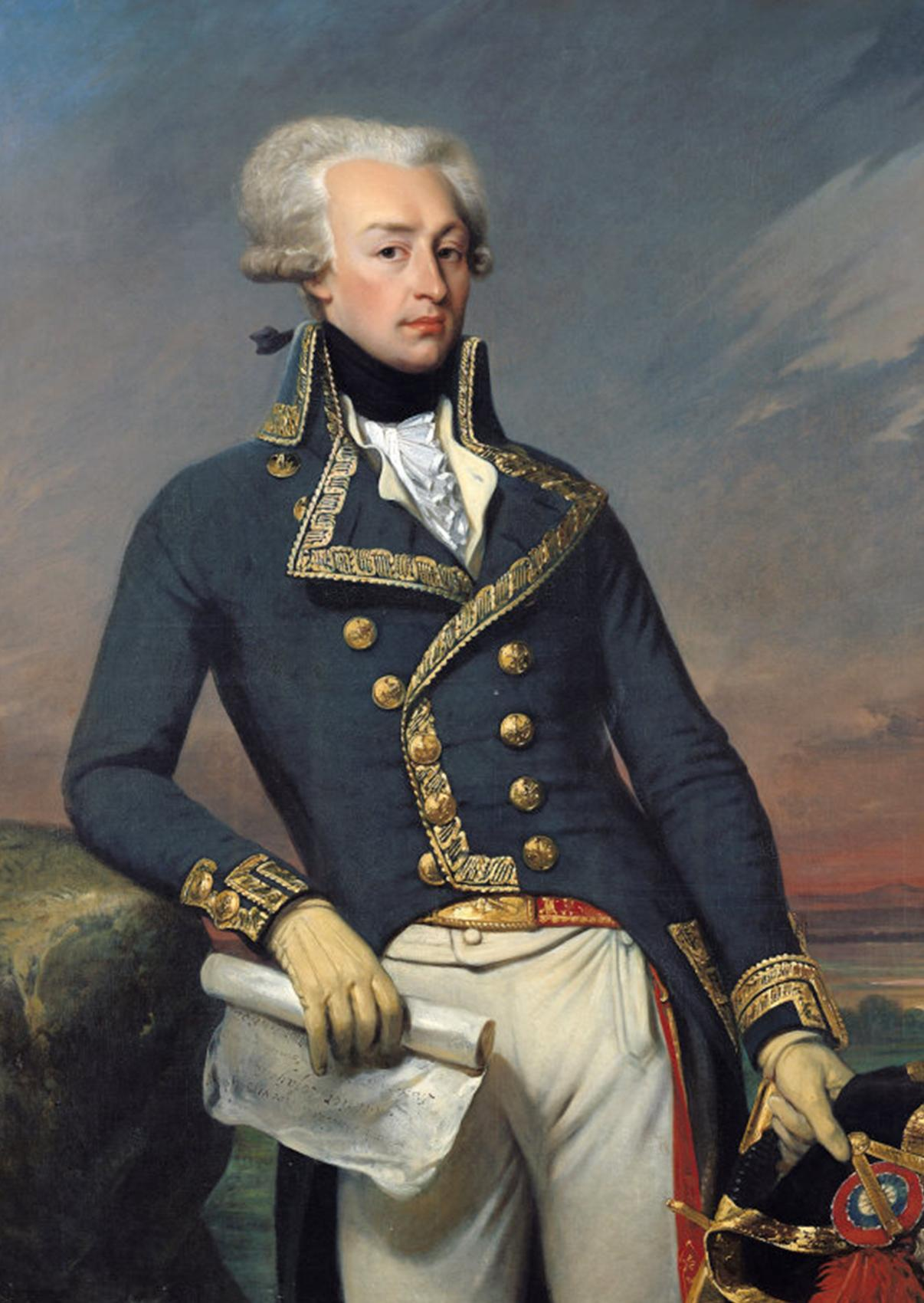
Gilbert du Motier Marquis de Lafayette.

In 1795, Marie Adrienne Francoise de Noailles, Mademoiselle of Ayen, Marquise de La Fayette, daughter of the Duke of Ayen, had authority to live for part of the time at the château of Fontenay, before leaving for Olmütz, where her husband Gilbert du Motier, Marquis de Lafayette, was imprisoned.

In 1799, the family of the Marquis de La Fayette moved to the château of Fontenay, on his return from exile, while repairs were undertaken to his Château de la Grange-Bléneau, which had been severely damaged and was uninhabitable.

In 1808, Anne Pauline Dominique de Noailles, Mademoiselle of Maintenon, Marquise of Montagu, daughter of the Duke of Ayen, inherited the château as part of an assignment of amicable shares. She repaired the house and made it her main residence. She moved her family and also opened a school for girls in the grounds of the property. She died January 29, 1839. Her daughters Stéphanie de Montagu-Beaune (1798–1874), Marie Anna de Montagu-Beaune (1801–1877) et Marie Paule Sophie de Montagu-Beaune (1805–1880) were all married at Fontenay-Trésigny and had their first children there.

In 1837, the Marquis of Gontaut-Biron bought the château of Fontenay. He restored the main building, the side wing, and two further wings, but to open up the courtyard he pulled down the entrance wing and its turrets, one drawbridge, and the corner towers that housed the gothic chapel and prison. The gardens and the old farm were landscaped into a leisure park. The château was abandoned after the death of Étienne-Charles de Gontaut-Biron in 1871, before being sold.

In August 1883, the château of Fontenay and its lands were purchased by Mr. Nicolas Menget, shoe manufacturer for the army.

In 1926, the château of Fontenay was taken over by a timber merchant, Mr. Daubek, who cut down the splendid trees of the park.

In 1936, Mr. Lucien Tasse, accountant, bought the property.

In the 1940s, the château of Fontenay was occupied by youth camps. Abandoned by their owners to benefit dependency, more convenient and less expensive apartments have long served as a warehouse.

In 2006, Mr. Samuel Tasse sold the château to a property developer specializing in historic buildings, which came forward with plans for dividing it into twelve apartments and creating another forty-eight in the various outbuildings. However, this was not brought to completion, due to the developer going into liquidation in 2014, and the château continues to decay.

In February 2022, the castle was acquired by the company Histoire et Patrimoine, a subsidiary of the Altarea Cogedim group specialising in the rehabilitation of heritage in the heart of towns, which plans a restoration. The company will carry out consolidation work to strengthen the structure during the first half of 2022. The second phase of the project will then consist in the creation of housing.

== Status of the castle ==
The Château du duc d'Épernon and its grounds are privately owned and not open to the public. The château is abandoned and the park is overgrown.

The building was already in a state of neglect in the 1950s, and works of art were transferred to the museum of the Château de Vincennes. Since then, the building has been largely stripped of artefacts.

The château was at the heart of a development programme which failed, and is slowly crumbling. The damage to the structure is now significant. However, before the developer went into receivership and work came to an end the roof of the three-storey dovecote was renovated and a start had also been made on restoring some of the outbuildings.

This classified building, which for centuries has been visited by kings and queens, and was owned by some important public servants of the Kingdom of France, is in great danger needing an urgent intervention to be saved from irreparable decay.

== See also ==
- Fontenay-Trésigny
