= Claude de La Châtre =

French aristocrat

- Baron de Maisonfort; Marshal of France
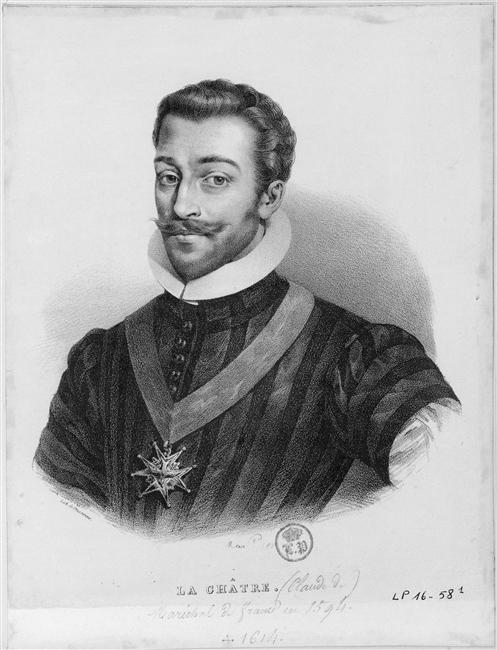
- Nineteenth century sketch of La Châtre
- Born: c. 1536; Kingdom of France
- Died: c. 1614; France
- Family: Famille de la Châtre
- Spouse: Jeanne de Chabot
- Issue: Louis de La Châtre

Claude de La Châtre, baron de Maisonfort (c. 1536–c. 1614) was a French aristocrat, governor and Marshal, who was active during the latter Italian Wars and the entirety of the French Wars of Religion. Originally a client of the Montmorency, he migrated into the service of the Guise in 1557, serving with the duke of Guise in Italy in 1557 and France in 1558. A Catholic, he remained loyal to the crown when the French Wars of Religion broke out in 1562, and was rewarded for his loyalty with elevation into the highest chivalric order and the governorship of Berry in 1568. On the death of Charles IX he avoided involvement in the Malcontent conspiracy of 1574, and strongly resisted concessions to the King's brother Alençon to restore his loyalty, which would have meant yielding his town of Bourges. Despite this hostility to Alençon, the two would gravitate towards each other with the coming of peace, and La Chârtre served under Alençon in the subsequent civil war during the brutal capture of La Charité-sur-Loire and Issoire from rebel Protestants.

Now firmly aligned with Alençon, he remained in his camp while negotiations were under way for the prince's return to the capital. After Alençon returned, La Chârtre involved himself in representing his patron's interests in the city. It became increasingly apparent that tensions between Alençon and Henri in the city were explosive, and La Châtre proposed to the prince that he flee to Angers. After a false start he escaped from Paris with Alençon and several other favourites of the prince. In 1579 he was among the negotiators who secured the terms of Alençon's ascent as king of the Netherlands. He travelled with his patron as chief of his light horse to the country in 1582 and assisted in the relief of Tournai from a Spanish siege. During the king's months in his new country, La Châtre witnessed the army dissolve from poor funds and supplies. In response to the situation Alençon attempted a coup against the city of Antwerp that failed spectacularly. La Châtre was responsible for justifying the king's behaviour to the Dutch States General.

In 1584 Alençon died, leaving the succession to fall to the king's Protestant cousin Henri III of Navarre. This was unacceptable to La Châtre, who aligned himself with the Ligue to oppose Navarre's succession. Defecting with his governorship from the crown, Henri was soon forced to capitulate to the ligue and La Châtre campaigned alongside the king's favourite Anne de Joyeuse against the Protestant Prince of Condé. As time went on however the king increasingly resented his capitulation to the ligue, culminating in his assassination of the duke of Guise in December 1588. In the wake of this declaration of war against the ligue, much of France defected from loyalty to the crown. La Châtre soon followed, bringing his governorship with him. During the next several years he campaigned against Navarre, but was increasingly concerned with infighting against the ligueur governor Boisdauphin. In 1594, La Chârtre brought over his territories to the crown upon receiving a large cash bribe of 900,000 livres as well as a promise from the now Catholic Navarre, styled as Henri IV of France, that he could maintain his ligueur granted governorships of Berry, the Orléannais and Marshal title, and pass down Berry to his son. Now a Marshal, he died in 1614, and his son sold his governorship of Berry several years later, receiving a marshal title of his own.

== Early life and family ==
Claude de La Châtre was born in 1536. He was raised in the household of Anne de Montmorency as a page.

He married Jeanne de Chabot, with whom he would have a son, Louis de La Châtre.

== Reign of Henri II ==
In 1557 he abandoned his patron Montmorency, becoming a client of the Guise family. As an illustration of his new loyalties he accompanied the duke of Guise on his campaign into Italy in 1557. With the disaster that befell Montmorency and the main French army at the battle of Saint-Quentin he returned to France with Guise the following year and continued to serve with him in his newly ascendent position at Calais and Thionville. He wrote a memoir detailing Guise's exploits in these various campaigns soon after.

== Reign of Charles IX ==
During the following decades he would balance his clientship to the Guise alongside loyalties to the Duke of Nevers and Alençon.

=== Elevation ===
La Châtre received several honours in 1568, first the governorship of Touraine in April, before being made governor of Berry in July. Around this time La Châtre was inducted as a chevalier de l'Ordre de Saint-Michel and also received a large sum of money from the crown. In September 1568 the Protestant leadership fled south from court as the crown revoked toleration. La Châtre in his capacity as governor of Berry observed that as they travelled through his governorship they added all the Protestants of his charge to their company. He wrote to the king that he suspected they were making for La Rochelle, from where they would prepare a counterattack.

After the Assassination of Admiral Coligny on 24 August 1572, the Admiral, now disgraced was deprived of much of his property. To this end the Château de Châtillon-Coligny was divided between René de Villequier, Gaspard de La Châtre and his cousin La Châtre, governor of Berry. They also benefited from the property of other murdered Protestant aristocrats.

== Reign of Henri III ==
=== Fifth war of religion ===
During 1575 La Châtre conducted a diplomatic mission to England. Having escaped from court in September 1575, Alençon, the king's brother, put himself at the head of the rebels opposing the crown. This potentially explosive situation worried Catherine and the king, who quickly sought to re-secure the prince's loyalty through the offer of several security towns, among them Bourges. La Châtre was however uninterested in supporting the crown in this bribery effort, and refused the order to hand over Bourges when Montmorency attempted to assume control of it. Ruffec meanwhile refused to hand over Angoulême, though Alençon was able to secure Saumur and Niort after some difficulty. Enraged, Catherine urged the king to punish La Châtre, but he refused. Alençon was offered Cognac and Saint-Jean-d'Angély in recompense. La Châtre, under royal pressure departed from Bourges, however he handed over the citadel of the town to members of the urban elite who he knew to be hostile to Alençon's cause before he left. Failing to receive all the towns he was promised, Alençon aligned himself more closely with the Malcontents, joining forces with their mercenaries.

=== Sixth war of religion ===
With the Peace of Monsieur having brought the fifth war of religion to a close on generous terms to Alençon, his loyalty to the crown was re-secured. When opposition mounted to the peace from radical Catholics, Alençon did not oppose it, satisfied in his gains. The radical Catholic's forced a resumption of war to revoke the peace, Alençon eager for glory decided to lead the crown's army against Protestant held cities. La Châtre fought with him at the capture of La Charité-sur-Loire and Issoire, alongside Nevers, Charles, Duke of Aumale and Guise before the crown's financial plight forced the war to be brought to a close in the more punitive Peace of Bergerac.

=== Alençon ===
Reconciled with Alençon, he was among those in his close circle as he weighed up whether he wished to return to court. In outlining his demands for a return to Paris, Alençon opined that he would need Bussy and La Châtre to receive a place on the conseil privé where they could represent his interests. He was convinced to return to court. La Châtre's proximity to the prince displeased the king. Several of the king's favourites, Maugiron and Saint-Luc used their authority to ensure La Châtre lost a trial he was engaged in, in the hopes this would persuade him to detach from the king's brothers' retinue. Meanwhile, the attorney Le Riche attempted to look for methods to compromise Alençon's position through charging his favourites Bussy, La Châtre and Simiers for the fights they engaged in with other gentleman, however this came to nothing. In February, having taken La Châtre's council Alençon decided to flee court under the pretext of going to Saint-Germain for a hunt. The preparations he undertook for the hunt were so secretive however that it aroused the attention of Henri and Catherine. On 10 February they invaded his chambers with the assistance of the captain of the Scots guard Jean de Losses. Bussy, Simiers and Rochepot were put under house arrest in the Louvre. For La Châtre who had suggested the enterprise, the Bastille was chosen to hold him. After Alençon was coaxed into apologising for his attempt to depart court by his sister, his favourites were released from their various arrests. La Châtre immediately set about planning a new escape from the court with Alençon, Bussy and Simiers, succeeding only 4 days later on 14 February. The party reached Angers by 19 February, with Catherine catching up to her son on 23 February in the hopes of negotiating his return again, he refused to see her, feigning an illness. She returned from her negotiation efforts furious at how she had been treated, both by her son and also his favourites La Châtre and Bussy, who behaved haughtily with her.

In August 1579 he was among those trusted to represent the prince in his negotiations with the Dutch States General to arrange the prince's ascent to kingship, meeting with a delegation at Tours alongside Marshal Cossé and the Marquis d'Elbeuf. After a month of tense negotiating an acceptable arrangement was hammered out in September. During 1579, La Châtre was inducted into the king's new Order, designed as a replacement for the diluted order of Saint-Michel that of the Saint-Esprit.

=== King of the Netherlands ===
As Alençon was preparing to travel to his new kingdom in 1581, he faced significant military opposition in the Spanish forces that were currently besieging Cambrai. Cossé and La Châtre represented the only members of his retinue that had significant military experience. La Châtre would serve as the leader of Alençon's light cavalry during his time in the Netherlands. Upon entering the country, the duke of Parma's army, ravaged by attrition, scattered from in front of Cambrai allowing Alençon to claim the city. He was received rapturously. While Alençon was enjoying the adoration of the cities inhabitants, La Châtre was struggling to maintain his forces in villages nearby, many of whom were becoming mutinous due to the lack of water. La Châtre travelled into the city, to instil a sense of urgency in Alençon to satisfy his men or La Châtre would be powerless to stop their retreat back to France.

Pay for his troops also proved a serious problem, especially after the States General made it clear that they could not meet the financial promises they had made to the prince at Tours. La Châtre, darkly mused that all their promises had served only as bait to draw his soldiers and prince into a cage. As a result of these privations La Châtre reported that the army had dissolved away until by Autumn 1582 he only had 3000 men. In November the States were persuaded to renegotiate their financial commitment to their king, expanding the revenues available to him to 4,000,000 livres a year for the prosecution of the war against Spain.

In January 1583 Alençon decided that he was not satisfied with the cities currently under his authority, and to this end decided to surprise the city of Antwerp, entering under false pretences before seizing the city. The plan however failed spectacularly and the French forces were massacred by the prepared citizenry and Alençon was forced to flee the city. La Châtre was charged with explaining Alençon's behaviour and coup attempt to the Dutch States General. He weaved an entirely different story, in which Alençon had simply been trapped in the city by the Dutch guards, separated from his army, and that violence had only started after his restless troops were reunited with him, despite his desperate urgings that any man who attacked a citizen of the city would be hanged. La Châtre's exculpatory version of the events is however not taken seriously by historians, or be contemporaries, diverging as it does with every other account of the attempted coup. Alençon is generally seen as orchestrating the violence, with his young officers. In the wake of this debacle, Alençon's influence further waned in his kingdom.

=== Fight for loyalty ===
In 1584, the king's brother Alençon died, meaning that the Protestant Navarre was next in line of succession. The prospect of a Protestant king was unacceptable to many Catholics, and a ligue was formed by the Duke of Guise in September 1584 to exclude Navarre from the succession in favour of Cardinal Bourbon. Soon after Alençon's death, Épernon succeeded in usurping La Châtre's position as governor of the ancient Château de Loches, which he had held for the prince. La Châtre was initially courted by the king's favourite Joyeuse, who offered him patronage in lieu of Alençon, a need that had been made apparent by his loss of Loches. To buy his loyalty the king promised La Châtre that the next time there was a vacancy in the Marshalate he would be the first candidate the king would consider. This courting ultimately failed, and La Châtre rallied to Guise in their effort, bringing over the towns of his governorship, primarily Bourges in April 1585. After the quick capitulation of the crown to the ligue demands, he was tasked with campaigning in Poitou against the Protestant Prince of Condé, working alongside the governor of Anjou Bouchage and his brother Joyeuse. Together they drove Condé off after his capture of the 'château d'Angers' reconquering it for the crown. At the end of 1585, Entragues indicated that he was willing to give up his position in Orléans to a man of the king's choosing. This caused frantic efforts by Guise and La Châtre to avoid losing a strategic city to a royal loyalist. Entraguet was sent to Orléans to entreat with Entragues and by May 1586 his loyalty was secured for the king.

=== War of the ligue ===
Though the ligue and crown were now nominally allied against the Protestants, the king was unable to tolerate the hold the Guise had over him and the kingdom. The final break came after the Day of the Barricades in which the king was forced to flee Paris. Taking charge in the capital, Guise instructed La Châtre to reach out to the great noble Nevers promising him a prominent place in a new government. La Châtre highlighted the power that Ėpernon had over the king, and implied a solution to this. He continued to play on this theme in letters to Nevers, writing in June that rumours the king had dismissed Épernon were false, and that only the ligue could solve the government.

Henri meanwhile set about arranging for the duke of Guise's assassination, which was executed in December 1588. In response to the murder of the Catholic 'hero', many French cities defected from the crown once more, La Châtre initially wrote to the king assuring him of his continued loyalty, before in April of the next year, declaring himself in rebellion against a king who had 'allied himself with Protestantism'. Raising troops in his governate, he attempted first to surprise the city of Tours through a coup, with leading figures in the city to betray it to his forces, however the plot was betrayed, and Navarre suppressed the attempt on his city of residence. As such La Châtre brought his forces to Paris to aid in the defence of the city against attempts by Henri to reclaim the capital. Having arrived he took command of landsknechts defending the right bank of the Seine. In July while in the process of putting the city to siege, Henri was assassinated.

== Reign of Henri IV ==
=== Montigny ===
The attention of the ligue now shifted to face Navarre. La Chàtre meanwhile attempted to seize the town of Aubigny but was bested by a representative of the late king, Montigny, who forced him to lift the siege. La Châtre's loyalty to the ligueur cause was even at this point, largely motivated by self interest, and he conspired against his fellow ligueur governor Boisdauphin for authority.

=== Loyalist ===
In February 1594 he abandoned his allegiance to the ligue, bringing over the cities of Orléans and Bourges to the royal camp in his liguer capacity as governor of Berry and the Orléannais. In return for bringing the towns over to the crown, he received 898,000 livres and a promise that his son would succeed him as the lieutenant-general of Berry, while he would maintain the Orléannais and Berry governorships during his lifetime. He was also assured that the office of Marshal, bestowed upon him by the ligueur Mayenne, would become an official Marshalate under Henri IV.

=== Succession ===
In 1616, two years after his death his son sold the governate of Berry for 180,000 livres and a Marshal baton.

== Sources ==
- Babelon, Jean-Pierre (2009). Henri IV. Fayard.
- Chevallier, Pierre (1985). Henri III: Roi Shakespearien. Fayard.
- Durot, Éric (2012). François de Lorraine, duc de Guise entre Dieu et le Roi. Classiques Garnier.
- Harding, Robert (1978). Anatomy of a Power Elite: the Provincial Governors in Early Modern France. Yale University Press.
- Holt, Mack (2002). The Duke of Anjou and the Politique Struggle During the Wars of Religion. Cambridge University Press.
- Jouanna, Arlette (1998). Histoire et Dictionnaire des Guerres de Religion. Bouquins.
- Knecht, Robert (2014). Catherine de' Medici. Routledge.
- Knecht, Robert (2016). Hero or Tyrant? Henry III, King of France, 1574-1589. Routledge.
- Pitts, Vincent (2012). Henri IV of France: His Reign and Age. Johns Hopkins University Press.
- Le Roux, Nicolas (2000). La Faveur du Roi: Mignons et Courtisans au Temps des Derniers Valois. Champ Vallon.
- Salmon, J.H.M (1975). Society in Crisis: France during the Sixteenth Century. Metheun & Co.
- Sutherland, Nicola (1980). The Huguenot Struggle for Recognition. Yale University Press.
