= Roger II de Saint-Lary =

French duke

- Duc de Bellegarde, seigneur de Termes
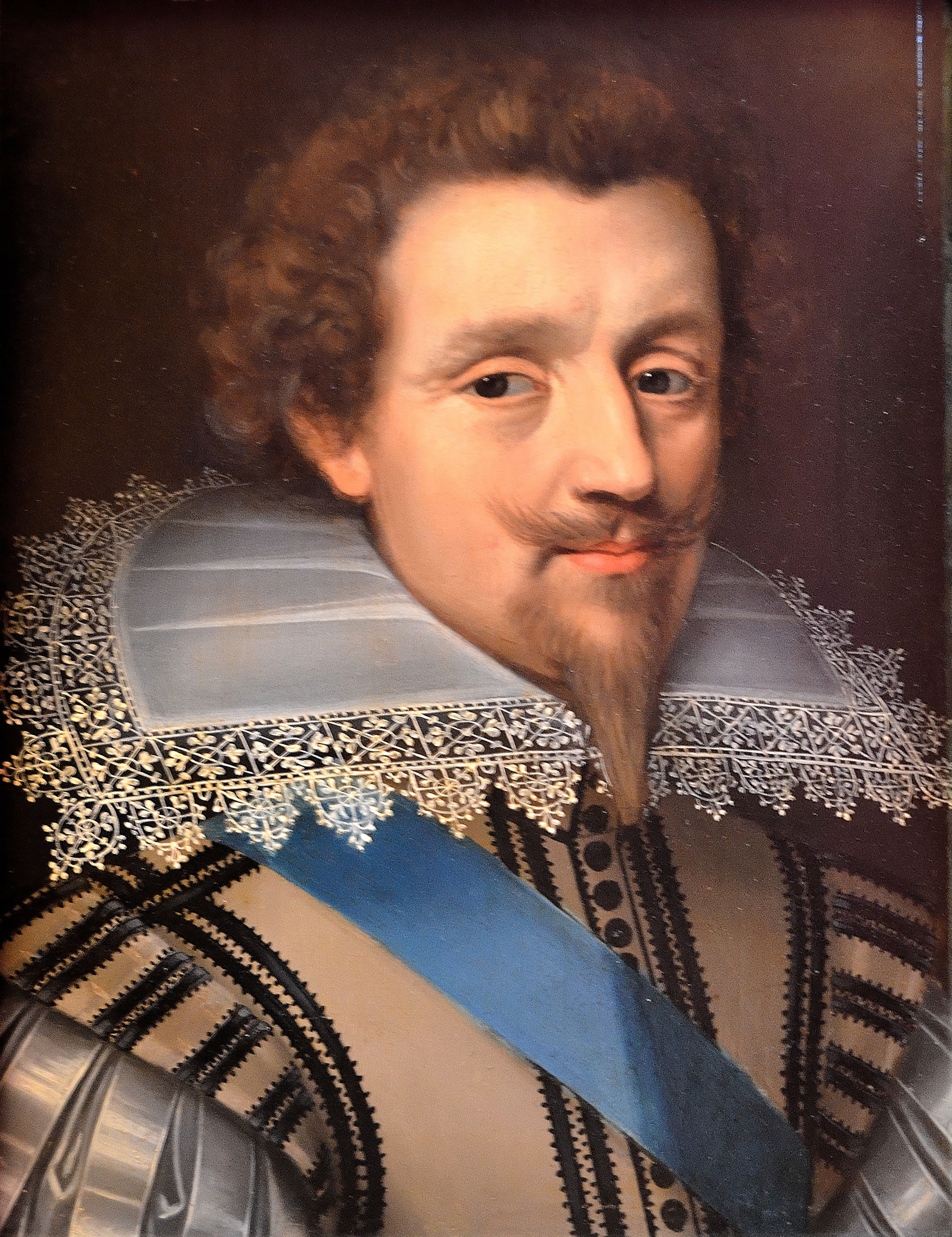
- Portrait of the duke by Dumonstier
- Other titles: Grand Écuyer
- Born: 10 December 1562
- Died: 13 July 1646 (aged 83); Paris, Kingdom of France
- Father: Jean de Saint-Lary

Roger II de Saint-Lary, seigneur de Termes, duc de Bellegarde (10 December 1562 – 13 July 1646 in Paris), nephew of Roger de Saint-Lary de Bellegarde, was a French duke.

== Life ==
Armoiries de Roger de Bellegarde, duke de Bellegarde.

A son of Jean de Saint-Lary, who was a military governor of Metz, he was brought to court by the duke of Épernon. He quickly became a favourite of Henry III, and maintained this position during the reigns of Henry IV and Louis XIII. It was also during the reign of Henry III that he became royal master of the horse. In 1602 he received the title of governor of Burgundy after his involvement against the Biron conspiracy.

His estate of Seurre in Burgundy was created a duchy in the peerage of France (duché-pairie) in his favour under the name of Bellegarde, in 1619. In 1645 the title of this duchy was transferred to the estate of Choisy-aux-Loges in Gâtinais.

Bellegarde was an illustrious noble at the French court who sided with Gaston, Duke of Orléans. During the turbulent years of 1629 and 1630, in which Marie de Medici and Gaston had reputedly allied against Cardinal Richelieu, there were rumours that Bellegarde kept their agreement in a precious necklace he wore at court. After the Day of Dupes, in 1631, when Gaston tried to rally an army against the king but failed, Bellegarde let him pass through his estates to Lorraine and yet tried afterwards to rally people in his own district against the king. Upon hearing of this, the king started moving towards Burgundy with an army and took Dijon, after which Bellegarde fled Now in possession of Dijon, the king ordered the Parlement to issue an edict against Gaston's followers. Bellegarde's governorship was therefore taken from him and given to Henri II, Prince of Condé. By 1632 however, he had received royal forgiveness from Richelieu, so that he could return to France. This was due to his importance.
