= René de Villequier =

French governor

- baron de Clervaux d'Aubigny et d'Ivry-le-Château
- Villequier family coat of arms
- Born: c. 1530
- Died: 1586
- Spouse: Françoise de la Marck (–1578) Louise de Savonneires (1586)
- Issue: Charlotte-Catherine de Villequier; Claude de Villequier
- Father: Baptise de Villequier
- Mother: Anne de Rochechouart

René de Villequier, baron de Clervaux, d'Aubigny et d'Ivry-le-Château (c. 1530 –1586) was a French governor and favourite of king Henri III during the French Wars of Religion. Rising to prominence early in the reign of Charles IX, he gravitated towards the king's brother Anjou, the future Henri III, serving with him on his council after the duke's appointment as lieutenant-general of the kingdom in 1567. He and his wife Françoise de la Marck acted as power brokers in the replacement of the bishop of Paris the following year. In 1572 he was elevated to the position of gentleman of the king's chamber and then to Chamberlain of the duke's wardrobe. From this position he received information of the duke's election as king of the Commonwealth, and worked to persuade Anjou to seize the role.

Accompanying his benefactor to his new kingdom, Villequier found himself sidelined for the king's affections by Bellegarde with whom he argued bitterly. Upon receipt of news that Anjou's brother had died, Villequier was among those urging the king to return to claim the French throne as quickly as possible, and played a key role in Henri's flight back to France. As reward for his service, he was made 'first gentleman of the chamber' a position he would share with the incumbent Retz favourite of the king's mother Catherine de Medici. In 1577 Villequier, furious at his wife's alleged affair and plan to poison him, would murder her in their chambers at Poitiers, being pardoned by the king for his crime. Villequier was among the first intake for the new Ordre du Saint-Esprit in 1578. In 1590, after the vacancy of the position of governor of the Île de France the previous year, Villequier would be appointed governor of the region and the city of Paris. He would hold this office until he was forced to yield it to François d'O in 1586. By the 1580s the king's favour had migrated to new men, Joyeuse and Épernon, who were both granted the role of first gentleman of the chamber with more access to the king than Villequier. Having remarried in 1586, he died shortly thereafter.

== Early life and family ==
=== Family ===
René de Villequier, born some time around 1530 was the second son of Baptiste de Villequier, baron de Villequier and Anne de Rochechouart. He married Françoise de la Marck with whom he had one daughter, Charlotte Catherine de Villequier. In 1581 a marriage was secured between his daughter and François d'O, another of Henri's favourites. Increasingly uneasy about the prospect of d'O inheriting his wealth, he remarried in 1586 to Louise de Savonneires one of Catherine de Medici's maids of honour. They had a son Claude de Villequier, who died aged nineteen.

=== Murder ===
The most infamous incident of Villequier's life occurred while staying in Poitiers in September. Villequier, learning of his pregnant wife's alleged infidelity with a man named Barbizi, and the presence in her safe of vials of poison supplied by a Florentine doctor, stabbed her to death in their bed and then pursued a servant who jumped out the window to escape his wrath. The king, in whose apartments he was staying did not look unfavourably on the act and would pardon him from being subject to any justice for his crime. Writing in a letter to a friend the king described Françoise as a 'putain de fame' and praised Villequier for his crime. The rumours which swirled about his wife's infidelity also dampened outrage directed at him from the upper nobility.

After O's death, Charlotte-Catherine remarried to Jacques d'Aumont in 1599, the prévôt de Paris. Villeqier's second wife would remarry to Martin du Bellay prince de Yvetot.

=== Contemporary reputation ===
Villequier was described in a 1586 'mirror for princes' intended for the duke of Savoy as an unscrupulous joker whose religious opinions bordered on the atheistic. The same year the Spanish ambassador wrote disparagingly back to his court that the 'godless Mignon' Villequier had taught Henri the 'vice that nature detests', i.e. homosexuality.

== Reign of Charles IX ==
=== Anjou ===
Villequier and his brother Claude de Villequier enjoyed favour at court during the reign of Charles IX. A great enthusiast for gambling, Villequier won a gold chain worth 2000 écus, gifted to the ambassador Alluye by the duke of Savoy during a game of cards in 1562. That same year he was among the gentleman who interviewed Anjou the king's brother about the attempt by Jacques, Duke of Nemours to kidnap him and spirit the prince to the more reliably Catholic surrounds of Lorraine. This was the beginning of his lifetime association with the man who would become Henri III. In 1563 he received seigneurial rights over the village of Faverolles, a possession of the prince.

=== Ascent ===
During the second civil war, the Constable Anne de Montmorency was killed on the field at the battle of Saint-Denis. This severed the head of the royal armies leadership. Catherine de Medici in considering who to replace the duke with was keen to avoid an independent magnate holding such a sway over the royal military. As such she selected Anjou for the important role of lieutenant-general of France, while the office of Constable would be left vacant. He remained too young and inexperienced to hold more than nominal command of the royal army. As such a council of advisers was created to support him in military decision making. Villequier would be among the nobles guiding the young prince, alongside the duke of Montpensier and Marshal Cossé.

Together with his wife he was involved in the decision to select a new Bishop of Paris after the death of the occupant in 1568. They also received payments from the canon in charge of overseeing the see while it was vacant. Villequier was among the nobles on the council that negotiated the Peace of Saint-Germain-en-Laye which brought to a close the third civil war, which had raged from 1568 to 1570. In 1572, Villequier and his brother were appointed as gentleman of the kings chamber. Maintaining his proximity to Anjou, in 1573 he was granted further revenue collection rights, in the absence of the duke he was to have authority over the abbey of Pontlevoy, he was also Chamberlain of the dukes wardrobe.

=== Henryk Walezy ===
Both Villequier brothers would be in Anjou's inner circle upon his election as king of the Commonwealth. In his capacity as first Chamberlain for the would be king, it was Villequier who received the news from the Commonwealth's ambassador of his election as king. He desperately tried to persuade Anjou against accepting the appointment, causing much fury to be directed at him by Charles and Catherine who saw the appointment as advantageous. The Venetian ambassador reported that Charles attempted to kill Villequier with his bare hands. While he had started the expedition to Poland ascendent in Anjou's favour he began to find himself supplanted by the rise of Bellegarde who dominated the king's attentions in the country. Villequier quarreled with Bellegarde during their stay in the country.

== Reign of Henri III ==
=== First gentleman ===
The factional strife between the king's favourites would be put on hold by the news of Charles' death back in France. After a debate, in which Villequier and Pibrac championed flight while Belliėvre warned that it would jeopardise his reputation. Henri decided in favour of Villequier's position, that an immediate departure to claim the French throne was necessary. Villequier commanded the horse during the king's flight from the Commonwealth, and found himself restored to the king's affections for his key role in the monarch's escape. While still travelling across Germany to their end point of Lyon, Henri rewarded Villequier with the position of first gentleman of the chamber. This role carried the privilege of sleeping in the king's chamber while he slept, granting extraordinary access to the king. Villequier had apartments in the Louvre consisting of several rooms and a wardrobe. Catherine for her part was not keen to see her favourite Retz pushed out of this position. As such she agreed a compromise with her son over the position with the two notables sharing the position across the year. In his capacity as first gentleman of the chamber, Henri would gift Villequier the furniture that had once belonged to Louise de Savoie the king's great-grandmother.

=== Poitiers ===
After the death of several of Henri's earliest favourites, Du Guast and Saint-Sulpice, Villequier assumed a central position in the king's attentions. While staying in Poitiers in 1577, the king became fearful that the Protestants of the town would attempt an assault of his person. To this end the town was divided into quarters under the responsibility of various captains. Villequier and several others led the military efforts in the town to protect the king.

=== Governor of Paris ===
Conscious of the dilution of the honour of the Ordre de Saint-Michel, Henri decided to establish a new order of chivalric honour in 1578. To this end he created the Ordre du Saint-Esprit in 1578. Villequier was among the favourites included in the first induction on 31 December 1578. Membership of this order required the performance of certain devotional practices. In 1579 the office of governor of the Île de France and the subsidiary governorship of Paris became vacant with the death of the duke of Montmorency. While rumours swirled that the king would give the office to his mother with Villequier as her lieutenant-general. In May 1580 Villequier received appointment as governor of the Île de France and Paris, he would hold this post until 13 May 1587 when it was ceded in favour of François d'O. This appointment gave him considerable credit, and he was able to secure large loans from the merchants of the city to support Henri's government. At this time he was actively involved in the king's council, often aligned with d'O. A further privilege of the office was the ability to attend debates held in Parlement, allowing him to represent the king's position in the court, and the municipal assemblies, a role he performed when the city was considering a large demand of 200,000 livres the king wished to gain from the capital.

=== Decline from prominence ===
While having a reputation as a fairly irreligious man, after hearing a sermon in 1581, the Papal nuncio reported that Villequier appeared moved, and was inclined towards yielding the two abbey's that he held, which had not been acquired in a canonically correct fashion. That same year Retz surrendered his position as first gentleman of the chamber to make way for Anne de Joyeuse who the king wished to place in the role. Villequier maintained his hold on the role, and as such during the 1580s the role was cycled in four month periods between Joyeuse, Épernon and Villequier. Joyeuse and Épernon would however be allowed to directly approach the king in his chamber. While Villequier had to wait in an antechamber before being granted access to the king. During a council meeting in 1584 the king became furious with the grande prieur de France, his illegitimate brother. Villequier, alongside Cheverny intervened in the priors defence. Their closeness to the king afforded them the ability to defy him.

With the rise of the second Ligue upon the death of Alençon in 1584, Villequier again took responsibilities to ensure the king's security. The guards of all the Parisian gates reported to Villequier on the days events and who had been coming and going from the capital.

== Sources ==
- Harding, Robert (1978). Anatomy of a Power Elite: the Provincial Governors in Early Modern France. Yale University Press.
- Jouanna, Arlette (1998). Histoire et Dictionnaire des Guerres de Religion. Bouquins.
- Knecht, Robert (2016). Hero or Tyrant? Henry III, King of France, 1574-1589. Routledge.
- Salmon, J.H.M (1975). Society in Crisis: France during the Sixteenth Century. Metheun & Co.
- Sutherland, Nicola (1962). The French Secretaries of State in the Age of Catherine de Medici. The Athlone Press.
