= François d'O =

French soldier and statesman

- seigneur de Fresne et de Maillebois
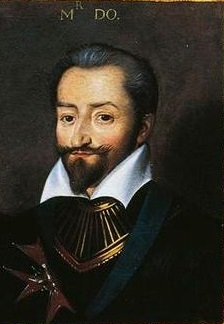
- Portrait of d'O by unknown artist
- Born: 1545/50
- Died: c. 1594
- Spouse: Charlotte-Catherine de Villequier

François d'O, seigneur de Fresne et de Maillebois (1545/50 – c. 1594) was a French soldier, statesman and favourite of Henri III. Rising to prominence through his association with the dauphin Henri, he served with the prince at the siege of La Rochelle. When Henri returned to France as king in 1574 d'O found himself quickly receiving advancement, first as master of the wardrobe and first gentleman of the chamber. Part of a particularly close group to Henri known as the Mignons, or to Henri 'Ma Troupe' he and several other Mignons attempted to kill Bussy d'Amboise for the king.

In 1578 he was further elevated to the post of surintendant des finances. Keen to re-assert authority over a province whose estates had recently demonstrated disloyalty, d'O was granted the captaincy of the town of Caen in his home province of Normandy. At this time d'O was a close confident of the king, regularly travelling with him on his excursions from Paris, with the king staying at his residence on occasion. By 1581 Henri increasingly had new favourites, such as Anne de Joyeuse and Jean Louis de Nogaret de La Valette also known as Épernon. D'O resented the favours lavished on these new men, in particular the opulent wedding arranged for Joyeuse in 1581. Épernon for his part loathed d'O and insulted him to the king. As a result d'O fell into disfavour with the crown, and was banned from court in late 1581 on the pretext of his addiction to gambling.

In 1583 the disgraced d'O was granted a temporary appointment as lieutenant-general of lower Normandy on condition that he soon pass it over to Matignon's son. Dissatisfied with the regime, d'O went into alliance with the Catholic Ligue in 1585 using his influence in Normandy to support the forces of Elbeuf against the crown. After a clash between Elbeuf's army and forces under Joyeuse a peace was agreed that was favourable to the Ligue, a term of which divested d'O of his command of Caen in return for his re-admission onto the kings conseil and an appointment as a Chevalier du Saint-Esprit. As a result he returned to favour and withdrew from involvement in the ligue.

In 1588 d'O played a central role in the events of the Day of the Barricades, his forces attempting to attack captains loyal to the liguer Henry I, Duke of Guise before elements of the population of Paris rose up against the king in favour of Guise. Instructed by the king to retreat with his forces to the Louvre d'O was harried by armed Parisians all the way back and feared for his life. Forced from Paris shortly after Henri was furious at his ministers who he blamed for leading him to be too conciliatory with the ligue. As a result d'O became a more central force in his administration. Shortly thereafter Henri arranged the assassination of Guise, before himself being assassinated. D'O came with the troops of Saint Cloud to Henri IV, offering them to him on condition he renounce Protestantism and lead a Catholic kingdom. Henri demurred but offered enough conciliatory remarks to secure d'O and the troops loyalty. Having served Henri for several years he died shortly after the king had entered Paris.

== Early life and family ==
Coming from a family of the Norman nobility, François d'O had a marriage arranged for him by Henri, setting him up with Charlotte-Catherine de Villequier daughter of René de Villequier.

== Reign of Henri III ==
=== Mignon ===
D'O was a close confident of Henri III, one of the four of ma troupe, alongside Saint-Sulpice, Quélus and d'Espinay. The group galvanised around Henri during the siege of La Rochelle in early 1573. In 1575, upon Henri's return to France from the Polish-Lithuanian Commonwealth, d'O was among the favourites who accompanied the king as he entered Lyon, around this time the group began to be known by contemporaries as Mignons. This term originally meant companions, however it began to take on a pejorative meaning as it was used by Henri's enemies. Henri appointed d'O as his master of the wardrobe and first gentleman of the chamber. D'O had a reputation for violence and in 1575 was responsible for the murder of a Huguenot nobleman. Saint Sulpice, Quélus and d'O attempted to kill Bussy d'Amboise, an enemy of Henri's, in 1578, they were however unsuccessful in their attempt.

=== Promotion and favour ===
In 1578 d'O was appointed by Henri as a second surintendant des finances, putting him in charge of France's fiscal system. Shortly thereafter d'O was granted the captaincy of Caen in the hopes he would represent a more reliable royal presence in the region in enforcing the royal will. Normandy had presented concerning addresses in the recent estates which had frustrated Henri.

=== Disgrace ===
Henri regularly travelled out from Paris with d'O when he needed a break from the city, as in February 1580 when he retired to Saint-Germain with d'O Joyeuse and Bernard de la Vallette. He also frequented d'O's house as in May 1581 on his return from a visit to Joyeuse at Montrésor, he lodged at d'O's residence on the rue de la Plâtrière. On 4 October 1581, d'O was banished from court, on the grounds that he had been 'gambling to excess.' D'O had already grown alienated from the king by the favour shown to Joyeuse in his lavish September marriage. He tried to appeal to Catherine de Medici to get the king to change his mind, but the king was unmoved. Alongside his gambling habit, d'O had also fallen out with the kings other favourite La Valette, who insulted him to the king.

After the re-consolidation of Normandy into a single governorship under Henri's favourite Anne de Joyeuse in 1583, d'O was granted the role of one of the lieutenant-generals of the key province. It was only to be a temporary appointment, as Matignon had only vacated his office in the province on condition his son would receive the lieutenant-generalcy.

=== Liguer ===
By 1585 d'O had grown disgruntled with Henri, finding himself banished from court and denied royal favour. As a result he attached himself to the Ligue movement that was growing in Normandy, supporting Elbeuf in his revolt. The forces under Elbeuf united with those under Charles II de Cossé, Duke of Brissac and skirmished with Joyeuse. Shortly after this engagement peace would be negotiated largely a capitulation in favour of the ligue. As part of the peace d'O was brought back into royal favour, being made Chevalier du Saint-Esprit and returned to the conseil des affaires in return for relinquishing his governorship of Caen and association with the Ligue.

=== Day of the Barricades ===
D'O, in his position as governor of Paris played a key role in the opening events of the Day of the Barricades, on Henri's instruction he conducted sweeps of the city attempting to pick up Guisard captains. This quickly devolved into skirmishes between his troops and those loyal to Guise. Guise went to the Louvre to complain but Henri turned from him. The situation quickly fell out of royal control in the following days, Henri changed his policy, instructing d'O and other allies to draw the Swiss troops off the streets back to the Louvre in the hopes this would calm Paris. D'O and Corse begged the people to let them pass as they reached the Pont Notre Dame the troops were confronted by an angry crowd, throwing down their weapons the Swiss and their commanders begged for mercy. Their further withdrawal would be under fire, now receiving arquebus shots from windows. The king and d'O, among other loyalists were forced to flee the city, travelling first to Saint-Cloud and then on to Chartres. D'O, speaking later on his experience confided that he had never been as in fear for his life as he had been trying to withdraw the Swiss from the streets.

Henri, furious at the Ligue coup, sacked all his ministers, who had largely advocated for a conciliatory policy. In their place Henri chose to govern through his favourites, including d'O, Chenailles and Montholon.

=== Assassination of the Duke of Guise ===
Having decided to do away with Guise after this coup, Henri settled on assassinating him during a stay at Blois in December 1588. D'O was among those invited to a special council, under the pretext it would be the last before the king wintered at La Noue. Upon arriving at the council, Guise found himself called off into another room, after which he was promptly murdered.

Unable to enter Paris in the wake of the assassination of Guise, Henri laid siege to the city in alliance with Navarre, when he was himself assassinated by a radical Catholic monk, Jacques Clément. As he lay on his death bed he was surrounded by many of his old favourites, including Épernon and d'O.

== Reign of Henri IV ==
Upon Henri's immediate assumption of power, d'O conveyed the demands of the captains assembled as Saint-Cloud for their loyalty to him as king. Henri was to abjure Protestantism, ban all Protestant worship and only allow Catholics in office. Henri did not accept these terms, and was able to convince them to support him with a promise that he would support the Catholic faith and call a general council on the religious question.

With Henri IV having converted to Catholicism and assumed control of Paris, he sought to reconcile the Liguer Parlementaires with the royalist faction of the court. D'O was sent with cavalry to bring those who had been exiled from Paris back to the city from Longjumeau.

In the same year, 1594, d'O died. The finances of the kingdom which he had been singularly responsible for devolved back to the conseil des finances.

== Sources ==
- Carroll, Stuart (2005). Noble Power during the French Wars of Religion: The Guise Affinity and the Catholic Cause in Normandy. Cambridge University Press.
- Carroll, Stuart (2009). Martyrs and Murderers: The Guise Family and the Making of Europe. Oxford University Press.
- Harding, Robert (1978). Anatomy of a Power Elite: the Provincial Governors in Early Modern France. Yale University Press.
- Knecht, Robert (1998). Catherine de' Medici. Routledge.
- Knecht, Robert (2016). Hero or Tyrant? Henry III, King of France, 1574-1589. Routledge.
- Knecht, Robert (2010). The French Wars of Religion, 1559-1598. Routledge.
- Roelker, Nancy (1996). One King, One Faith: The Parlement of Paris and the Religious Reformation of the Sixteenth Century. University of California Press.
- Salmon, J.H.M (1975). Society in Crisis: France during the Sixteenth Century. Metheun & Co.
