= Jean de Nogaret de La Valette =

French light cavalry officer (1527–1575)

Jean de Nogaret de La Valette (1527– December 18, 1575) was a captain and then maître de camp (camp master) of the French light cavalry (1562) and Lieutenant General of Guyenne (1574). He fought in the battles of Dreux (1562), Moncontour and Jarnac (1569) and the siege of La Rochelle (1573).

He was born at Caumont-Guienne, the son of Pierre Nogaret de La Valette (1497–1553) and Marguerite de L'Isle de St. Aignan (1499–1535), and fought at the siege of La Rochelle.

With his wife, Jeanne de St Lary de Bellegarde, he had:

- Bernard de Nogaret, seigneur de La Valette (1553-1592).
- Jean Louis de Nogaret, duc d'Épernon (1554-1642).
- Catherine de Nogaret, married Henri de Joyeuse (1565-1587).
- Hélėne de Nogaret, married Jacques de Goth (1568-).
- Anne-Marie de Nogaret, married Charles II de Luxembourg (1570-1605).

== Sources ==
- Le Roux, Nicolas (2000). La Faveur du Roi: Mignons et Courtisans au Temps des Derniers Valois. Champ Vallon.
