= Roger I de Saint-Lary =

French soldier and officer (1525–1579)

- Seigneur de Bellegarde
- portrait thought to be Roger de Saint-Lary,
- Other titles: Marshal of France
- Born: January 1522; Kingdom of France
- Died: 10 December 1579 (aged 57); Dauphiné, Kingdom of France
- Spouse: Marguerite de Saluces
- Issue: César de Saint-Lary

Roger de Saint-Lary, baron de Bellegarde (1525-1579) was a soldier and Marshal of France. Rising to prominence as a favourite of Henri III he was quickly elevated to high office, becoming Marshal in 1574. Tasked with leading the main royal army in the fifth war of religion, he was not able to achieve success and the army disintegrated while he attempted to besiege Livron. Fighting again for the crown in 1577 he remained unable to achieve notable success on the battlefield. Having attempted to seize the Marquisate of Saluzzo which he had relinquished in hopes of attaining the governorship of Languedoc, he was granted the territory in a mediated settlement overseen by the duke of Savoy in October 1579. Several months later he would be dead.

== Reign of Charles IX ==
In 1562 Bellegarde began his career as a client of Retz, as a result he spent much of the following years in Italy. He attached himself to the brother of the king, Anjou's company during the abortive siege of La Rochelle shortly prior to Anjou's election as king of the Polish-Lithuanian Commonwealth.

Bellegarde travelled with Anjou as he went east to assume the mantle of king of the Commonwealth, Anjou found himself ill at ease with the Polish nobility he was supposed to be ruling over, and increasingly spent time sequestered in Bellegarde company. The closeness of Henri and Bellegarde frustrated Louis Gonzaga, Duke of Nevers who put out, returned to France, excusing himself on the grounds the weather was not to his liking. Catherine to became upset by their closeness upon reports from Villequier, and wrote to her son to convey her displeasure.

== Reign of Henri III ==
=== Commonwealth ===
With Anjou's return to France as king Henri III, Bellegarde was to be sent to the Commonwealth, as a special ambassador to the country to smooth things over. Accompanying him would be the Guise grandee Elbeuf. Their departure was however indefinitely delayed due to the dire economic straights the kingdom was in, as Henri sought desperately to float his government financially.

=== Livron ===
With war resumed against the politiques in 1574, in particular against Marshal Damville who based himself out of Languedoc. The court assembled an army 18,000 strong to head south along the Rhône and confront him. This army was put under the command of Bellegarde, who had recently been elevated as Marshal by the new king over the protestations of Catherine. In early October Bellegarde and his army besieged Le Pouzin in a costly effort that sapped the royal armies strength. The town subdued the army would move on to siege Livron from December to January 1575 which proved to be an even more costly effort. The garrison repulsed several attempted assaults and despite a visit from Henri to the siege lines, the soldiers began deserting en masse, angry at the lack of pay. Bellegarde had to withdraw his forces from the town before they melted away completely and received much criticism for his handling of the army. Bellegarde blamed the failure of the siege on a dispute between the forge masters who produced shot for the artillery and the crown. The crown had baulked at the prices demanded by the cartel and only when Henri threatened to remove their privileges did they agree to lower the prices of the shot, leading to much delay regarding the artillery.

=== Languedoc ===
Pushed towards a new civil war by the Ligue dominated Estates General of 1576 Henri conducted frantic diplomacy to try to avoid another conflict, succeeding in peeling away the Politiques under Damville from their former Huguenot allies. Bellegarde was again tasked with facing the Huguenots in Languedoc. He had little more success than in the prior war, with François de Coligny harrying the forces under his and Damville's command. The conflict would however be brought to an end with the Treaty of Bergerac before a pitched battle could be fought.

Keen to neutralise Damville now peace was restored, Henri pressured him to hand over his governorship of Languedoc to Bellegarde, in exchange for Bellegarde's Marquisate of Saluzzo. In preparation to receive his new office Bellegarde resigned his commission, however Damville refused the exchange, leading to Bellegarde attempting to seize his old command back by force with the assistance of the Protestant Lesdiguières.

=== Dauphiné ===
In 1579 Bellegarde outlined the steps he felt were necessary to ensure a peace edict was properly abided by in Dauphiné. He declared that to do so successfully required the dismantling of garrisons and fortifications and the restitution of worship rights for communities of both faiths who had been denied them in war time. Further required was the expulsion of foreign troops that had been brought into the province to fight the war and the termination of all levies that were not royally raised. Finally the chambre de l'édit must be allowed to operate free of interference with biconfessional commissioners with local commanders of each faith acting as enforcers for their various judgements.

As peasant rebellions bloomed in 1579, some lords in Dauphiné sought to turn them to their advantage, recruiting them to fight in aristocratic feuds. Bellegarde wrote to the Protestant noble Lesdiguières cautioning him against doing this. Noting this would have long term impacts on the ability to enforce the social order. Catherine concurred with Bellegarde's analysis, critiquing Colas for similar actions.

In March 1579 Bellegarde had re-occupied Saluzzo, successfully having seized it from the governor Charles de Birague. Henri, frustrated at this blatant insubordination considered sending in an army to crush Bellegarde, but fearful this would cause a civil war, mediation by the duke of Savoy was chosen instead. On 17 October an agreement favourable to Bellegarde had been reached under the dukes guidance. After begging for the kings forgiveness Bellegarde was granted the marquisate again as his territory. Several months later he would be dead.

== Sources ==
- Roberts, Penny (2013). Peace and Authority during the French Religious Wars c.1560-1600. Palgrave Macmillan.
- Knecht, Robert (1998). Catherine de' Medici. Routledge.
- Knecht, Robert (2016). Hero or Tyrant? Henry III, King of France, 1574-1589. Routledge.
- Salmon, J.H.M (1975). Society in Crisis: France during the Sixteenth Century. Metheun & Co.
- Thompson, James (1909). The Wars of Religion in France 1559-1576: The Huguenots, Catherine de Medici and Philip II. Chicago University Press.
- Wood, James (2002). The Kings Army: Warfare, Soldiers and Society during the Wars of Religion in France, 1562-1576. Cambridge University Press.
