= Jean Louis de Nogaret de La Valette =

French nobleman (1554–1642)

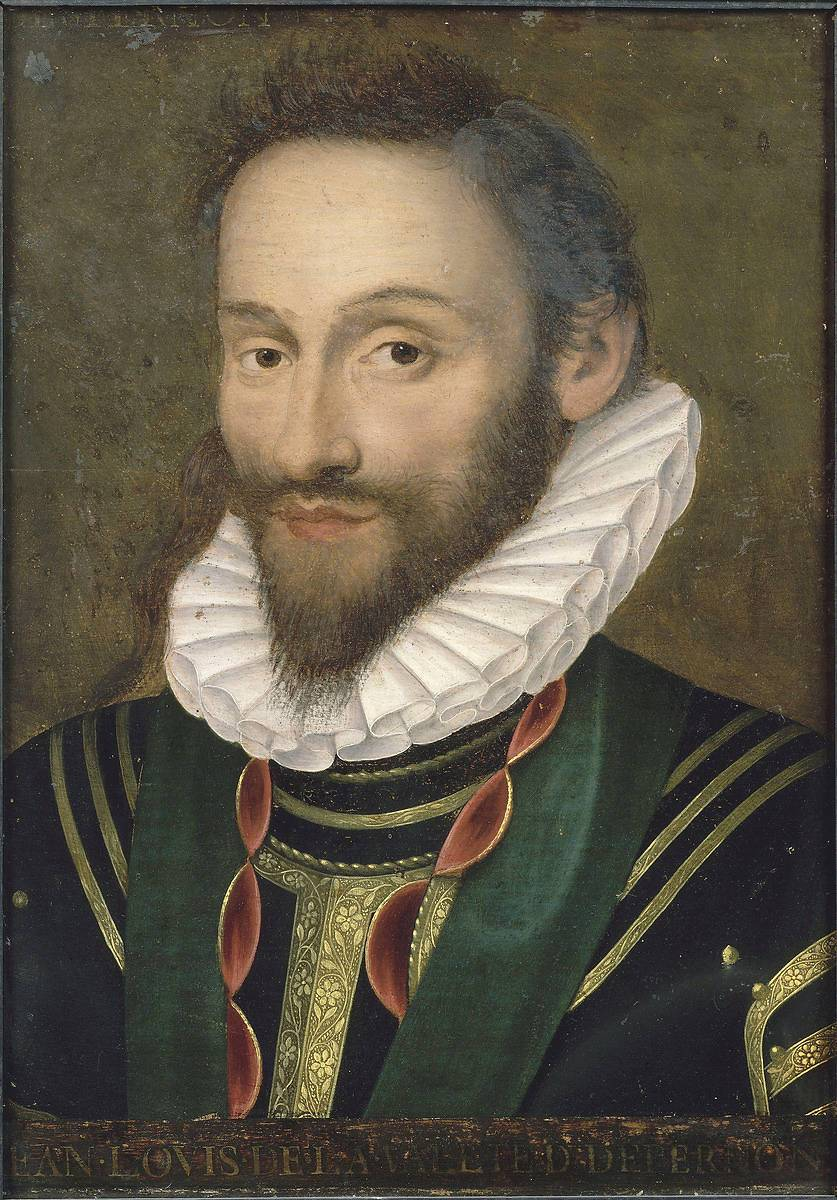
Portrait of Nogaret de La Valette by an unknown painter

Coat of arms of Jean Louis de Nogaret

Jean Louis de Nogaret de La Valette (1554–1642), created Duke of Épernon, was a powerful member of the French nobility at the turn of the 17th century. He was deeply involved in plots and politics throughout his life.

== Life ==
He was born at Château de Caumont in Gascony, the son of Jean de Nogaret de La Valette and Jeanne de Saint-Lary de Bellegarde. His father and grandfather both being military men, it was natural that young Jean Louis would choose a soldier's life. He fought on the Catholic side in the French Wars of Religion; at the siege of La Rochelle, he first came to the notice of the duc d'Anjou, the future Henry III of France.

By December 1578, Nogaret had been accepted into Henri's most intimate circle of favourites, Les Mignons. The king of Navarre sold him the town of Épernon. In 1581 Épernon would be raised in his favour by the king of France, Henri III, to the rank of a duchy. Nogaret thus became the first duc d'Épernon. The new duke of Épernon was highly favored by Henry, who showered titles upon him, among them maître de camp of the Champagne regiment (1579), Governor of La Fère (1580), Colonel-general of the infantry (1581), First Gentleman of the King's Chamber (1582), Chevalier de l’Ordre du Saint-Esprit, Governor of Boulonnais, Loches, Lyon, Metz and its surrounding areas (1583), Chevalier des Ordres du roi (1584), and Governor of Provence (1586). At the death of the duc de Joyeuse (1587) he was awarded the titles of Admiral of France, Governor of Normandy, of Caen, and of Le Havre.

After the assassination of Henry III in 1589, Épernon opposed the accession of Henry of Navarre (Henry IV of France) and attempted to install an independent government in Provence. His attempt failed and in 1596 he was obliged to submit himself to the king, which he did. He had not forgiven or forgotten, however, and in 1610 he was involved in the conspiracy that resulted in the assassination of Henry IV by Ravaillac, who lodged, in his preparatory visits to Paris, with Épernon's mistress, Charlotte du Tillet. He played a large part in the immediate acceptance of Henri's widow, Marie de' Medici, as regent, her son Louis XIII being then too young to rule.

The duc d'Épernon was active in government until 1618 or so; in 1617, he participated in the persecution and murder of the Huguenots in Guienne. He was named military governor of Guienne in 1622, where he lived quietly for more than ten years in the Château de Cadillac. In 1634, however, his deteriorating relationship with Henri de Sourdis (brother and successor of Cardinal François de Sourdis) led to a public altercation in which Épernon struck Sourdis. Furious, Sourdis demanded his excommunication and Épernon was disgraced and exiled. He gave up his post at Guienne in 1638 and died in the Château de Loches in January 1642 at the age of 88.

Jean Louis and his wife Marguerite were buried at Saint-Blaise de Cadillac, Gironde. The tomb, built of marble and surmounted by a winged female figure in bronze, was inspired by the great royal tombs at Basilica of Saint Denis and by the monument of Anne de Montmorency. The tomb was destroyed in 1792 and the bronze statue of Fame by Pierre Biard now resides in the Louvre; other fragments of the tomb, including marble heads of the duke and duchess, are in the museum of Aquitaine, in Bordeaux.

== Issue ==
Marguerite de Foix-Candale was a wealthy heiress (1567-1593) of the House of Foix, and they had four sons:

- Henry, duke of Foix-Candale (1591–1639);
- Bernard, duc d'Épernon (1592–1661);
- Pierre (1589–?),
- Louis (1593–1639), cardinal de La Valette.

With his second wife, Anne Castelet de Monier, he had a son, Jean-Louis (1600–?), known as the Sieur de La Valette (Knight of Valette).

He also had three other natural children with Diane (the sister of Gabrielle d'Estrées): a daughter Louise, and two sons, Louis, bishop of Mirepoix, then bishop of Carcassonne and Bernard, prior of Bellefonds.

== See also ==
- Bernard de Nogaret de La Valette d'Épernon
- Guillaume de Nogaret
- Jean Parisot de la Valette
- Les Mignons
