= Antoine de Silly =

French noble and courtier (died 1609)

- comte de La Rochepot
- Coat of Arms
- Died: 1609
- Noble family: Maison de Silly
- Father: Louis de Silly, seigneur de La Roche-Guyon
- Mother: Anne de Laval

Antoine de Silly, comte de La Rochepot and baron de Montmirail (died 1609) was a French noble, governor, courtier and soldier during the French Wars of Religion. He entered the ducal household of the duc d'Anjou in 1571. In 1574 Anjou became king Henri III. La Rochepot found himself alienated from Henri by the arrangement of a marriage between a royal favourite and a noble promised to his brother. He therefore affiliated himself with the king's brother Alençon and was involved in his escape from court on 14 February 1578. He was with Alençon at Angers as the duc (duke) planned his designs as related to Nederland. Alençon dispatched La Rochepot to conduct negotiations with the graaf van Lalaing (count of Lalaing) by which Alençon would be granted territory in return for military aid. He aided in the recruitment of soldiers for the expedition despite the prohibition of Henri against the enterprise. The expedition would be a failure, and Alençon would return to France in December.

With the Spanish putting Cambrai to siege in 1580, Alençon again made plans to intervene, to relieve the siege. La Rochepot brought an advanced guard of Alençon's cavalry then was present for a general muster of Alençon's forces, aiding in the recruitment effort alongside the seigneur de Fervaques, succeeding in raising a force around 10,000 strong. Though prohibited by the crown from going to Cambrai's aid, Alençon's army went anyway, and relieved the siege of Cambrai. Subsequently, establishing himself over Nederland, Alençon found himself unsatisfied with the amount of power he had, and attempted a coup to seize the city of Antwerp. It was a disaster, his army being destroyed, and La Rochepot taken prisoner among other nobles in his retinue. After the death of Alençon in 1584 he changed his loyalty to the royal cause, and was rewarded by Henri by being made governor of Anjou. After the assassination of the duc de Guise in 1588 started a war between the crown and the Catholic ligue (League) La Rochepot successfully held Angers for the crown, besting an effort by the ligue to take over the city. He then campaigned against the ligue with limited success in Anjou. In 1595 he was made a chevalier of the Ordre du Saint-Esprit (Order of Saint-Esprit). In 1600 he became the French ambassador to España but after his ambassadorial residence was stormed by Spanish forces in 1601 he was recalled to France. He remained governor of Anjou until his death in 1609.

== Early life and family ==
Antoine de Silly was the son of Louis de Silly seigneur de La Roche-Guyon, baron de Louvois and Anne de Laval dame d'Aquigny and La Rochepot, daughter of Guy XVI de Laval and Anne de Montmorency. The couple were married in 1539.

The Silly were part of the noblesse seconde (secondary nobility). He had an elder brother the seigneur de La Roche-Guyon.

La Rochepot was a favourite of the duc de Lorraine.

In July 1585, La Rochepot was married to a member of the Humières family.

== Reign of Charles IX ==
=== Anjou ===
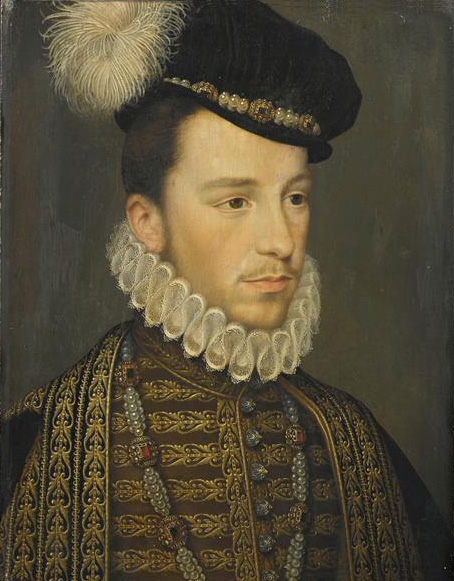
Duc d'Anjou and subsequently king of France as Henri III

In 1571, La Rochepot was part of the ducal household of the duc d'Anjou, brother to king Charles IX. As part of his responsibilities he received a pension of 300 livres.

== Reign of Henri III ==
The marriage of the royal favourite Saint-Luc to Jeanne de Cossé on 9 February 1578, the latter of whom had been promised to La Rochepot's brother the seigneur de La Roche-Guyon aroused the indignation against the crown of not only La Roche-Guyon but also La Rochepot.

=== Alençon ===
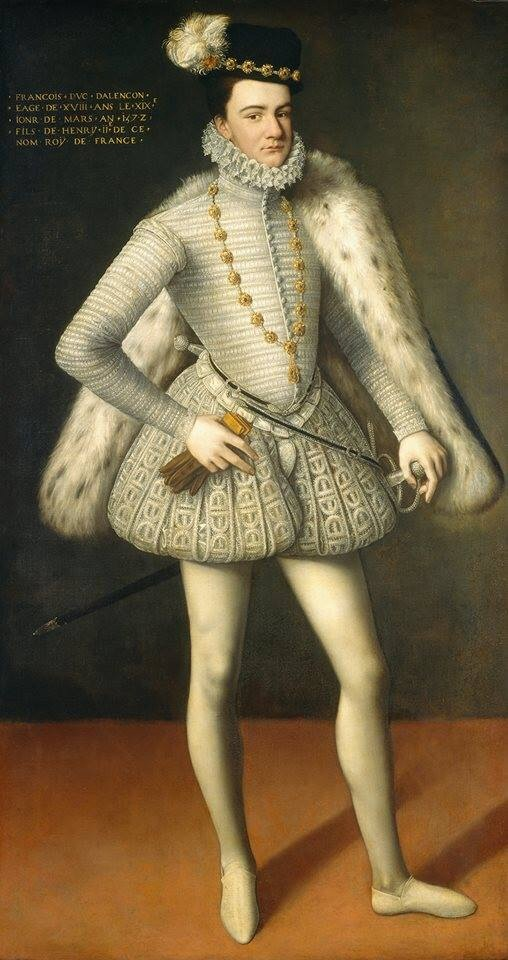
Duc d'Alençon and brother to Henri III

Henri (formally the duc d'Anjou)'s brother Alençon refused to attend the wedding of Saint-Luc but was persuaded to attend the ball in the evening. At the ball, a favourite of his brother the king (Louis de Maugiron) subjected him to personal insult, hoping to push him into open revolt. Alençon resolved with his favourite La Châtre to depart court in the coming days. His preparations to leave were not subtle, and his chambers were invaded by his mother Catherine and one of the captains of the royal guard Jean de Losses on the evening of 10 February to stop him fleeing. Several of his favourites (Bussy d'Amboise, Simiers and La Rochepot were locked in the Louvre, while La Châtre was arrested. In the following days his favourites were released, though kept under surveillance to ensure they would not get into any troubles. Public acts of reconciliation were undertaken between Bussy d'Amboise and his rival the king's favourite Caylus. This reconciliation was an illusion, and on 14 February Alençon escaped court with his favourites Bussy d'Amboise, La Châtre, Simiers and La Rochepot.

Alençon established himself in his appanage of Anjou at Angers. Catherine went out to try and persuade him to return to court, but Alençon feigned illness and refused. By this time his household contained very few Protestants. Those in his household included Bussy d'Amboise his premier gentilhomme de la chambre (first gentleman of the ducal chamber); Simiers chambellan et maître de la garde robe (chamberlain and master of the wardrobe); La Châtre, the seigneur de Fervaques, the baron de Rosne, La Fin and La Rochepot (who also served as his chambellan) among others. Soon after, none of the men who had been installed in his household by his mother Catherine remained.

Alençons various favourites made a poor impression in Angers. This reached its peak with the 'defenestration of Angers'. At a banquet hosted by the bishop Guillaume Ruzé, several members of his household (who had been drinking) began insulting the bishop then fighting among themselves. The incident ended with several of the members of his household being thrown out the windows.

Towards the end of February Alençon dispatched La Rochepot to court to assure the king of his loyalty. La Rochepot also carried a letter intended to be published more broadly, in which Alençon complained of the domination of the kingdom by a clique of young favourites and the general mistreatment of the nobility.

=== First Dutch enterprise ===
Alençon was frustrated he had yet to receive a formal offer from the States-General of Nederland, and therefore decided to deal specifically with the one state that had demonstrated particular interest in him. To this end, he dispatched two members of his household to negotiate with the state of Hainault on 28 March 1578. These representatives were La Rochepot and the seigneur de Pruneaux. They were to deal solely with the graaf van Lalaing (count of Lalaing), the governor of the province. They were to present Alençon's offer of 10,000 foot and 2,000 horse in return for Alençon receiving several frontier towns, among them Mons. Alençon would protect Protestantism, and respect the pacification of Ghent.

Catherine and Henri were horrified at the idea Alençon might bring France into war with España and worked to reassure the Spanish ambassador that they would not permit him to lead an expedition into Nederland. Catherine began negotiations with the prins van Oranj (prince of Oranj) to convince him to oppose Alençon's intervention in Nederland. Rochepot and Pruneaux were however in negotiations with Lalaing and Alençon was raising an army.

On 7 May 1578 La Rochepot and Pruneaux's negotiations reached an understanding with Lalaing at Mons. The more general States-General of Nederland remained divided on Alençon. Alençon dispatched another agent, named Dammartin to work out the remaining difficulties with the States-General. As a sign of his goodwill, he sent a small military force to Mons, Henri desperately tried to stop the progress of the force and forbid anyone to enter military service without royal permission. However it was too late and Alençon made his way to join the force at Mons. The States was apprehensive, and despite Alençon's protestations of support were not as willing to endorse his actions as Hainault had been in its dealings with La Rochepot and Pruneaux.

Alençon was short of funds to establish the full army he had promised Hainault, and therefore resolved to raise quick money by alienating the rights to income sources from his appanage, an act he was granted permission to undertake from Henri. Meanwhile, in the States, Oranj reasoned it was better for Alençon to be in service to the entire States rather than just the Catholic Hainault, and Lalaing. The hertog van Aarschot (duke of Aarschot) was dispatched to greet Alençon and seek a treaty with him. On 23 July Alençon wrote happily to the States that he would be dispatching delegates with full powers to conclude a treaty within the next 24 hours.

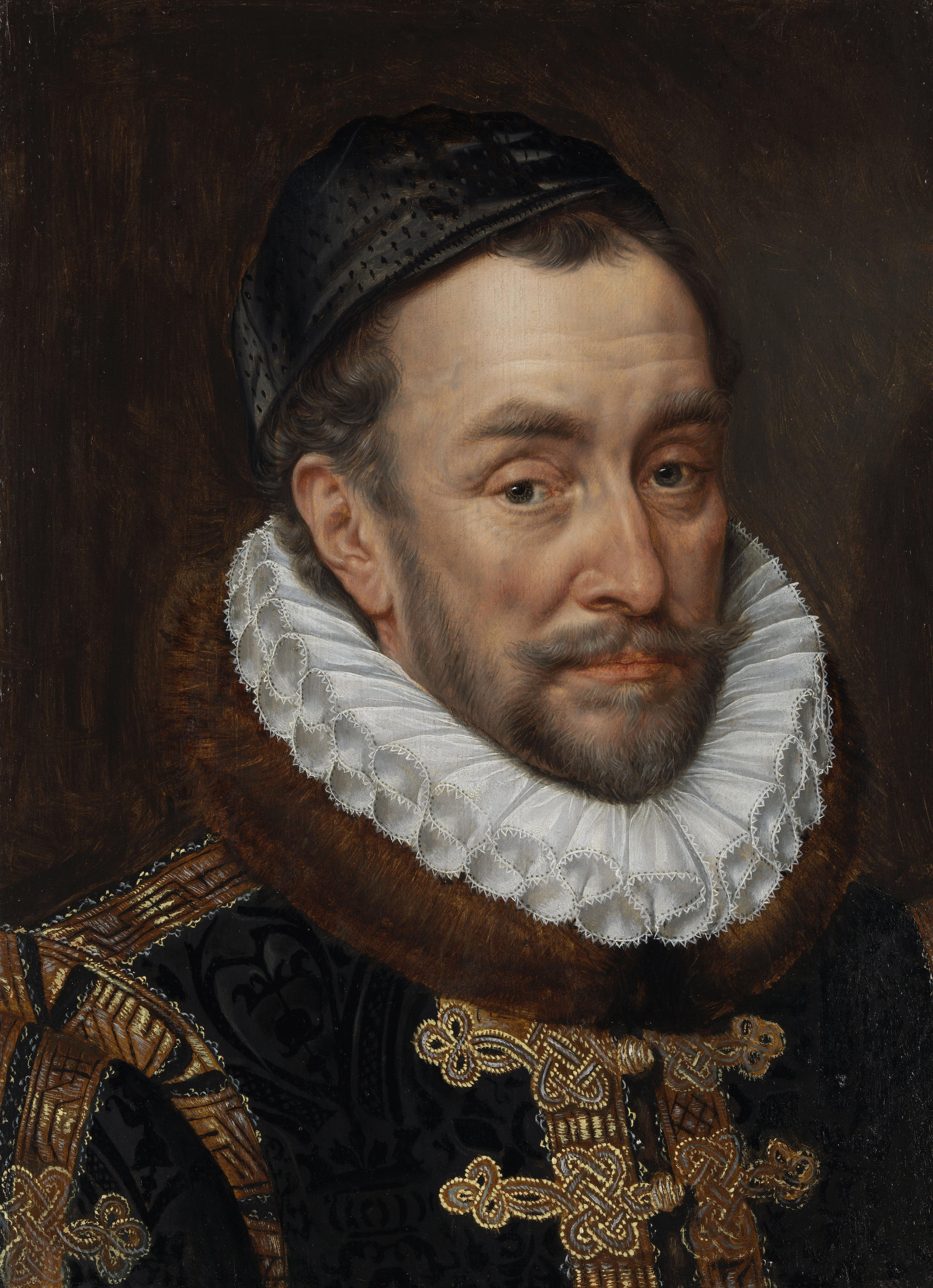
Prins van Oranj one of the key grandees of the rebel Spanish Nederland who undertook the agreement with Alençon

La Rochepot arrived in Mons within a week with around 3,000 men, far less than Alençon had initially been offering. Bussy d'Amboise and François de La Noue met with Oranj to discuss the religious question on 7 August. On 13 August a deal was reached between Alençon and the States-General. He would provide the troops agreed by his deal with Hainault, and work on Elizabeth I to persuade her to align with the rebellious States. He would also not interfere with the internal government of Nederland. In return, he received the title "defender of the liberty of the Netherlands against the tyranny of the Spanish and their allies" and the towns of Le Quesnoy, Landrecy and Bavay, he was further declared to be the first choice of the States to replace Felipe II as king if they decided not to be ruled by him. Ultimately he departed Nederland in December, his army having disintegrated and with little support from the States.

Meanwhile, on 27 April 1578 a famous duel took place between favourites of the king and those of the duc de Guise at court. As a result of this several favourites of the king died, including the comte de Caylus who lingered for a while before dying on 29 May. La Rochepot reported the news of this turn of events to Alençon's representatives at Mons on 7 June. He characterised it to them as part of a larger pattern of violence in the court.

=== Cambrai and the second Dutch enterprise ===
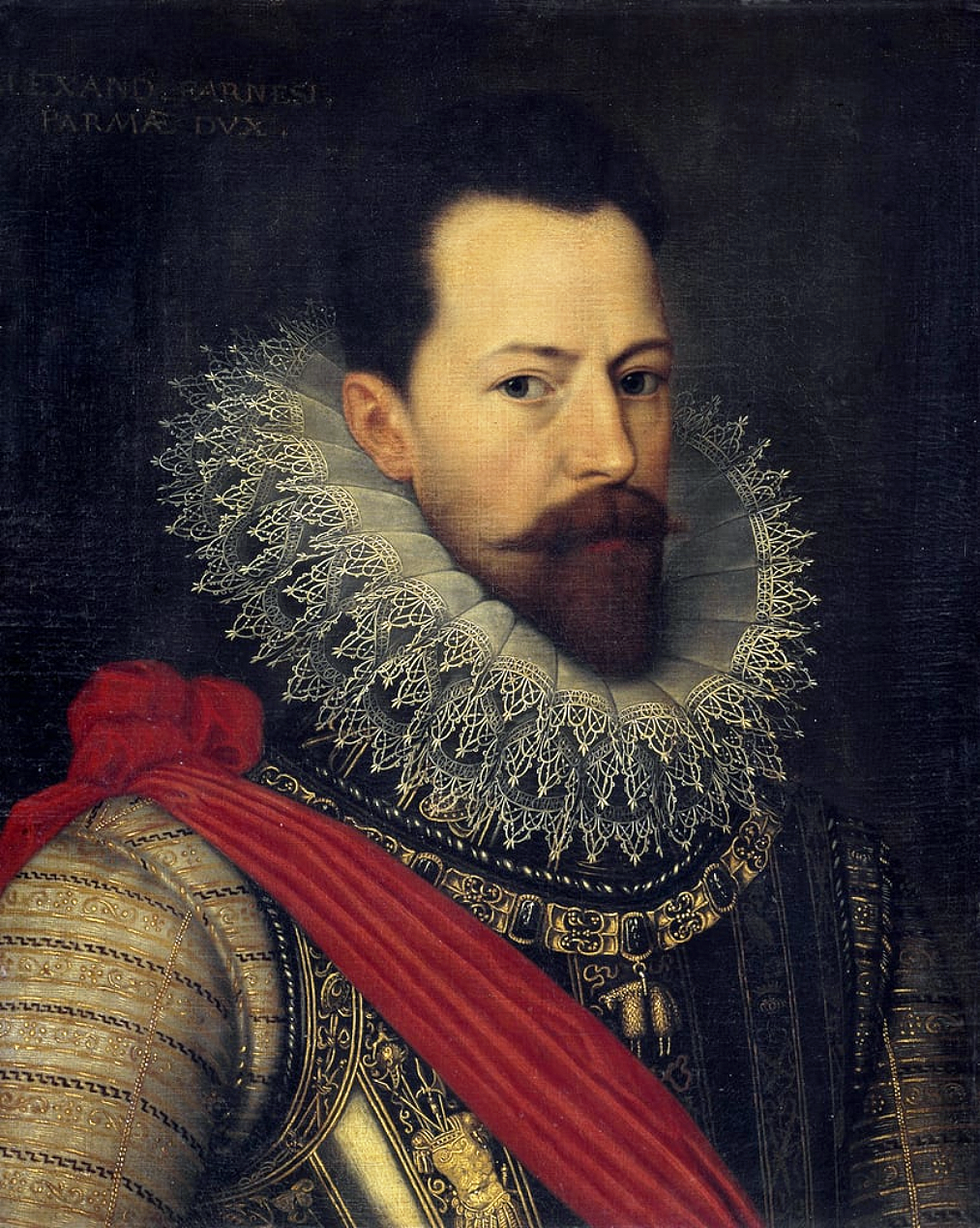
Duca di Parma who served as a Spanish general in Spanish Nederland and attempted to besiege Cambrai

Despite the prohibitions of his mother and Henri, and his promises to remain in Guyenne for several months, he despatched La Rochepot in December 1580 with a small cavalry to make an approach to Cambrai. Alençon was determined to relieve the siege of Cambrai (Spanish Nederland), which was being besieged by the duca di Parma (duke of Parma). According to the crown, Alençon had at his disposal around 2500 men, far less than the besieging army, the prince's mother therefore tried to persuade him to cancel his plans. She met him in Alençon from 12 to 15 May 1581 and tried to reason with him. The various favourites of Alençon mocked Catherine during the interviews. Alençon was not dissuaded and departed to Château-Thierry where Protestant and Catholic seigneurs were assembling in favour of his plans. Among them were the duc d'Elbeuf, the vicomte de Turenne, the former royal favourite Saint-Luc, the governor of Bourges La Châtre, La Guiche and La Rochepot. By July La Rochepot and the seigneur de Fervaques had experienced some successes in recruiting and the army was closer to 10,000 in number, though it lacked experienced officers. The cross-confessional army was highly disorganised and took to pillaging the French countryside like an invading army. La Rochepot refused to serve under the command of the seigneur de Fervaques, on account of his 'modest social origin'. Another of Alençon's favourites, Bonnivet proposed that Fervaques be replaced with someone of suitable birth.

Alençons force advanced to La Fère on 7 August where again Catherine met them to try and dissuade her son from the enterprise, she brought with her Marshal Matignon who told him that he was leading his army into a disaster. Alençon furiously responded that if it were not for the presence of his mother, he would have Matignon beaten and then thrown out the window.

Realising nothing would stop him, she ordered Jean de Puygaillard who commanded the royal forces in Picardie to escort him to Cambrai. With the assistance of this royal force, Alençon's motley army arrived at Cambrai, and successfully lifted the siege.

The duc de Guise, sharing many clients with Alençon (among them, members of the maison de Silly) was keen to reconcile with the 'daring prince' at this time.

On 19 February 1582 Alençon entered Antwerp in his capacity as the new hertog van Brabant (duke of Brabant). He signed a treaty with the Dutch States General, however he was frustrated, feeling that this agreement limited his authority over his new territories. He therefore attempted to take Antwerp by force, on 17 January 1583 his forces were bested by the Antwerp militia. 1500 of his men were killed in the debacle, and four of his favourites were taken prisoner, among them Fervaques and La Rochepot.

=== Governor of Anjou ===
On 10 June 1584, Alençon, prince of Nederland, duc d'Anjou, Touraine and Berry, who had been plagued by tuberculosis died. His death generally caused a constitutional crisis for France. By this death, La Rochepot was left without his patron. Henri co-opted him into the royal party by appointing him as governor of Anjou. He would remain loyal to the crown during the Catholic ligue (League) crisis, both due to the gifts he received from the crown, and because he was involved in legal disputes over his Parisian hôtel with the duc de Guise.

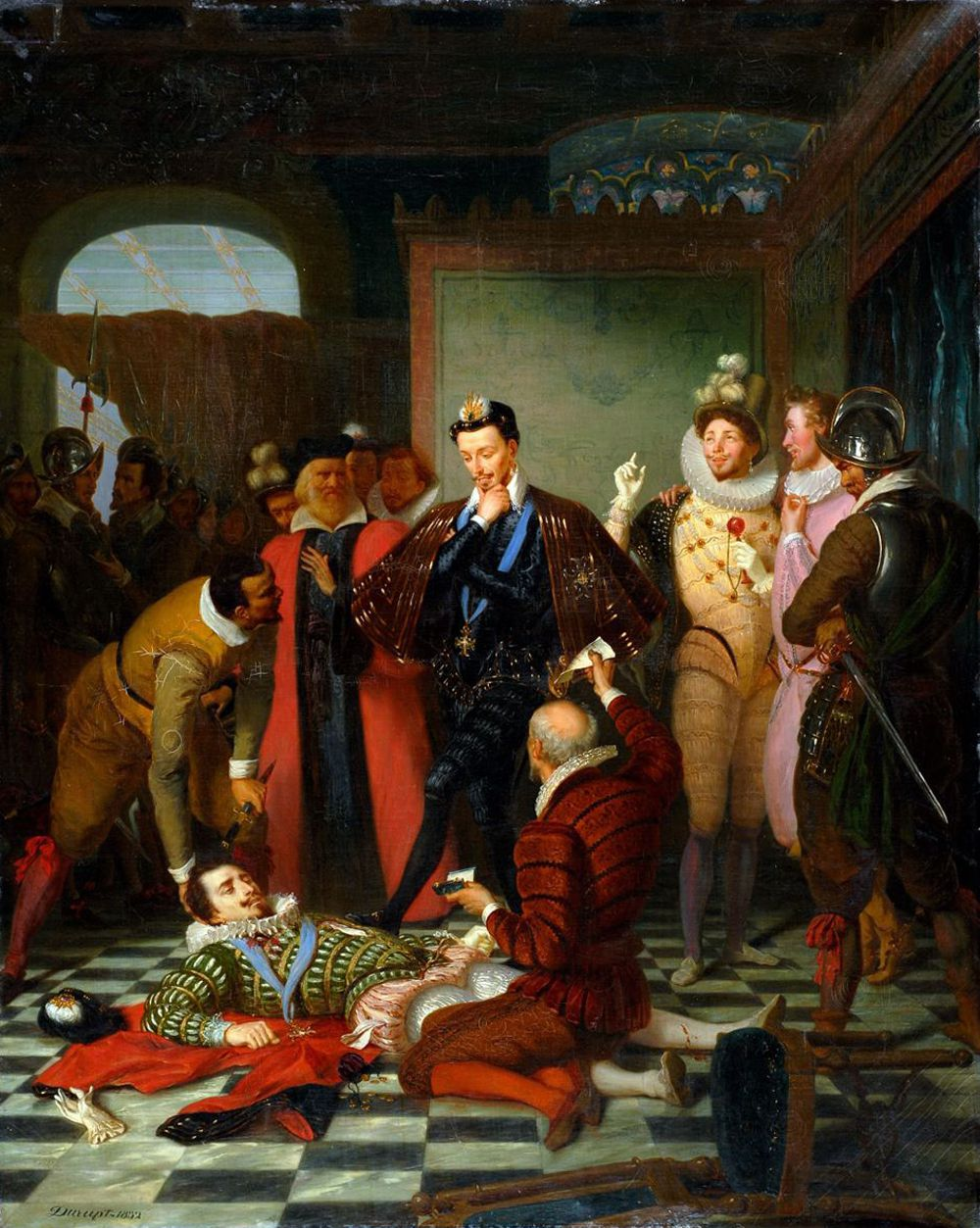
Assassination of the duc de Guise in 1588

Henri resolved in December 1588 of the necessity to be rid of the ligueur (leaguer) duc de Guise if he was to maintain his authority, and therefore had the duc assassinated on 23 December. In the wake of this act, much of Catholic France rose up in fury, with many cities defecting to the Ligue. One of the few areas Henri could count on was the valley of the Loire, where with the exception of Nantes and Orléans the majority of cities (La Charité, Beaugency, Blois, Amboise, Tours, Saumur and Angers held for the royal cause.

=== Angers crisis ===
This was not uncontested however, and Angers was greatly agitated by news of the assassination of the duc de Guise. Fiery preaching could be heard in the cathedral, rumours spread that the city was about to be betrayed to the Protestants. The people of Angers armed themselves and sent a delegation to their governor La Rochepot to ensure he swear his loyalty to the Catholic ligue. La Rochepot stalled, claiming he needed to discuss matters with the mayor. The mayor summoned the captains of Angers, the clergy and the magistrates, and all agreed of the importance of affiliating with the ligueur Sainte-Union and expel Protestants from the city. Unlike other cities (such as Le Mans) this was an affiliation led by the notables of the city. Another delegation was dispatched to La Rochepot, who informed them that he could not decide matters alone, and needed the consent of the governor of the château Puycharic. Puycharic was in less of a mood to compromise with the ligueurs and demanded the barricades be dismantled, city be disarmed and the ligueur commanders Boisdauphin and the comte de Brissac be expelled from the suburbs. A coup was attempted on 20 February, with Catholics of the city attempting to seize the château. This effort was a failure.

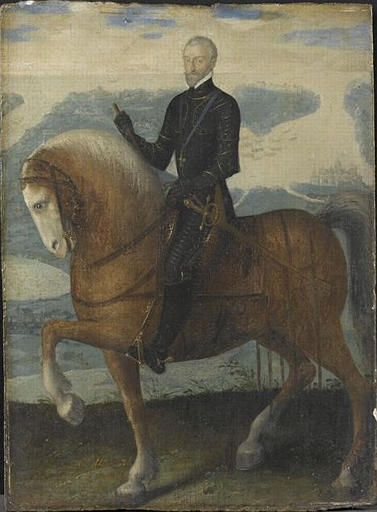
Marshal d'Aumont, royalist commander who would play a key role in the Angers crisis of 1589

For a while this uneasy situation continued without a breaking confrontation, the two governors doing their best to channel the ligueur fervour into religious pursuits as opposed to martial ones. However, this balance was disrupted by Brissac, who took advantage of the holy week to lodge his troops in the faubourg de Bressigné and attend a service cathedral of Saint-Maurice. On 30 March La Rochepot, who was staying at the Ponts-de-Cé which commanded the crossing of the Loire issued an ultimatum. He demanded for his safety that the city be cleared. If this was not undertaken, La Rochepot would introduce 1500 soldiers into Angers. The grandees of Angers countered that they would like both La Rochepot and Brissac to depart. Brissac therefore withdrew, but by this time Marshal d'Aumont was approaching with the royal Picard regiment. This caused great distress in Angers, which felt pincered between D'Aumont and La Rochepot on one side and Puycharic on the other. Brissac saw advantage, and returned to the streets of Angers, encouraging the building of barricades to obstruct the royal force installing ligueur guards at the gates and ramparts. However the city notables were not keen to be subject to a violent attack, and entered negotiations with d'Aumont and La Rochepot. Brissac would be removed from the city, and in return Angers would not be subject to a sack. On 1 April the Picard regiment entered the city.

With his city re-secured, a wave of repression followed, 49 participants being arrested, various martial law measures were undertaken to guarantee the security of the city, including replacement of unreliable militia officers, a curfew, house searches, and a prohibition on night-time assemblies. D'Aumont undertook a tax on the households of Angers to support the upkeep of his Picard company. New municipal elections were undertaken, which delivered royalist candidates, arousing the indignation of a local ligueur who denounced them as Protestants. A new bishop was installed, Charles Miron, who added to the mass a prayer for Henri.

On 20 June a general amnesty was established, coupled with the demand that oaths of obedience to Henri be undertaken.

=== War against the ligue ===
Several days previous, on 14 June 1589, La Rochepot began an attempted assault of the ligueur held city of Le Mans. He made an assault on the faubourgs (suburbs). Inside the city the ligue got violent, with suspected traitors being executed. On 24 June a man named Saint-Denis was hanged on suspicion of having sold out the faubourg de la Couture to the royalist army.

== Reign of Henri IV ==
=== Fighting the ligue ===
In the wake of the assassination of Henri III, and succession of the Protestant king of Navarre as Henri IV for the royalists, La Rochepot was aware this was a sensitive time for Angers. He therefore swore to remain a Catholic alongside all the grandees of Angers. La Rochepot was not convinced this would be sufficient to maintain the town's loyalty to the crown, and therefore introduced further troops into the city. A priest who urged his flock to disobey Henri IV was arrested, and further arrests undertaken. On 1 September, La Rochepot and Puycharic decided to strike a psychological blow against the ligueurs of the city by celebrating a high mass for Henri III's memory. The cathedral was decorated in mourning black for the occasion, with the arms of France and the Polish-Lithuanian Commonwealth above the altar. The service was conducted by the bishop of Le Mans.

While Angers was secured, other parts of Anjou were more resistant. La Rochepot tried and failed to reduce Le Lion-d'Angers and Craon. He found success at La Flèche but was subject to a ligueur counter-attack in October. He would however take a fortified house near Morannes. This small scale back and forth continued until December, when Henri arrived, capturing Le Mans, and all the small towns of Maine and Anjou. This included Sablé, Château-Gontier, Laval, Segré, Morannes, and Cheffes.

=== Capture of Paris ===
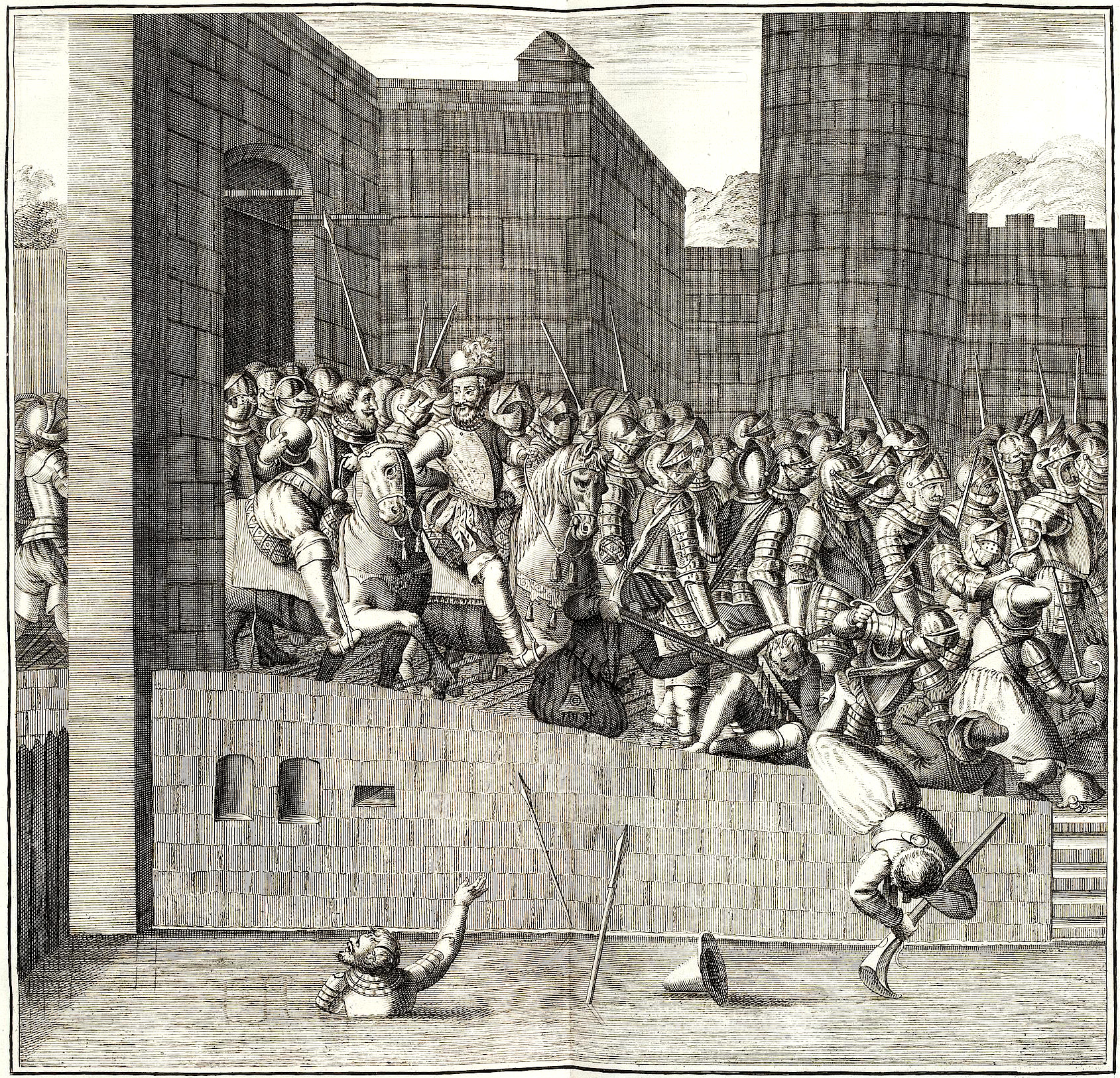
Henri IV enters Paris after its betrayal

In 1594, Henri made plans to see to the reduction of Paris to royalist obedience. He was assisted in this by his ligueur adversary Mayenne, who replaced the governor of the city with the comte de Brissac on the understanding he would be more reliably ligueur. No sooner was Brissac installed as governor on 24 January than he opened lines of communication with the royalists, Schomberg, De Thou, the chancellor Bellièvre and his brother in law Rochepot. With his talks proving fruitful, he betrayed the city to the royalists on 22 March.

The following year La Rochepot was inducted as a chevalier (knight) of the royal chivalric orders. By this it is meant the Ordre de Saint-Michel (Order of Saint-Michel) and the Ordre du Saint-Esprit (Order of Saint-Esprit).

=== Ambassador to España ===
Peace between France and España was signed on 2 May 1598. Henri took an oath in support of the peace on 21 June of that year. King Felipe for his part would not take an oath to indicate his support of the peace until 27 May 1601. Therefore, while the two monarchies were theoretically at peace during this period, a low level cold war continued. La Rochepot was dispatched as the first ambassador of the peace to España. From his arrival he was confronted with a hostile Spanish population, a matter only exacerbated by his arrogant attitude. On 18 July 1601 the Spanish authorities stormed La Rochepot's ambassadorial residence in Valladolid with several hundred men and undertook a series of arrests of men in his retinue. Henri meanwhile was supporting Dutch rebels in their war against the Spanish crown. After the incident in La Rochepot's residence he was recalled to France, and no new ambassador would be sent to España until 1603. During his time as ambassador to España, the governor of the château d'Angers filled his responsibilities in Anjou.

He remained the governor of Anjou until his death in 1609, he was succeeded in this charge by Boisdauphin.

== Sources ==
- Babelon, Jean-Pierre (2009). Henri IV. Fayard.
- Carroll, Stuart (2005). Noble Power during the French Wars of Religion: The Guise Affinity and Catholic Cause in Normandy. Cambridge University Press.
- Carroll, Stuart (2011). Martyrs and Murderers: The Guise Family and the Making of Europe. Oxford University Press.
- Chevallier, Pierre (1985). Henri III: Roi Shakespearien. Fayard.
- Cloulas, Ivan (1979). Catherine de Médicis. Fayard.
- Constant, Jean-Marie (1984). Les Guise. Hachette.
- Constant, Jean-Marie (1996). La Ligue. Fayard.
- Holt, Mack (2002). The Duke of Anjou and the Politique Struggle During the Wars of Religion. Cambridge University Press.
- Knecht, Robert (2016). Hero or Tyrant? Henry III, King of France, 1574-1589. Routledge.
- Pitts, Vincent (2012). Henri IV of France: His Reign and Age. Johns Hopkins University Press.
- Roberts, Penny (1996). A City in Conflict: Troyes during the French Wars of Religion. Manchester University Press.
- Le Roux, Nicolas (2000). La Faveur du Roi: Mignons et Courtisans au Temps des Derniers Valois. Champ Vallon.
- Le Roux, Nicolas (2020). Portraits d'un Royaume: Henri III, la Noblesse et la Ligue. Passés Composés.
- Le Roux, Nicolas (2022). 1559-1629 Les Guerres de Religion. Gallimard.
- Sainte-Marie, Anselme (1733). Histoire généalogique et chronologique de la maison royale de France, des pairs, grands officiers de la Couronne, de la Maison du Roy et des anciens barons du royaume.... Tome 9. la compagnie des libraires.
- Salmon, J.H.M (1979). Society in Crisis: France during the Sixteenth Century. Metheun & Co.
- Sciences, Académie des (1916). Mémoires de la Société d'agriculture, sciences et arts d'Angers (Ed. de l'Ouest ed.). Académie des sciences, belles-lettres et arts.
