= Henri de Silly =

French noble and courtier (1551-1586)

- comte de La Roche-Guyon
- Coat of Arms
- Born: 5 September 1551
- Died: 1586 (aged 34–35)
- Noble family: Maison de Silly
- Spouse: Antoinette de Pons
- Issue: François de Silly, duc de La Roche-Guyon
- Father: Louis de Silly, seigneur de La Roche-Guyon
- Mother: Anne de Laval

Henri de Silly, seigneur de La Roche-Guyon, damoiseau de Commercy, baron d'Aquigny (5 September 1551 – 1586) was a French noble, military commander, and courtier during the French Wars of Religion. The eldest son of Louis de Silly, seigneur de La Roche-Guyon and Anne de Laval, he initially entered the service of the duc d'Anjou (duke of Anjou) brother to the king. After the death of king Charles IX, Anjou returned to France as Henri III. La Roche-Guyon served in the new king's household as either an écuyer or échanson (squire or cupbearer) before becoming a gentilhomme de la chambre (gentleman of the king's chamber). La Roche-Guyon was infuriated when Jeanne de Cossé, who had been due to marry him, was instead married to the king's favourite Saint-Luc and departed court. Affiliating himself with the king's brother the duc d'Alençon he raised troops in Normandie for indeterminate purpose. He further involved himself in plots to both kidnap and poison Henri III.

In response Henri declared him an outlaw and issued a warrant for his arrest. La Roche-Guyon fled to the lands of the duc de Lorraine where he engaged in further conspiracy with the mercenary commander Pfalz-Simmern, discussing a trade of his lands in Lorraine for a mercenary army with which to invade France, this would not come to pass. In early 1585, he allied himself with the rebellious Catholic Ligue (League) and fought against the crown under the command of the duc d'Elbeuf in Normandie. After the peace in July, he was inducted as a chevalier (knight) into the royal order of Saint-Esprit in December. He died in 1586 and was succeeded to his titles by his son François de Silly, duc de La Roche-Guyon.

== Early life and family ==
Henri de Silly was born on 5 September 1551 the son of Louis de Silly, seigneur de La Roche-Guyon, baron de Louvois and his wife Anne de Laval dame d'Aquigny and La Rochepot, who was the daughter of Guy XVI de Laval and Anne de Montmorency. His parents were married in 1539.

The Silly family were part of the French noblesse seconde (secondary nobility). His younger brother was the comte de La Rochepot.

Henri de Silly was a Protestant.

Henri de Silly married Antoinette de Pons, the marquise de Guercheville. She was a welcome presence at the court of Henri III during her husbands lifetime before retiring to her Norman lands on his death. In 1586 she married the seigneur de Liancourt, prémier écuyer of Henri III. Henri IV fell in love with her in 1589.

They had the following issue:

- François de Silly, duc de La Roche-Guyon (1621) married Catherine Gillone de Goyon de Matignon without issue.

== Reign of Charles IX ==
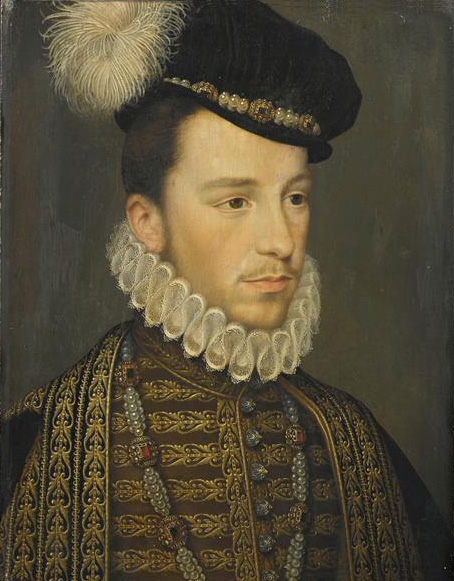
Duc d'Anjou and subsequently king of France as Henri III

In 1573, La Roche-Guyon travelled with the duc d'Anjou as part of his household as he left France to establish himself in his new kingdom of the Polish-Lithuanian Commonwealth. The trip was his first official dignity and he was not particularly integrated into Anjou's network at this time. He was young like much of Anjou's household, with most members of the household being between 18 and 24. While in the Commonwealth, he served as a gentilhomme de la chambre for Anjou. Unlike many of Anjou's companions during his brief reign in the Commonwealth, La Roche-Guyon stayed with him until his flight from the kingdom to assume the throne of France.

== Reign of Henri III ==
Upon Anjou's return to France as Henri III, the duc de Nevers who had been a long time companion of the prince felt as if he had been cut out of access to royal patronage in favour of new men. When considering those he could still rely on to support him at court he named Schomberg, Malicorne, and La Roche-Guyon among others. All these men were on the periphery of the king's circle of intimates.

=== Alienation ===
Around 1575 La Roche-Guyon was serving as a écuyer or échanson (squire or cupbearer) to the king. Over the coming years he exchanged this office for the more prestigious office of gentilhomme de la chambre du roi (gentleman of the king's chamber).

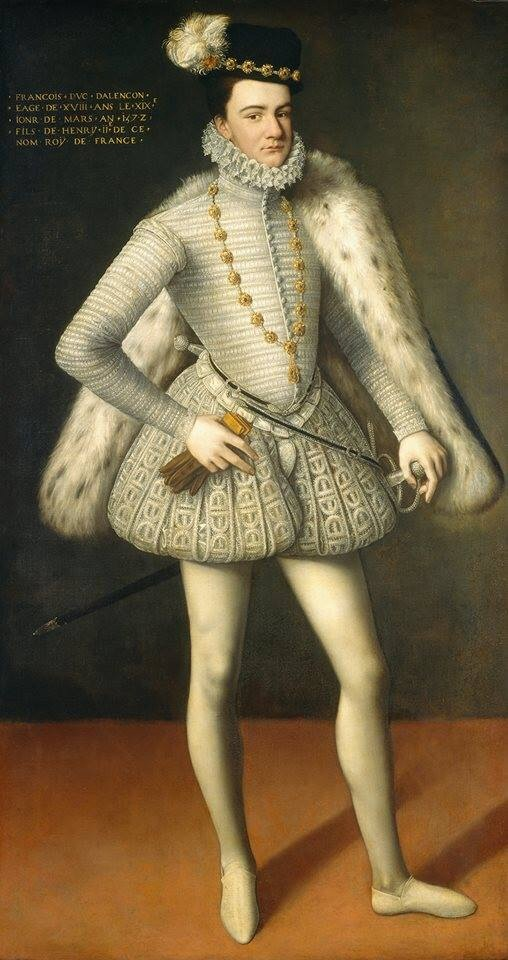
Duc d'Alençon and brother to Henri III

La Roche-Guyon was alienated from the king over the marriage of Saint-Luc and Jeanne de Cossé, daughter of Marshal Cossé in February 1578. She had been promised for marriage to La Roche-Guyon and therefore furious he turned against the crown. La Roche-Guyon was indignant that she had been given to a man of lower social status with the attention of aggrandising the standing of a royal favourite. La Roche-Guyon then insulted the king, Jeanne and Saint-Luc, and departed from court. He would not return until 1585.

=== Rebellion ===
During December 1578 La Roche-Guyon was raising troops near Rouen. He had them swear oaths of loyalty to Alençon, and prepared for a campaign into Nederland (though the oath made some fear they were intended to be the basis of a new ligue). These forces were ill disciplined and caused grief among the peasantry. Alençon arrived in Normandie in January 1579, his 1578 expedition to Nederland a failure.

In March 1579 Henri made concessions to the Norman Estates, offering a small reduction in the taille and a confirmation of their charter, however this failed to sooth things.

In August Alençon departed for England, but he left his Norman clients behind.

Through 1579, Catherine was working in southern France to try to bring the situation with the baron de Bellegarde under control. Upon her return northwards she found disorders had broken out in the north. In lower Normandie the peasantry had entered rebellion, Rouen had rioted and several lords (La Roche-Guyon, Chantelou and Pont-Bellenger) were rumoured to be planning to kidnap the king while he was staying at Saint-Germain. It was alleged that all these disorders were the work of the agents of the duc d'Alençon who wished to distract Spanish attention from his plans to restart campaigning into Nederland.

=== Intrigues in Lorraine ===
Henri issued an arrest warrant for La Roche-Guyon, Chantelou and Pont-Bellenger on the grounds of how they had acted during the provincial Estates, and raising of soldiers. La Roche-Guyon was further accused by the king of having attempted to seize Rouen and have him poisoned. Chantelou and La Roche-Guyon were abandoned by Alençon to their fate, and fled to La Roche-Guyon's estates in Lorraine.

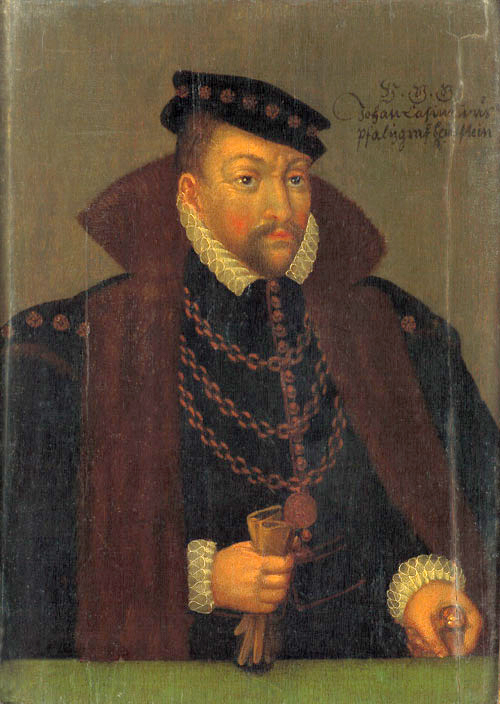
Pfalz-Simmern, mercenary leader who participated in the fifth French War of Religion and received a large indemnity from the French crown

It was decided that it would be necessary to disperse the lords who were gathering under La Roche-Guyon in Champagne. At this time the prince de Condé had also seized La Fère and Catherine departed to Picardie to try to talk him down from provoking a new Catholic backlash by his provocative acts.

La Roche-Guyon travelled to Nancy where the duc de Lorraine was hosting festivals and banquets. Henri desired to pursue the rebellious malcontent, but was dissuaded by Catherine from pursuing this course. Also present in Nancy was the Protestant mercenary leader Pfalz-Simmern who was owed significant sums of money by France for his involvement in the Fifth French War of Religion in 1575, which the crown struggled to pay, and therefore he continually menaced the kingdom with invasion. He entered into discussions first with the duc de Mayenne to discuss a project to seize Strasbourg. La Roche-Guyon and his party of 'malcontents' were also a potential sponsor for Pfalz-Simmern's future plans, and the latter undertook interviews with the baron de Rosne, a confident of Alençons and Bassompierre to discuss potential projects. In discussions between La Roche-Guyon and Pfalz-Simmern, La Roche-Guyon proposed that he provide his lands of Commercy (worth around 200,000 écus (crowns)) to the German captain, in return for which Pfalz-Simmern would raise an army for him of men on foot and on horse. Much like the baron de Rosne, La Roche-Guyon was both a servant of Alençon and Guise, prepared to serve both in any operations.

It was agreed eventually that in return for receipt of several cities, Pfalz-Simmern would invade France with 5000 reiters, while La Roche-Guyon would raise gentleman in Normandie in support of the project. The secrecy in which the negotiations were conducted have left historians confused as to the specifics of the arrangements. In the event, a month passed without any action, with the attempt on Strasbourg failing.

=== War with the crown ===
With the Catholic ligue (League) entering a state of war with the crown in 1585, La Roche-Guyon and the seigneur de Chantelou rallied to the cause, lacking an alternative royal patron. They joined the army of the duc d'Elbeuf which was assembling in the province of Normandie. On 5 April Elbeuf's army left Caen and marched on Bayeux, where he set himself up until 9 April. In May the ligueur (leaguer) army marched to join the ligueur comte de Brissac at Angers, but was intercepted by the royal favourite Anne de Joyeuse at Beaugency in a skirmish which the royalists came out the better of. Despite this, Henri capitulated to the ligue on 7 July, agreeing to outlaw Protestantism and granted the members of the Lorraine family who led the organisation various surety towns.

On 31 December 1585 La Roche-Guyon was inducted into the royal chivalric orders. This meant that he became a chevalier (knight) of the Ordre de Saint-Michel (Order of Saint-Michel) and the Ordre du Saint-Esprit (Order of Saint-Esprit).

La Roche-Guyon died in 1586.

== Sources ==
- Babelon, Jean-Pierre (2009). Henri IV. Fayard.
- Carroll, Stuart (2005). Noble Power during the French Wars of Religion: The Guise Affinity and Catholic Cause in Normandy. Cambridge University Press.
- Cloulas, Ivan (1979). Catherine de Médicis. Fayard.
- Constant, Jean-Marie (1984). Les Guise. Hachette.
- Constant, Jean-Marie (1996). La Ligue. Fayard.
- Knecht, Robert (2016). Hero or Tyrant? Henry III, King of France, 1574-1589. Routledge.
- Le Roux, Nicolas (2000). La Faveur du Roi: Mignons et Courtisans au Temps des Derniers Valois. Champ Vallon.
- Sainte-Marie, Anselme (1733). Histoire généalogique et chronologique de la maison royale de France, des pairs, grands officiers de la Couronne, de la Maison du Roy et des anciens barons du royaume.... Tome 9. la compagnie des libraires.
