= Charles de Cossé, Count of Brissac =

French courtier and soldier

Charles de Cossé
- Count of Brissac
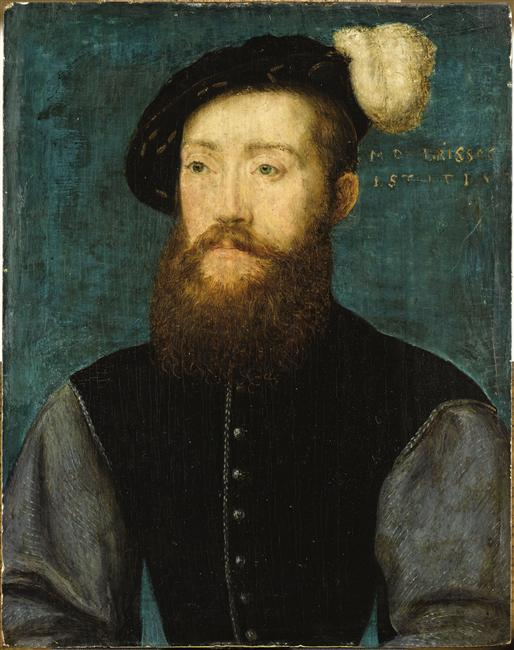
- Portrait by the school of Corneille de Lyon.
- Full name: Charles de Cossé
- Born: 1505
- Died: 31 December 1563 (aged 58)
- Noble family: House of Cossé
- Spouse: Charlotte Le Sueur
- Issue: Timoléon, Count of Brissac; Charles, Duke of Brissac; Jeanne de Cossé
- Father: René de Cossé, Lord of Brissac
- Mother: Charlotte Gouffier

Charles de Cossé, Count of Brissac (1505 (O.S.)/06 – 1563), was a French courtier and soldier, named beau Brissac at court and remembered as the Maréchal Brissac. A member of the nobility of Anjou, he was appointed in 1540 to his father's prestigious former post of Grand Falconer of France, one of the Great Officers of the Maison du Roi. This was not purely honorary, as the king still hunted with falcons. Brissac was also Grand Panetier, and his position as colonel general of the cavalry (1548–49) was a court appointment. Raised to Marshal of France in 1550, he was Grand Master of the Artillery. He was eventually given the title of Count of Brissac. His son, Charles II de Cossé, became the first Duke of Brissac.

== Early life and family ==
The son of René de Cossé, seigneur of Brissac and of Cossé in Anjou, grand fauconnier du Roi, and of his wife Charlotte Gouffier de Boisy, he was an enfant d'honneur in the household of the dauphin François, son of King François I. The young prince made him his premier écuyer.

He married Charlotte Le Sueur d'Esquetot and had four children. His younger son was Charles II de Cossé, Duke of Brissac, who was the first Duke of Brissac. This son headed forces loyal to the Catholic League during the French Wars of Religion.

== Reign of François I ==
Not robust by nature, he made himself an agile swordsman and horseman. Sent to the siege of Naples in 1528, he made a name for himself when his forces were being attacked by the Spanish. Upon embarking from the galleys, he was forced back to the shore's edge. There, helmetless and without his cuirass, afoot, sword in hand, he made prisoner the armed knight on horseback who attacked him. Later, he commanded a hundred light cavalry at the taking of Avigliana and at the castle of Susa in 1537.

Grand fauconnier de France since 1540, he was named in 1542 as colonel général des gens de guerre français, à pied, de là les monts. At the siege of Perpignan, fighting under the new Dauphin (later King Henri II), he covered himself with glory when the besieged forces surprised the unwary young nobles engaged in gaming in the Dauphin's tent, defended the pieces of artillery until the infantry regrouped and relieved him.

As colonel general, he was in command of all the light cavalry in Piedmont in 1543 and that same year followed the king to Flanders, where he took 600 prisoners. In the following retreat of Habsburg forces and their allies, he took prisoner Francesco d'Este, brother of the Duke of Ferrara. In the return to France, he took the exposed position of rear guard at great personal danger.

In 1544, with his light cavalry, he was sent to harass Imperial forces at Vitry-en-Perthois, was twice taken prisoner and twice rescued by his troops. The following year, he fought at Oye in the Boulonnais. Following the peace that was agreed in 1546, he was made Grand Master of Artillery.

== Reign of Henri II ==
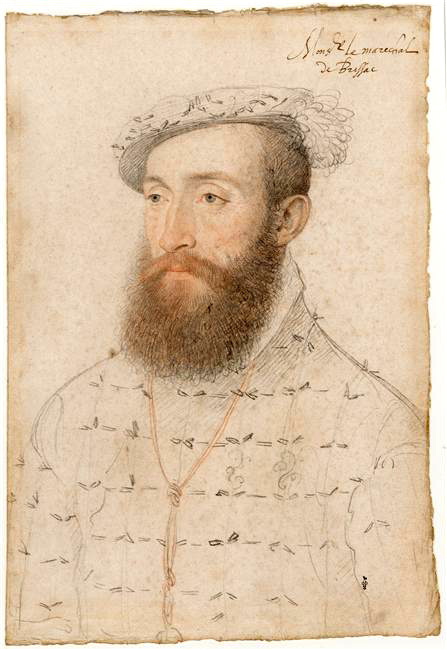
Pencil portrait, heightened with colour, c. 1550 (Musée Condé, Chantilly)

In the Italian War of 1551–1559 and the War of Parma, as Maréchal de France (1550), Brissac was sent as governor to French-occupied Piedmont, where he distinguished himself by the strict discipline kept in the occupying army, maintained in fighting trim by regular military exercises and forbidden to harass peasants, merchants or bourgeois, which was considered remarkable at the time.

In 1551, Brissac established himself at Chieri and several other Piedmontese cities, obliging Gonzaga to raise the siege of Parma. In 1553, he took Vercelli and pillaged the treasury of Charles III, Duke of Savoy, which had been transported there as an impregnable place of safety. Though he was unable to take the citadel for lack of cannon, the energetic presence of Brissac in Piedmont forced the Duke to reinforced his garrisons, weakening his forces in the field, as Brissac hoped. Perennially short of cash from the king of France, Brissac held his troops together through the force of their loyalty to him. In 1554, he occupied the hilly district of Langhe and finished his campaign with the conquest of Ivrea, which opened a route for the auxiliary Swiss forces. In 1555, by a daring move, he surprised and took Casale, where the nobles of the Imperial forces, gathered for a festive tourney, had barely time to fortify themselves in the citadel. Brissac, forbidding his troops to pillage the city, secured the capitulation of the fortress and all its armaments, and paid his soldiers through the ransom of their captives. Henri II made a present of his own sword to Brissac.

These and other episodes of his military role were recounted by François de Boivin. His portrait, attributed to Corneille de Lyon, is conserved in the Metropolitan Museum of Art.

== Children ==
1. Timoléon de Cossé, Count of Brissac (1543 - 28 April 1569)
2. Charles de Cossé, 1st Duke of Brissac (1550–1621), Marshal of France, known as the "Maréchal de Cossé".
3. Jeanne de Cossé (? - 1602) married the seigneur de Saint-Luc.
