= François de Boivin =

French chronicler

François de Boivin (or Boyvin), Baron du Villars (died 1618) was a French chronicler.

He entered the service of Marshal Charles de Brissac, as secretary, and accompanied him to Piedmont in 1550 when the marshal went to take command of the French troops in the war with Spain. Remaining in this service he was sent after the defeat of the French at St Quentin in 1557 to assure the French king Henry II of the support of Brissac.

He took part in the negotiations which led to the treaty of Cateau-Cambrésis in April 1559, but was unable to prevent Henry II from ceding the conquests made by Brissac.

Boivin wrote his Mémoires sur les guerres démêlées tant en Piedmont, qu'au Montferrat & Duché de Milan par feu Messire Charles de Cossé, conte de Brissac […] (1606), (followed by an extended edition in 1610) which, in spite of some drawbacks, is valuable as the testimony of an eye-witness of the war. An edition, carefully revised, appears in the Mémoires relatifs de l'histoire de France, tome x., edited by JF Michaud and JJF Poujoulat (1850). He also wrote Instruction sur les affaires d'état (1610).
