= Timoléon d'Espinay =

French soldier

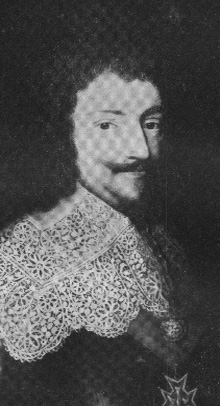

Timoléon d'Espinay (1580–1644), French soldier, was the eldest of the four sons of François d'Espinay, seigneur de Saint Luc (1554–1597), and was himself marquis de Saint Luc. In 1603 he accompanied Sully in his embassy to London.

In 1622, in his capacity as vice-admiral of France, he gained some advantages over the defenders of La Rochelle, obliging the Huguenot commander, Benjamin de Rohan, seigneur de Soubise, to evacuate the islands of Ré and Oléron. In 1627 he was named lieutenant-general of Guienne and Marshal of France.
