= Philibert de La Guiche =

16th-century French governor and military officer

- seigneur de Chaumont
- La Guiche's coat of arms
- Born: c. 1544
- Died: c. 1607
- Noble family: Maison de La Guiche
- Father: Gabriel de La Guiche

Philibert de La Guiche, seigneur de Chaumont (c. 1544 -c. 1607) was a French noble, courtier, governor and military officer during the French Wars of Religion. The son of a prominent noble in Mâcon, La Guiche inherited his father's position in the city in 1555. He served under the command of the duke of Montmorency during the early wars of religion, during which he was awarded the highest chivalric honour, that of l'Ordre de Saint-Michel. Keeping his governorships out of involvement in the St Bartholomew's Day Massacre, he was with the brother of the king the duke of Anjou for the prosecution of the siege of La Rochelle. He made an impression upon the prince and was appointed to a position in his household, and was granted the governorship of the Bourbonnais. Upon Anjou's election as king of the Commonwealth he travelled to the country with the now king, serving in his household. Anjou soon returned to France to assume the kingship, styling himself Henri III. The new king was confronted with a civil war, which La Guiche served in, first as commander of an ordinance company, and then as maître de camp for the light horse, an appointment designed to erode the influence over the cavalry of the duke of Guise.

During the sixth civil war that followed the short peace, he was captured by Protestant forces near Brouage and held until the end of the war. In 1578 he resigned his office of maître de camp to Saint-Mégrin and was compensated with the more senior office of Grand Maître de l'Artillerie, a post he would hold until 1596. He accompanied the king's brother Alençon on his campaign into Nederland in 1581. Through the 1580s he bonded himself closely to one of the king's paramount favourites the duke of Épernon, and became among his closest companions, assisting him in his return to court in 1586. La Guiche remained loyal to the king after the December 1588 assassination of the duke of Guise and was therefore entrusted in Henri's carefully chosen royal council in 1589. After the Assassination of Henri III in turn, he supported the royalist cause, for which he was rewarded with the governorship of the Lyonnais in September 1595, at first intended on a temporary basis. He died in 1607, still in possession of this office.

== Early life and family ==
Philibert de La Guiche was born in 1544 the son of Gabriel de La Guiche. Philibert had a brother, Claude de La Guiche, seigneur de Saint-Géran, and a sister Péronne de La Guiche, who married Louis de Pompadour. Gabriel was one of six men close to the king that had been made chevalier de l'Ordre de Saint-Michel at the advent of the reign of Henri II. Alongside this honour, he was bailli and captain of Mâcon, and governor of Bresse and Bugey.

The La Guiche family had deep roots in Bourgogne, going back to their service for the dukes of Bourgogne. During the fifteenth century they established themselves as the royal authorities in Mâcon, and Philibert's grandfather, Pierre de La Guiche was the first of their family to enter royal service, as Chambellan to Louis XII. Members of the family fought under the command of the duke of Montmorency during the Italian Wars.

Setting himself up in Paris after entering royal favour, he first resided in a hôtel on the rue des Petits-Champs, before establishing himself on the rue des Poulies after being granted the office of Grand Maître de l'artillerie.

== Reign of Henri II ==
La Guiche inherited his father's responsibilities as bailli and governor of the important Bourguignon city of Mâcon in 1555.

== Reign of Charles IX ==
=== Early service ===
During the large expansion of the Ordre de Saint-Michel that took place in 1568, La Guiche was among those to receive this most senior honour of the crown. His collar of the order was bestowed on him by the brother of Charles IX, the duke of Anjou.

La Guiche fought for the crown during the second and third wars of religion in the 1560s. As a member of the Montmorency affinity he served under the command of Damville, second son of the duke, in his ordinance company. After initially holding the role of guidon of the company, in April 1568 he received promotion to lieutenant of the company. Around this time he and his brother Saint-Géran received a gift from the crown of 4000 livres.

=== Siege of La Rochelle ===
Of a moderate disposition, when the Massacre of Saint Bartholomew spread into the provinces in the weeks that followed the initial slaughter, La Guiche helped prevent any killings from happening at Mâcon.

After the Massacre of Saint Bartholomew, the city of La Rochelle entered rebellion against the crown. This was an unacceptable situation, and the crown dispatched Anjou to reduce the city into obedience. The siege presented an opportunity for many young nobles, among them La Guiche, to get close to their social superiors. As a result of the proximity that developed between them, Anjou elevated La Guiche to the position of Chambellan in his ducal household. He further arranged with the crown for La Guiche to receive appointment as captain of cinquante gentilhomme d'armes in June. In April of this year, he was granted a provincial governate, that of the Bourbonnais, part of the royal appanage. He would only hold this government while Anjou remained in France.

=== Commonwealth ===
When, during the conduct of the siege, Anjou was elected as king of the Commonwealth, he took the opportunity to wind down the siege so he could depart. La Guiche accompanied the prince to his new kingdom, continuing to hold a role in his household of Chambellan. Unlike many others who travelled with Anjou east, he stayed with the king until news arrived of the death of Charles IX.

== Reign of Henri III ==
=== Fifth civil war ===
When Anjou returned to France as Henri III, he was confronted with civil war. La Guiche served the royalist cause through his command of an ordinance company during 1575. Henri was looking to counter the influence of the duke of Guise over the army. Guise was colonel-general of the light cavalry at the time. To dilute his influence over the important command, La Guiche was established by the king as maître de camp for the light cavalry, succeeding Jean de La Valette in the role. La Guiche was also established as a gentilhomme de la chambre du roi in that year.

=== Sixth civil war ===
During the sixth civil war, he fought around the Protestant held town of Brouage on the Atlantic seaboard, alongside Caylus, another favourite of the king. The two men were captured by the Protestants in July at Saugeon, much to the king's frustration. The capture was planned by the Protestant governor of Royan, Campeste. Caylus and La Guiche appeal to another favourite of the king Beauvais-Nangis to negotiate their release. They would however only be released with the signing of peace three months later.

On 6 July 1578, La Guiche traded his responsibilities as Maître de camp for the light horse to Saint-Mégrin. In return for yielding this charge to another favourite of the kings, La Guiche was granted the role of Grand Maître de l'artillerie. A member of the conseil d'État, La Guiche's presence was infrequent.

=== King of Nederland ===
As a result of his proximity to the king's brother Alençon he was among the many nobles who assembled at Château-Thierry in May 1581 to accompany Alençon on his campaign into Nederland. Alongside him were the duke of Elbeuf of the powerful Lorraine family, Saint-Luc the disgraced royal favourite and the Protestant Turenne. Catherine de Medici fruitlessly tried to appeal to her son to reconsider his expedition, however he rebuffed her attempts. The army moved to Cambrai where it relieved the city from the Spanish siege it was subject to.

=== Épernon ===
During the 1580s, Épernon moved into ascendency at court as one of the kings two chief favourites. As such he was in a position to make many requests of the king for his clients. Sensitive to the position of the leading military men, La Guiche and Joachim de Châteauvieux he made sure that the requests he made did not impinge upon their positions. Épernon was very close to La Guiche, considering him one of the few men in which he could confide. In February 1586 when planning his return to court, it was to La Guiche he wrote to ensure that the road would be safely filled with his allies. This meant that when Épernon conducted campaigns against the Protestants in 1586, in Dauphiné and Provence, La Guiche was a participant in the campaign.

At council in October 1587, Épernon, favourite of the king, denounced one of Henri's chief ministers Villeroy. He accused Villeroy of corruption as concerned state funds. La Guiche who was present intervened, trying to calm Épernon, who was threatening to assault Villeroy. A confrontation was averted.

After the assassination of the duke of Guise in December 1588, Henri, increasingly insecure about who he could trust, reformed his council again. La Guiche was among those men who maintained their position in his new council for 1589. Alongside him were Marshal Retz, Claude d'Angennes, Maintenon, Rambouillet and François d'O.

== Reign of Henri IV ==
Having transferred his loyalty to Henri IV on the assassination of Henri III, he formed part of his royal council alongside the princes du sang, the royal officers, Biron and D'O.

He was rewarded on 21 September 1595 with the office of governor of the Lyonnais, which he was intended to hold until the duke of Vendôme, illegitimate son of the king, reached adulthood. However Vendôme would instead be granted the governate of Bretagne, meaning that La Guiche would hold the office of governor of Lyonnais until his death.

On 5 September 1596, he resigned his office of Grand Maître de l'artillerie in favour of Saint-Luc. He died in 1607.

== Sources ==
- Babelon, Jean-Pierre (2009). Henri IV. Fayard.
- Carroll, Stuart (2005). Noble Power during the French Wars of Religion: The Guise Affinity and the Catholic Cause in Normandy. Cambridge University Press.
- Cloulas, Ivan (1979). Catherine de Médicis. Fayard.
- Cloulas, Ivan (1985). Henri II. Fayard.
- Constant, Jean-Marie (1984). Les Guise. Hachette.
- Harding, Robert (1978). Anatomy of a Power Elite: the Provincial Governors in Early Modern France. Yale University Press.
- Knecht, Robert (2016). Hero or Tyrant? Henry III, King of France, 1574-1589. Routledge.
- Péricaud, Antoine (1887). Les gouverneurs de Lyon. Mougin-Rusand.
- Le Roux, Nicolas (2000). La Faveur du Roi: Mignons et Courtisans au Temps des Derniers Valois. Champ Vallon.
- Le Roux, Nicolas (2006). Un Régicide au nom de Dieu: L'Assassinat d'Henri III. Gallimard.
- Sutherland, Nicola (1962). The French Secretaries of State in the Age of Catherine de Medici. The Athlone Press.
