= Charles de Cossé, 1st Duke of Brissac =

Marshal of France

Charles de Cossé
- 1st Duke of Brissac
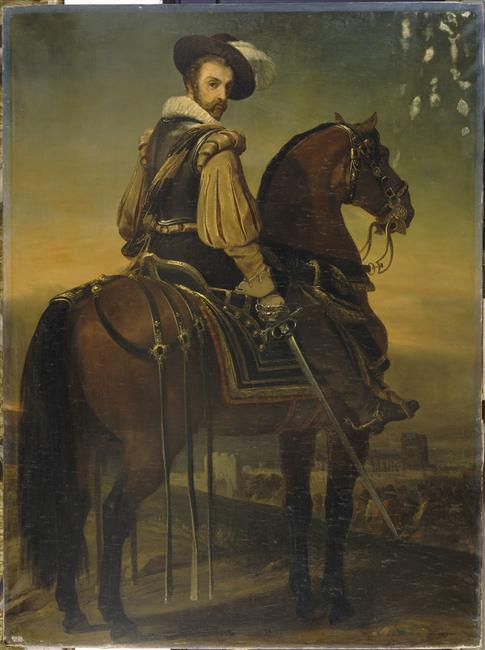
- Equestrian portrait of the duke
- Born: c. 1550
- Died: c. 1621
- Noble family: House of Cossé
- Father: Charles de Cossé, Count of Brissac
- Mother: Charlotte d'Esquetot

Charles de Cossé, 1st Duke of Brissac (c. 1550 –c. 1621) was a French noble, military commander, governor, courtier and rebel during the latter French Wars of Religion. Son of Charles I de Cossé and Charlotte d'Esquetot, Brissac was born into a family with a strong military reputation, both his father and uncle being French Marshals. As a second son Brissac was not initially intended to assume the titles of his father, but his brother Timoléon de Cossé was killed during a siege in 1569. Brissac was intimately involved in the French response to the Portuguese succession crisis of 1580, being selected by Catherine de' Medici the queen mother as one of the two military commanders for the expedition. In June 1582 he departed with a fleet under the overall authority of Strozzi, another Marshals' son. They were met with disaster at the Battle of Vila Franca do Campo, Strozzi was killed and Brissac took responsibility for extracting the ships that could be saved from the superior enemy. Catherine desired for him to lead another expedition but Henry overruled her, and Brissac looked to the duke of Guise for purpose, becoming involved in the abortive plans for an invasion of England. After these too fell through, Brissac involved himself in the revived Catholic ligue which rose in response to the death of the king's brother in June 1584 and the subsequent threat of a Protestant king. As a result of the dauphins death, Brissac received command of the Château d'Angers. The ligue resolved to make war on the king to get him to revise his policy, and Brissac campaigned in Normandy but was bested by Épernon at the siege of Gien. The war was brought to a close with a favourable settlement to the ligue in September.

The king was compelled by the terms of the peace to make war on Protestantism, and in the subsequent campaign, the Protestant Condé seized Angers from Brissac. The governor of Anjou, Bouchage aided in the restoring of royal authority over the city, but Henry did not want to return the Château to Brissac, and Brissac was pushed into selling his control of it to the king's favourite Joyeuse. In May 1588 tensions between the ligue and their nominal ally Henry overflowed and Paris rioted against the king's attempt to introduce troops to the capital. In the combats that followed, Brissac drove the royal Swiss guard back across the city, and was prepared to storm the king's residence on 13 May before Henry slipped from the city. Humiliated Henry sought to regain his position at the Estates General of 1588. Brissac was elected as président of the Second Estate and after the king arranged the assassination of the duke of Guise he was briefly arrested. Not viewed as a threat, he was released after a couple of weeks and after some time on his estates he joined the ligueur war against their 'tyrannical' king. He headed first to Angers, where he was bested by Marshal Aumont and then Normandy where he lost a battle to the duke of Montpensier. In 1592, he was established as governor of Poitiers, where he exercised his governorship like he was sovereign. In December 1593 he was appointed governor of Paris, viewed as a reliably ligueur figure, unlike his predecessor. He opened negotiations to betray the city to the royalist candidate for king, Henry IV. For his treachery he was rewarded with the office of Marshal and a large bribe. He was tasked by his new king with campaigning against the last ligueur holdout Mercœur. In 1620 his seigneurie was raised to a duché-pairie by Louis XIII. He died the following year.

== Early life and family ==
Charles II de Cossé was born around 1550, the son of Charles I de Cossé and Charlotte d'Esquetot. His father had a celebrated military career during the latter Italian Wars that saw him made a Marshal of France. His paternal uncle Artus de Cossé would also be elevated to the Marshalate in 1567.

Brissac married the daughter of Rocher Portail, who had at one time been a tanner. This marriage while considerably below his aristocratic station, had the advantage of providing him much needed money.

Souvré, a favourite of Henry's was asked by the king in 1577, to hurry along marriage negotiations that were underway between Brissac and Saint-Luc who desired to marry Brissac's sister Jeanne de Cossé. The marriage was undertaken sometime in the following couple of years.

His brother, the count of Brissac was killed in May 1569 during the siege of Mussidan at the age of only 26. As a result, Brissac inherited his eponymous county, he further inherited the position of grand panetier de la roi that his uncle had ceded to his brother in 1567.

== Reign of Henry III ==
Brissac had aligned himself with the king's brother Alençon, heir to the throne, by 1581.

=== Portugal succession crisis ===
In 1580, the Portuguese throne became vacant, and the king's mother Catherine de' Medici had a claim to the succession. A regency commission was established to examine the various claims, with the Spanish king Philip II pushing his candidacy, to unite the Iberian Peninsula. In June 1580, Don Antonio was chosen by the Portuguese, causing Philip to invade and quickly conquer the kingdom. Don Antonio's agents came into French exile in 1581 and were received at Blois in April. Catherine and Henry agreed to organise an expedition in support of the conde de Vimioso to capture the Açores, which Spain had not yet seized. To lead this expedition Filippo Strozzi and Brissac were selected. Strozzi began raising forces in Guyenne, assembling 5000 men. Meanwhile, Brissac raised 1200 soldiers in Normandy. Philip's ambassador protested, when rumours of these preparations leaked, but Catherine explained Portugal belonged to her. If Felipe wished to avoid an invasion he could gift his daughter in marriage to Alençon, the king's brother, with the Netherlands as her dowry.

After some negotiations, Catherine and Henry decided in favour of the expedition, on 3 May 1582, Strozzi was ordered to make for Madeira, and use it as a springboard to capture the Azores, then to head to Brasil. Brissac was tasked with occupying Cape Verde. Brissac assembled the forces for the expedition at Belle Île where they were boarded on to ships. Strozzi in overall command, decided to set sail on 16 June. Their forces landed on the São Miguel Island, the only defended island in the chain, and on 16 July they attacked the fort on the island. A fleet arrived by the island to relieve the fort, and the French hurriedly reboarded their ships to face their opponent. In the battle that followed on 26 July, Brissac and several other ships charged the larger fleet, but they were soon surrounded, and Strozzi killed. Brissac and his sailors fought valiantly, but Brissac, concerned at the size of the fleet arrayed against him decided to retreat back to France. He was able to extract 30 ships from the disaster back to the safety of a French port. Catherine now turned to Brissac to lead another expedition to the Açores himself, but Henry intervened, asking her to leave the choice to Admiral Joyeuse, his favourite. Henry blamed Brissac in part for the loss. Joyeuse selected Aymar de Chastes, who led a similarly disastrous expedition.

=== Invasion of England ===
With no more opportunities for him from the royal court, Brissac turned to the duke of Guise to provide him with advancement. Guise was planning an invasion of England in favour of his cousin Mary, Queen of Scots. In August 1583, he was at Le Havre at the head of an army, which was to be under the joint command of himself and Aumale. Elbeuf meanwhile readied ships for the crossing at Harfleur. With regular planning sessions occurring between the duke and his allies at the Château de Meilleraye under the auspices of Jean de Moy, Brissac arrived from Le Havre with bad news. Sailing would need to be postponed due to lack of funds, Guise responded by withdrawing the funds he had put towards the operation, and the scheme died.

In the reshuffle that followed the death of Alençon, heir to the throne. Bouchage took charge of Touraine, Maine, Perche. He further took over Anjou in October 1584, succeeding the recently deceased Puygaillard in the governate. As one of his first acts, he established Brissac as commander of the Château d'Angers.

=== Second Catholic ligue ===
In September 1584, the Catholic League, which had been dormant since 1576, was refounded by the Lorraine family to oppose the succession of the Protestant Navarre, distant cousin to the king, to the throne. Many grandees joined the League shortly thereafter, among them the disgraced favourites François d'O and François d'Espinay; and allies of the Lorraine's the baron de Sennecey and Brissac. Brissac turned to his fidèle in Poitou for recruitment in the following months. In March 1585, the ligueurs entered open war with the crown after the duke of Guise occupied Châlons. Brissac, working as Elbeuf's primary lieutenant in Normandy, raised an army in the province while Elbeuf was still in Paris. Brissac arrived outside Rouen in March, and began raising funds by selling rentes in the city. Elbeuf first escorted Cardinal Bourbon to Péronne before moving into Normandy to support Brissac, who in Elbeuf's absence was holding the fort in Angers. Together the majority of the cities of Normandy fell to them, with an army of up to 6000 men. Their force operated separately from the main ligueur force under Guise. In May, Brissac campaigned alongside Claude de La Châtre, Entragues and Beaupré in the siege of Gien. Épernon departed Paris on 30 May to relieve the city from their efforts, and was able to lift it several days later without a fight.

=== War against the Protestants ===
With the ligueur triumph at the Treaty of Nemours, Navarre was excluded from the succession, Henry promised a war against heresy, and the ligueur leaders received various cities as surety. Brissac found himself at odds with the bourgeois of Angers, who resented his governorship. Hoping to take advantage of this, the Protestant prince of Condé and sieur de Rochemorte seized the Château of the city in September. However their coup soon began to stall, the population while resenting Brissac, had no desire to be ruled by Protestants, and resisted attempts to take the town. Soon the governor of Anjou Bouchagae, his brother the royal favourite Joyeuse and La Châtre came to the relief of Angers, driving Condé's forces from the city. The king let it be known that despite what the Treaty of Nemours might say, he did not desire Brissac to be restored to command in the city.

In December, Joyeuse purchased the government of the Château from him for 36,000 livres. Guise was not happy to see his political ally removed from control of this strategic position and in March 1586 protested to Henry. Joyeuse refused to yield the Château and installed a reliable supporter of the king in it. Henry meanwhile encouraged Joyeuse to go further, supporting an attempt by him to acquire Brouage from Saint-Luc, Brissac's brother-in-law, and another ligueur ally.

=== Day of the Barricades ===
At a family meeting in January 1588, the Lorraine family took stock of their situation. It was agreed they would redouble their effort to seize towns. Brissac and Elbeuf were tasked with frustrating Épernon's ability to operate as governor of Normandy. Épernon, and then the king soon visited his governate, frustrating their plans for Rouen.

Brissac played a key role in the events of the Day of the Barricades. Present in the city when Henry introduced his troops, Brissac was tasked by Guise with investigating the reason barricades had been thrown up by the people of Paris. He and his captains crossed the bridges to the left bank of the Seine, approaching the hot spots of the riot without incident. Negotiations were presently underway, and he was assumed to have peaceable intentions by the guards on the bridge. He engaged in a rousing speech in a house of a prominent ligueur to a group of militia officers urging them to fight for their liberty and the Catholic faith.

They assaulted royalist positions, easily bringing the small groups of troops they encountered to flight. He coordinated his actions with François de Moy, who pushed through the Pont Saint-Michel. Brissac for his part drove onto the Île de la Cité, pushing back the king's Swiss guard before him, all the way to the Pont Notre Dame. Henry now begged Guise to bring the Parisian population to order, so that the lives of his troops could be spared. Guise was delighted to be offered the role of broker, and calmed the population, allowing for the remaining royal forces to be extricated from the city. Guise saw the population of Paris as a means to an end, through the continued application of pressure on the king, he increased his power over the monarchy. As such he made it clear to Brissac to prepare for further confrontations the next day. Through the night of 12 May, Brissac organised and armed the students of the university.

By morning of 13 May he was at the head of 800 armed students and a further 400 monks, equipped with everything from swords to butchers' spits. That morning, Henry intercepted a letter in which Guise bragged of his control of the Louvre and announced that he was summoning more troops into the city. Fearing he was to be captured by the ligueurs he slipped out the capital quietly, leaving it in the hands of the ligue who established a radical administration known as the Seize.

=== Estates General of 1588 ===
The ligueur movement campaigned hard for the Estates General of 1588. Brissac stood as a deputy for Caux, for which he was elected. When the Estates assembled in Blois, Brissac was elected as the président of the Second Estate, the nobility, putting him at the head of 180 delegates. To assist him in leading the Estate was the baron de Magnac an obscure noble from Limousin. The nobility would ultimately have a fairly minor role in the sessions that followed, opposition to the king largely coming from the Third Estate. When word came that the duke of Savoie had invaded Saluzzo, royalist delegates were initially able to take charge of the Second Estate in a patriotic fervour and lead them to advocate a war with Spain. However the ligueur representatives restored their control and the Second Estate returned to following the demands advocated for by the First, a war against heresy.

After the assassination of the duke of Guise, Henry moved fast to sweep up the leading ligueurs who were present in the city. Brissac was with the Estates when the grand prévôt Richelieu burst in with a company of arquebusiers and halted the session. He informed the delegates someone had attempted to kill the king and began to arrest the most prominent ligueurs. The duke's young son Guise was arrested, alongside Brissac and Elbeuf a cousin of Guise. The leader of the Third Estate, La Chapelle-Marteau, who had been made prévôt des marchands of Paris by the ligue after the Day of the Barricades was also arrested. He was not to remain a prisoner long, as Henry keen to ensure that the Estates were able to conclude their business, freed him so he could return to his responsibilities with the Second Estate.

=== War against the king ===
The Estates were formerly closed on 16 January. The deputies retired back to their home provinces, with Brissac heading off to Anjou. He waited there for a while for a call to come, letting it be known that he was ill. By March his 'illness' had passed, and he had rejoined his ligueur compatriots in their war against the crown. He entered the suburbs of Angers on 28 March with his retinue the citing having fallen to the ligue a month prior on 20 February. He exploited the religious fervour in the city due to it being holy week to bring these forces in. Rochepot, who was at the Ponts-de-Cé demanded this be reversed, on threat of his entering Angers with 1500 men. The city government, not particularly keen on a military occupation by either Rochepot or Brissac decided to act. The non native ligueur troops under Brissac were asked to depart from the suburbs, as was the royalist governor La Rochepot and his forces. Brissac began his withdrawal, but soon word arrived that the royalist Marshal Aumont was approaching the city with some Picard regiments. Brissac returned quickly, bringing troops into the city proper while barricades were thrown up again and the gates secured by the ligueurs. Despite this, Aumont was able to recapture the city on 1 April.

A state of civil war now existed between the crown and ligue. Brissac raised peasant levies in Normandy in to relieve the ligueur town of Falaise which was being besieged by the duke of Montpensier. This was despite the fact, that in prior years, his troops had been among the worst offenders of cruelties to the peasants of Normandy. The Gautier peasants which formed the majority of his force numbered 16,000 strong. The peasants had a strict hierarchy under their elected captain Vaumartel. Several aristocratic ligueur lords worked with them, the sieur de Longchamp governor of Lisieux and Brissac's lieutenant the baron de Beaulieu. Montpensier detached forces from the siege of Falaise and descended upon the assembled Gautier force. The engagement that followed was a slaughter, with 3000 killed, and another 1000 captured. Montpensier chased the remainder of the peasants into the Bernay, but was persuaded by priests in their number to pardon the rest if they returned to their fields. Brissac who had watched the slaughter from a nearby hill withdrew with his cavalry, Longchamp and Beaulieu had also betrayed the Gautier and abandoned them in their flight. Brissac had succeeded in his primary objective, to relieve the siege of Falaise. The Gautier movement would not however die, and the receipts of the taille would still be reduced in 1594 due to ongoing insurgency.

== Reign of Henry IV ==
The Assassination of Henri III led to the end of the siege on Paris, with Navarre, now styling himself Henry IV entering Normandy with the remnants of the royal army. Many towns in Normandy gave their submission to him, among them Dieppe. Rouen however refused, and Aumale and Brissac who were present in the city, called urgently for Mayenne to arrive to resist Henry. In September Mayenne was handed a bruising defeat at Arques in Normandy. Brissac fought with Mayenne during the battle.

Mayenne was unwilling to counternance the social radicalism of the ligue, and when opportunity arose he subverted their conseil de l'union, and moved power to his own conseil de l'état. Unlike the ligueur council, this was filled with powerful aristocrats that Mayenne trusted. Among them were his cousins Aumale and Elbeuf; the lieutenant-general of Champagne de Rosne, the governor of Bourges La Châtre and Brissac.

=== Poitiers ===
In February 1592, the governor of Poitiers, La Guierche, was killed in a skirmish with royal forces in the confines of his seigneurie. The ligueurs in Poitiers had despised La Guierche, and were happy to be free of him. To replace him as governor of the city, Mayenne selected Brissac. Brissac wrote to the hôtel de ville to inform them of his appointment on 1 March. Mayenne wrote separately the following day to tell them both Brissac and the young duke of Guise would be arriving shortly. The city ligueurs were delighted, Brissac had a strong reputation as a military commander and supporter of the radical ligue. Guise would not however arrive, to the town's disappointment, being assigned as governor of Champagne shortly thereafter. In June rumours of Brissac's imminent arrival led to hurried preparations, with a residence and furniture commandeered.

Brissac for his part did not arrive until 28 September. Brissac proved a far more autocratic governor than the ligueurs in Poitiers had hoped, after his arrival, he quickly transferred the ligueur holy council into an advisory body as Mayenne had done in Paris. Where previously the council had determined the distribution of captures made in battles, Brissac now claimed them as his own. The mayor was circumvented, with ordinances being signed by Brissac's secretary and by mid-October the council was only meeting in his absence. The city administration remonstrated against him arguing for him to allow the mayor to participate in city governance but added the meek addendum that they would not press the matter if he was adamant. Brissac was adamant and roughly rebuffed their remonstration. When allocating a new building to the friars of St François de Paul of Plessis-lès-Tours, he signed it in the manner of a sovereign monarch. In summer 1593, the city was subject to royal blockade but was able to hold out. Brissac played an active role in the defence and was severely wounded during a sortie.

=== Betrayal of Paris ===
Mayenne appointed Brissac as governor of Paris in December 1593, he hoped to replace the former governor François de Belin, who was suspected of royalist sympathies with someone more reliable. Belin for his part was banished from the city. Despite this, he quickly began planning to hand over the city to Henry in January 1594. Brissac quietly sounded out the Parlementaires and other city elites, and found they were open to a royal entry. Under various pretexts he had the most diehard ligueur militia members assigned to missions outside the city. Despite the perilous situation around the capital, the Spanish were caught off guard when the time came. Mayenne for his part departed the capital on 6 March, perhaps suspecting the cities days were numbered. Brissac departed the city in mid-March for two days, and on his return, plead with the Cardinal for forgiveness for speaking with heretics, which was promptly granted. The Cardinal was not aware however that the talks Brissac referred to were negotiations with the king at Saint-Denis. By 19 March rumours were swirling that the Bastille was to be 'handed over to the enemy' and the Seize came to Brissac seeking his reassurance that the rumours the city was to be betrayed and handed to the king were false, he reassured them that such rumours were indeed manufactured.

Late on 21 March Brissac prepared his troops across the city for the coup of the next day. On 22 March his forces approached the capital from three directions, Brissac and the prévôt des marchands Pierre Lhullier ensured that two gates were open and the chain on the Seine lifted by 04:00. He met with his royalist brother-in-law the comte de Saint-Luc at the Porte Neuve, Saint-Luc brought with him many of Henry's senior lieutenants. Other points of access to the city were secured by the royalists. By 06:00 Henry felt comfortable to enter the city, he was welcomed at the gate by Brissac and other municipal leaders. Delighted Henry draped Brissac in his white sash and attended a mass at Notre-Dame. The remaining diehard ligueurs in the city, Crucé and Hamilton, vainly attempted to rally the population against his entry, but they found little interest. The Spanish garrison filed out of the city shortly thereafter, Henry allowing their captain Feria to have his troops depart with full military honours. Betraying the capital offered Brissac both personal advantage, and also avoided the consequences of a forceful reduction of the key city.

=== Reward ===
Henry had already promised the governorship of Paris to François d'O, former favourite of Henry III, so Brissac's compensation for his betrayal had to come from elsewhere. He received a monetary gift of 600,000 livres, a pension of a further 20,000 livres, the confirmation of his ligueur granted rank of marshal as a royal marshal, and the governorship of Mantes and Corbeil. His sister Jeanne had assisted him in the negotiation of these returns.

He received further signs of favour in 1595, when Henry appointed him as a knight of the Order of the Holy Spirit.

=== Final ligueurs ===
Now a royalist, Marshal Brissac was tasked with campaigning against the duke of Mercœur in Brittany, while Henry campaigned against Spain in the north east. The fight was difficult, and by 1597, Mercœur would be the last French ligueur hold out, in a war that was increasingly France against Spain. Brissac ensured pressure was applied against Mercœur during his campaigns in Brittany, even if he was unable to subjugate him alone. After Mercœurs' submission he would be replaced as governor of Brittany by Henry's illegitimate son César de Bourbon, duke of Vendôme who married Mercœur's daughter. Brissac served as Vendôme's lieutenant in the region.

== Reign of Louis XIII ==
In the penultimate year of his life, 1620, Louis XIII erected the county of Brissac into a duché-pairie for his services to the crown. He died in 1621.

== Sources ==
- Babelon, Jean-Pierre (2009). Henri IV (in French). Paris: Fayard. ISBN 978-2213644028.
- Bernstein, Hilary (2004). Between Crown and Community: Politics and Civic Culture in Sixteenth-Century Poitiers. Ithaca and London: Cornell University Press. ISBN 978-0-8014-4234-6.
- Carroll, Stuart (2005). Noble Power During the French Wars of Religion: The Guise Affinity and the Catholic Cause in Normandy. Cambridge University Press. ISBN 978-0-521-62404-6.
- Carroll, Stuart (2011). Martyrs and Murderers: The Guise Family and the Making of Europe. Oxford University Press. ISBN 978-0-19-922907-9.
- Cloulas, Ivan (1979). Catherine de Médicis (in French). Paris: Fayard. ISBN 978-2-213-00738-0.
- Constant, Jean-Marie (1984). Les Guise (in French). Hachette.
- Constant, Jean-Marie (1996). La Ligue (in French). Paris: Fayard. ISBN 978-2-213-59488-0.
- Holt, Mack P. (2005). The French Wars of Religion, 1562-1629 (2nd ed.). Cambridge: Cambridge University Press. ISBN 978-0-511-81792-2.
- Jouanna, Arlette (1998). Histoire et Dictionnaire des Guerres de Religion (in French). Bouquins. ISBN 978-2-221-07425-1.
- Knecht, Robert (2014) [1998]. Catherine de' Medici. Routledge. ISBN 978-0-582-08241-0.
- Knecht, Robert (2010). The French Wars of Religion, 1559-1598 (3rd ed.). Routledge. ISBN 978-1-4082-2819-7.
- Knecht, Robert (2016). Hero or Tyrant? Henry III, King of France, 1574-1589. Routledge. ISBN 978-1-4724-2930-8.
- Pitts, Vincent (2012). Henri IV of France: His Reign and Age. Baltimore: Johns Hopkins University Press. ISBN 978-0-8018-9027-7.
- Roelker, Nancy (1996). One King, One Faith: The Parlement of Paris and the Religious Reformation of the Sixteenth Century. University of California Press. ISBN 978-0-520-34495-2.
- Le Roux, Nicolas (2000). La Faveur du Roi: Mignons et Courtisans au Temps des Derniers Valois [The King's Favor: Mignons and Courtiers in the Time of the Last Valois] (in French). Champ Vallon. ISBN 978-2-87673-907-9.
- Le Roux, Nicolas (2006). Un Régicide au nom de Dieu: L'Assassinat d'Henri III [A Regicide in the Name of God: The Assassination of Henry III] (in French). Paris: Gallimard. ISBN 978-2070735297.
- Salmon, J.H.M (1979). Society in Crisis: France during the Sixteenth Century. London: Ernest Benn. ISBN 978-0-510-26351-5.
- Sutherland, Nicola Mary (1980). The Huguenot Struggle for Recognition. New Haven and London: Yale University Press. ISBN 978-0-300-02328-2.
