= François d'Espinay =

Late 16th-century French royal favourite and military commander

- seigneur de Saint-Luc
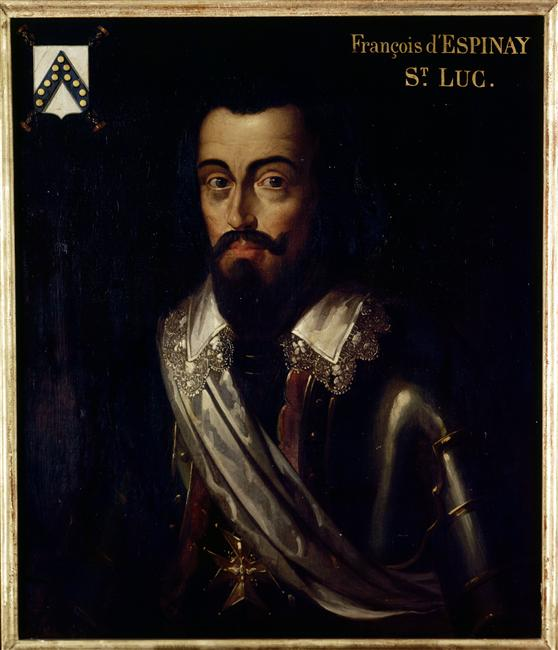
- Sixteenth Century portrait of Saint-Luc
- Born: 1554
- Died: 8 September 1597 (aged 42–43); Amiens
- Noble family: Maison d'Espinay
- Spouse: Jeanne de Cossé
- Issue: Timoléon d'Espinay; Artus d'Espinay; Charles d'Espinay; François d'Espinay
- Father: Valéran d'Espinay
- Mother: Marguerite de Groucher

François d'Espinay, seigneur de Saint-Luc et baron de Crèvecœur (1554 –8 September 1597) was a French noble, courtier, military commander and governor during the later French Wars of Religion. Born into the middling Norman nobility as a son of Valéran d'Espinay and Marguerite de Groucher, Saint-Luc had his debut into French politics with his participation in the siege of La Rochelle in 1573 in which he was injured. When the king's brother, the Duke of Anjou was elected king of the Commonwealth he travelled with the duke to his new kingdom, serving as his Chambellan in the country. Upon Anjou's return to France as Henri III, Saint-Luc maintained his proximity to the king, holding various positions in his household. A man with significant skill in war, he served the crown during the fifth war of religion, fighting at Guise's celebrated victory of Dormans. In the following civil war he fought under the command of the king's brother Alençon at the sieges of La Charité-sur-Loire and Issoire. He was rewarded for his military service with command of various regiments and the position of maître de camp. At the end of the sixth war of religion, the duke of Mayenne secured the strategic Guyenne town of Brouage, which controlled a deep port and salt production. In December 1578 Saint-Luc was appointed governor of Brouage. In May 1579 he added the governate of Aunis to his responsibilities. In the autumn he accompanied Catherine de Medici, mother to the queen on her mission to negotiate with Henri's disgraced favourite Marshal Bellegarde who had set himself up in rebellion.

In February 1580, Saint-Luc entered rebellion himself and fled from court to Brouage. A host of reasons have been proposed by contemporaries and later historians for his disgrace. In the following months he and the local royal commander postured and negotiated, before he was brought back into obedience with a compromise in June by which he agreed to divest himself of his governate in return for financial compensation, forgiveness and the release of his wife Jeanne de Cossé from royal captivity. He would not however yield Brouage, and he remained distrusted by Henri. Looking for a new patron, he supported Alençon in his campaigns into Nederland. He stayed with Alençon until the disaster of the surprise of Antwerp. Upon the death of Alençon in July 1584, the king's heir due to his childlessness, he aligned himself with the Catholic ligue that was established by the Lorraine family to oppose the succession of the Protestant Navarre. He fought with the ligue against the king in 1585, which convinced Henri he needed to re-secure good terms with his former favourite. With peace in September, the king made an offer to buy him out of Brouage for 300,000 livres, however this did not go anywhere. With the crown now at war with the Protestants as a term of the peace, he was unsuccessfully besieged by Navarre's cousin the prince of Condé. In 1587 he was captured at the disastrous Battle of Coutras, fought against Navarre. Upon the death of Henri III, he quickly flocked to Navarre's banner, despite his Protestantism and fought against the Catholic ligue that opposed him. He was rewarded with the post of lieutenant-general of Bretagne in 1592, then lieutenant-general of Picardie in April 1596. Established as grand maître de l'artillerie on the resignation of La Guiche he would die in the conduct of this charge on 8 September 1597 during the siege of Amiens.

== Early life and family ==
=== Family ===
François d'Espinay was born in 1554, the son of Valéran d'Espinay and Marguerite de Groucher. His family was a member of the ancient middle nobility of the region of haute Normandie, which claimed to have ruled the fief of Hayes since the 12th century. The lands of Saint-Luc's seigneurie were acquired by the family at the end of the 15th century, and were located around Évreux His father Valéran d'Espinay was a gentilhomme de la chambre for Henri II as well as his écuyer d'écurie and governor of Louviers. He would serve the duke of Guise as the guidon of his company, fighting in Italia, where he would die in 1557 during the Battle of Guastalla.

=== Marriage and children ===
A marriage contract was signed between Saint-Luc and Jeanne de Cossé on 26 January 1578. The two were married on 9 February 1578 at the Louvre. The event was a flashpoint for relations between the king and his brother, with one of Henri's favourites Maugiron taking the opportunity of the ball to celebrate the match to insult the prince to his face. This secured an alliance for him with the powerful Cossé family, who were associated with the king's brother Alençon. Jeanne had been promised in marriage to the comte de La Roche-Guyon who was furious at the move. La Roche-Guyon departed court shortly thereafter, and did not return to January 1585, having been involved in many seditions during his absence.

Jeanne would have responsibility for managing the families domestic affairs. She received the homages given to the couple by their vassals in the Cambrésis. On 2 May 1578 Saint-Luc provided her with the power of attorney for all the families affairs. The couple had possession of several boats, and were able to use them to considerable financial advantage, with the ships manager owing Saint-Luc 50,000 livres in September 1578. This worked well with the control of Brouage's salt.

Together the two would have children:

- Timoléon d'Espinay (1580-1644), governor of Brouage and lieutenant-general of Guyenne
- Artus d'Espinay (-1629), abbé de Redon, Bishop of Marseille
- Charles d'Espinay (-1622), commander of Harleux
- François d'Espinay, commander of Sepoix

In 1579, Henri granted him the Château de Beaulieu, near Rozay-en-Brie. Henri would further grant the Abbey of Cercamp to a relative of Saint-Luc's. To ensure he was aware of ecclesiastical vacancies at the first opportunity, he had a network of spies in Normandie, so that he could quickly request their granting in ways that suited his families interests.

=== Reputation ===
Saint-Luc was considered by the contemporary historian Brantôme as the model of an ideal soldier-courtier. While he was in favour, Henri III nicknamed him le petiot. While in his exile in Brouage, he and his wife founded a small academy in the town. He had a penchant for composing verse. The contemporary writer Claude Haton by contrast disapproved of the rapid advance in royal favour of a man who was just a 'poor and simple gentleman'.

== Reign of Charles IX ==
Unlike many of his contemporaries who would become leading courtiers in the 1570s, Saint-Luc did not benefit from having powerful family members at court to protect his rise.

=== Siege of La Rochelle ===
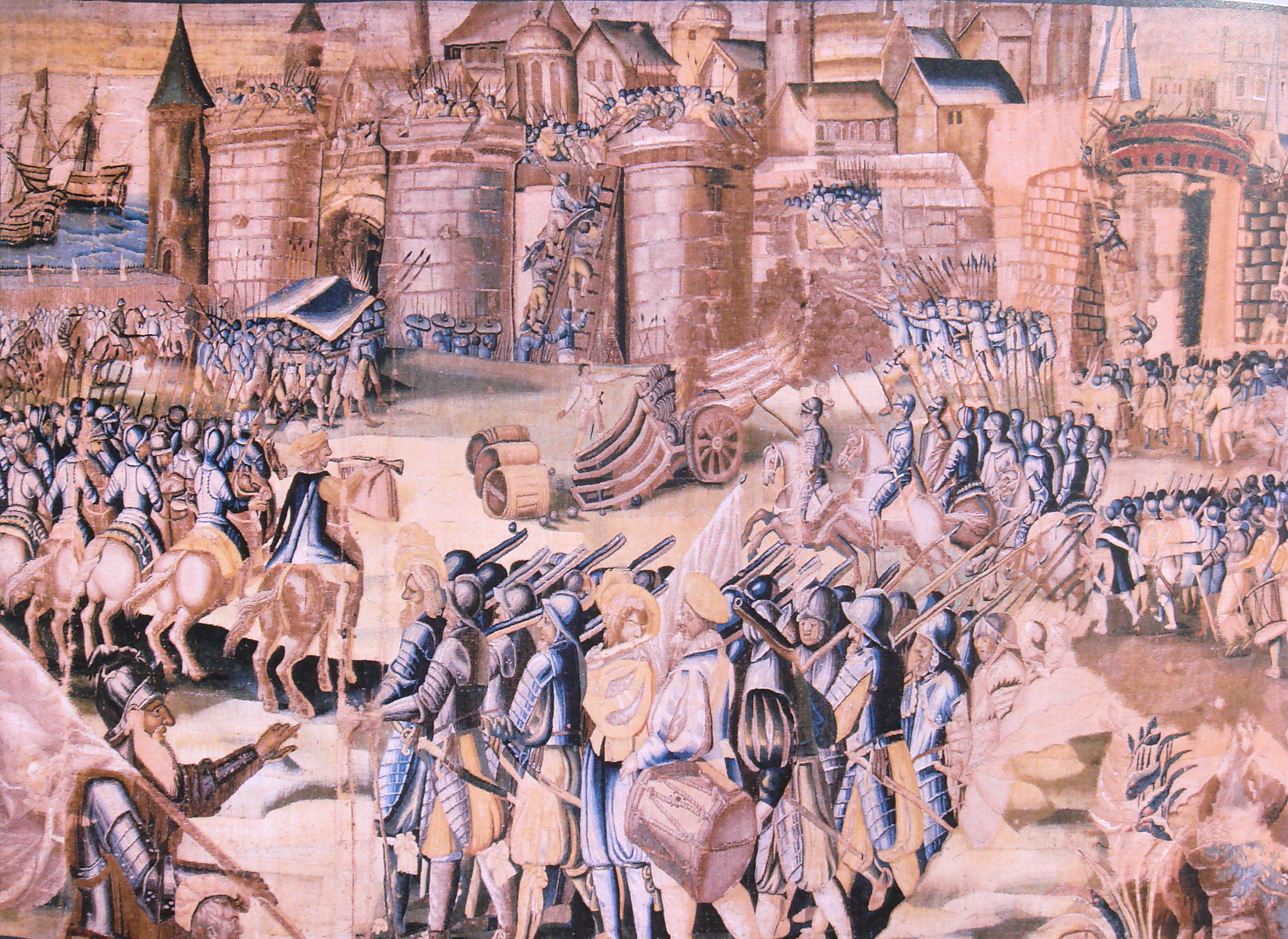
Tapestry depicting the conduct of the siege of La Rochelle

With La Rochelle entering rebellion in response to the Massacre of Saint Bartholomew. The king tasked his brother Anjou with reducing the city. Many young nobles flocked with the prince for their first taste of combat, among them Caylus Saint-Sulpice and Saint-Luc. During the siege they had the ability to interact far more freely with their social superior than in the surrounds of court. In a particularly bloody assault on the city on 7 April, many leading nobles were injured, with Saint-Luc receiving a wound to his eye.

When word arrived at the siege lines that Anjou had been elected as king of the Commonwealth, Saint-Luc was among those young men who accompanied the prince to join his court in the eastern kingdom. Like many other nobles who had been with Anjou during the siege, Saint-Luc received the office of Chambellan in the king's household during his tenure in the Commonwealth. In September 1576 he would again be granted the office of Chambellan by the king of France, establishing continuity with the privilege he had enjoyed abroad. He would only hold this office for a year however. Unlike many of Anjou's travelling companions, Saint-Luc stayed with the king in the Commonwealth until his departure back to France upon the death of Charles IX.

== Reign of Henri III ==
=== Fifth civil war ===
Upon Anjou's return to France as Henri III he arrived to a civil war between the crown and various Malcontents. Saint-Luc would fight for the crown during the war. He saw combat at the Battle of Dormans where the duke of Guise confronted the vanguard of a Protestant mercenary army under Casimir that was attempting to invade the kingdom in support of domestic rebels. Guise was able to defeat the vanguard. In the course of the campaign, Saint-Luc received a wound to his arm.

After the murder of his favourite Guast, Henri's attentions turned towards Saint-Luc. He was one of the four men Henri termed Ma Troupe in his letters, alongside Caylus, D'O and Saint-Sulpice.

During 1576 Henri rewarded him for his service with a promotion to the highest chivalric order of the kingdom, that of Saint-Michel, receiving the promotion at the same time as another favourite Entragues. He was also made a gentilhomme de la chambre du roi alongside his responsibilities as Chambellan, granting him a further income of 600 livres.

=== Sixth civil war ===
During the sixth civil war, Saint-Luc found himself in command of the Piedmont regiments. In March 1577 he was granted a further honour to command a Lyonnaise company of 200 men. He fought with his men in the main royal army under the command of the king's brother Alençon at the siege of the Protestant held La Charité-sur-Loire, which was concluded with a vicious sack. The royal army then moved to reduce Issoire, with Saint-Luc supporting the prince in the capture of the town, which fell on 11 June, being subject to another brutal sack. After siege of Issoire, the royal army disintegrated for lack of pay and Henri looked to establish a new peace. Saint-Luc meanwhile had departed the army to move to the court, which was staying at Poitiers. From Poitiers he wrote to the duke of Nevers who was the de facto leader of the royal army, given Alençon's inexperience, describing his infinite debts to the duke for protecting him at court and describing how he would forever be the duke's servant. Through this outreach to Nevers, he diversified his patronage, ensuring he was wholly reliant on the king's favour for his position.

=== Brouage ===
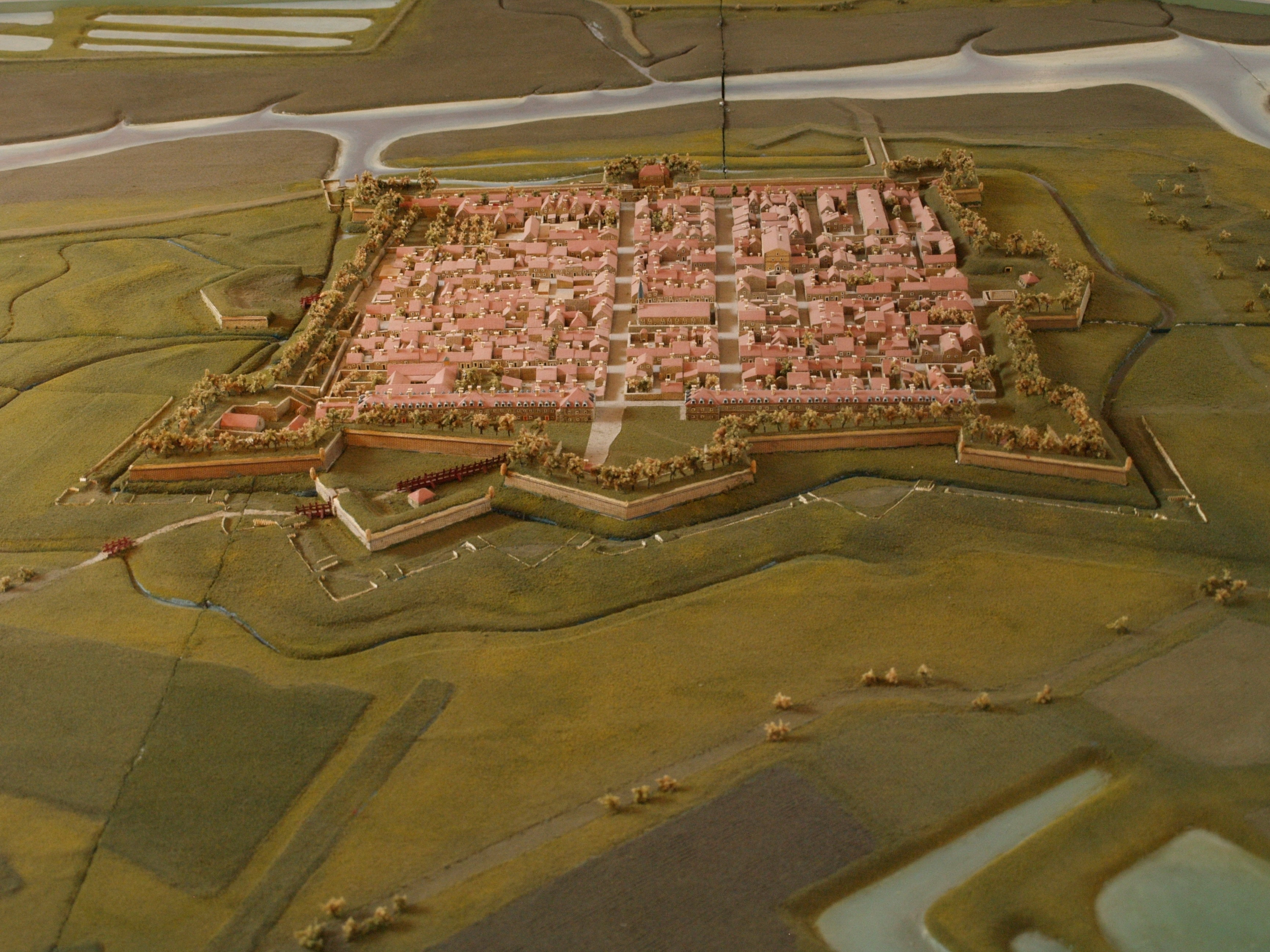
Model of the Citadel de Brouage during the Seventeenth Century

Mayenne, having fought independently of the royal army secured the valuable and strategic marsh town of Hiers-Brouage for the crown on 21 August 1577, Henri, having integrated the settlement into the royal domain on 17 March 1578, chose to distribute the charge of governor to the seigneur de Lanssac who had supported Mayenne in the siege. Though small, Brouage could boast a deep water port; allowed competition for the control of the coastline with Bordeaux and La Rochelle; and had extensive salt works. Saint-Luc took over as the towns governor in December 1578, assuming the charge on 10 February of the following year, accompanied on his entrance to Brouage by Lanssac. In return for the privilege Saint-Luc promised to pay Lanssac the sum of 65,700 livres for his dispossession. He would not however fully honour his fiscal obligations to Lanssac, with only 6900 livres having reached the former governor by April. In combination with this governorship he received that of the Île d'Oléron and Ré. As a Norman noble, Saint-Luc lacked connections in the region, making his command there challenging. Henri also moved him from command of the peripheral regiment to control of the Picard regiment, much to the annoyance of D'O, who had coveted the role.

Saint-Luc wrote bitterly to the duke of Nevers, complaining of the state that Lanssac had left Brouage in for him. For the administration of the town, Saint-Luc established a client of his from Normandie, Jean de Rivery-Potonville, who would hold his post in the town until his death in 1604.

=== Ascendency ===
1578 was a year of further advancement for Saint-Luc, as he received first the office of premier maître de camp de l'infanterie française in the spring, before becoming captain of the gendarmes in the summer. Henri's sister Marguerite de Valois, alleges that though Henri's favourites did not participate in the conseil des affaires, they formed a shadow council, that she dubbed the conseil de Jereboam. Among those she alleged as participating in such an alternate council were Saint-Luc, Caylus and Maugiron. In the year 1578, he would also be elevated to the rank of baron, through the elevation of his holding of Crèvecœur.

An ambitious man, Saint-Luc hoped both to be raised to the title of duke, as several favourites of Henri would be in the 1580s, and to attain the office of grand écuyer which was held by Léonor Chabot. He was increasingly frustrated by his failure to attain this office, or an elevation to the rank of duke. Upon complaining about the advances of Joyeuse, Henri informed his favourite that he been generous to Saint-Luc, and that he should be content with this.

Alongside many other favourites of Henri, Saint-Luc held a loathing for the chief favourite of the king's brother Alençon, Bussy d'Amboise. On 1 February 1578 Saint-Luc allied himself with D'O and Caylus in an attempt to surprise and kill Bussy at the porte Saint-Honoré. Their attack was unsuccessful, with Bussy evading the attempt. Saint-Luc also collaborated with Maugiron in an effort to intimidate another of Alençon's favourites Claude de La Châtre by ensuring he lost a court case he was involved in. They hoped this would detach him from the princes following, however it would not.

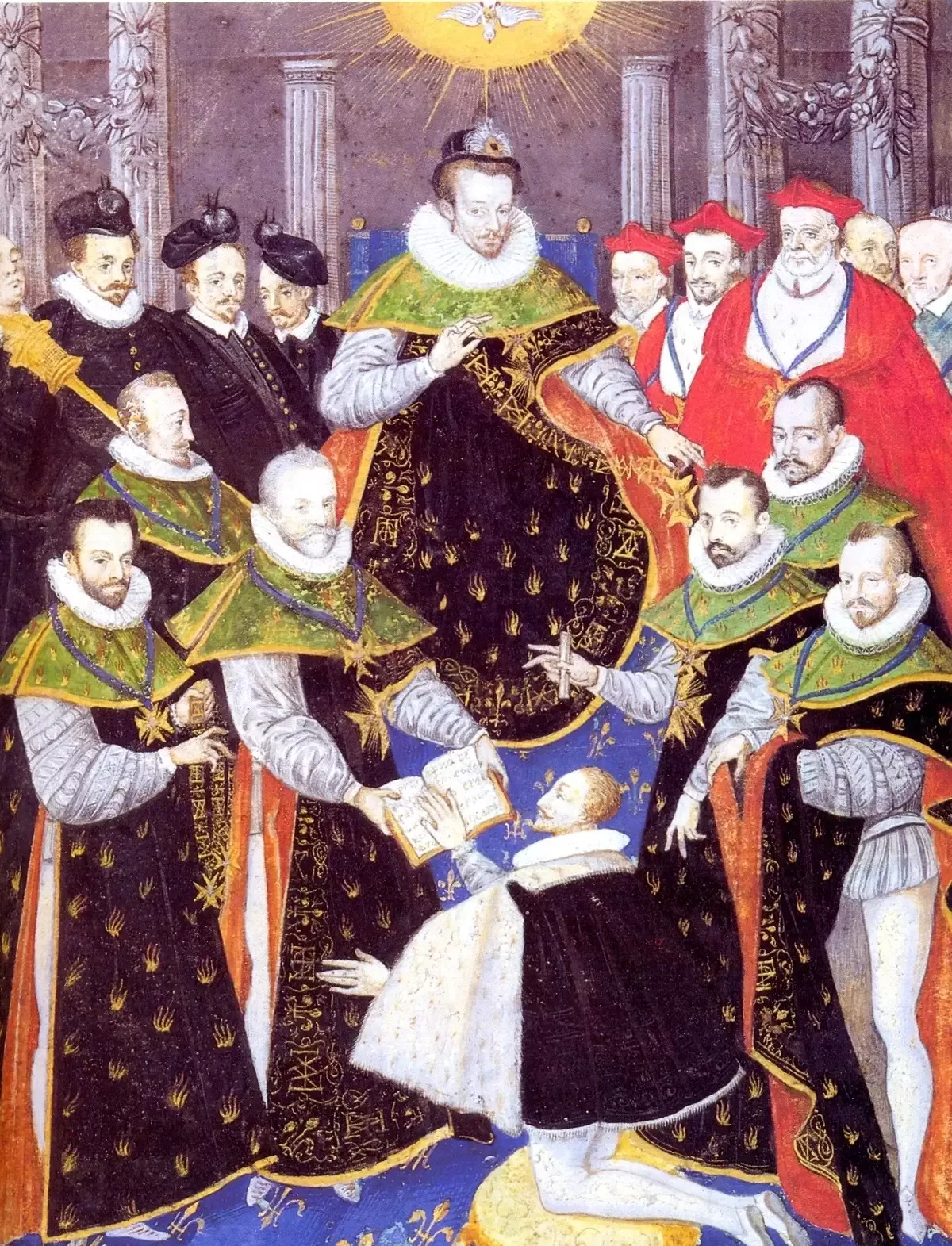
Henri III receives one of the first chevaliers of his new order, the duke of Nevers

Henri was unsatisfied by the dilution of the Ordre de Saint-Michel that had developed in the proceeding decade from its over-conferring. To this end he established a new highest order of chivalry, that of Saint-Esprit. On 1 January 1579 he received the first cohort of chevaliers, twenty six men for a grand ceremony at the Hôtel de Nantouillet. The king oversaw the ceremony, accompanied by a large retinue of men from his court, with the four men closest to him dressed identically, to convey their paramount status in his favour. It was these men who succeeded the recently deceased Caylus and Maugiron in his inner circle. The four were D'O, Joyeuse, Épernon and Saint-Luc.

In May 1579, Saint-Luc added the governorship of Aunis to his command of Brouage, further consolidating his influence in the western region.

During August 1579, Henri dispatched his mother Catherine de Medici to confront his renegade favourite Bellegarde who had established himself in rebellion in south east France. Many grand nobles accompanied Catherine on her mission, among them Saint-Luc. Saint-Luc served as Catherine's intermediary with the court to explain the progression of the negotiations she was undertaking. She complemented Saint-Luc as having done 'very well' with the charge the king had entrusted him for the mission. A settlement was reached to bring Bellegarde back into obedience, though he would be dead several months later.

=== Fall from grace ===
Saint-Luc's relationship with the king developed problems at the beginning of 1580. At this time he was accustomed to sleeping within the royal apartments themselves, having a chamber on the first floor. He allegedly attempted to seduce the queen, who promptly reported his advances to her husband. Alternatively to these alleged transgressions, Henri was frustrated at Saint-Luc's increasing proximity to his brother, Saint-Luc having sent a letter to Alençon in which he declared himself the prince's servant. He fundamentally misunderstood Alençon's political priorities at the time however, as disorder in the court was in his interest while he was negotiating marriage plans with England, and as such he would have shown the letter to the king. A rivalry which had developed between Saint-Luc and D'O also caused friction. Le Roux puts his support behind the final factor, arguing that the favourites of the king no longer saw themselves as a collective but as individuals struggling to secure a monopoly on royal favour for themselves. After his dispute with Joyeuse over the title of grand écuyer Saint-Luc allegedly exclaimed to the king 'Is it worth raising men up only to cast them down?' It is also possible that Saint-Luc saw advantage in the recent rebellion of Bellegarde as a model for his own behaviour. The contemporary historian Agrippa d'Aubigné explained Saint-Luc's disgrace as the result of a prank played with a blowpipe in which Saint-Luc pretended to be an angel chastising Henri for his sins in the hopes of frightening him. This is not however considered a credible explanation. Ultimately the primary cause of the disgrace cannot be discerned, with contemporaries unable to settle on any single explanation.

Henri was enraged at Saint-Luc, who was tipped off to the king's fury by the duke of Guise. Joyeuse described the king's emotions as being that of hatred. Shortly thereafter, Saint-Luc denounced Henri to the Papal Nuncio, and then fled court to his governate of Brouage. Henri had instructed Jacques Savary de Lancôme to keep him from fleeing to his governate, but he was able to slip out of court on 31 January with five men. Lancôme was on route to Brouage but was refused entry upon his arrival by Potonville, who allowed Saint-Luc to enter when he arrived several hours later Establishing himself in the city he drove away those troops loyal to Lancôme.

The nearby Rochelais population in the dark as to the situation at court worried his arrival was a presage to an attack. Henri set about seizing Saint-Luc's possessions in the capital, and Jeanne was arrested on 7 February, followed by his cousin Eustache d'Espinay who planned to join Saint-Luc with an armed force. Henri denounced his former favourite as a snake to his minister Villeroy, and looked to charge him with lèse majesté. Keen to ensure the rebellion was contained, Henri despatched his version of events to Elizabeth I, the queen of England, and the mayor of La Rochelle, so that neither would be tempted to align themselves with Saint-Luc. The Rochelais were reassured that Lancôme had no designs hostile to them. Saint-Luc for his part took the council of his wife Jeanne, who advised him in letters to seize the royal salt supply that Brouage controlled so the king could not have it. Having seized it Saint-Luc sold the supply to finance his exile. She also canvassed her family for support, and encouraged Norman rebels to travel to Brouage by sea. Her efforts brought forward fruit, when Marshal Cossé protested to the king about his nieces and niece-in-laws treatment.

Saint-Luc meanwhile was raising a cross-religion armed force with the funds he had raised, numbering 1200 men by the end of February. The king urged him to stand down. Negotiations between the two sides continued throughout the following month, with Saint-Luc announcing that he would concede the governorship of Brouage to anyone other than Lancôme on condition he be granted six months to sell his properties in France before heading into exile. In April Lancôme withdrew from his position in front of Brouage, and the comte de Lude refused the offer to replace him.

=== Cold reconciliation ===
Unable to countenance a military confrontation that might draw his brother and the duke of Guise into rebellion, Henri reluctantly compromised with Saint-Luc. On 6 June 1580 he agreed to abandon his governorship of Brouage to Charles de Belleville in return for financial compensation of 117,000 livres and a declaration of his innocence. His wife and cousin were freed from her arrest shortly thereafter. He would not however depart from Brouage. Espinay sought to mend his bridges with the king after this peace, writing to him persistently and defending his fidelity. During this period he also maintained a correspondence with Marguerite de Valois, queen of Navarre. Composing her poetry she maintained it in her collection. Henri did not however consider Saint-Luc innocent, and had chosen to tolerate his presence in Brouage as a necessary evil with the alternative being Protestant control.

Despite his departure from royal favour, Saint-Luc was able to secure for himself revenues of 18,000 livres during 1580. This was through a combination of his military commands and provincial offices that he had not been disposed of. He was the only member of the first generation of Henri's favourites who was able to establish himself in such a fashion.

=== Alençon ===
Giving up on the king, Saint-Luc turned to his brother for patronage, with no position in Henri's household, he became maître de la garde-robe for the duke and was a part of his retinue. By this means he ensured his protection from any revenge at the hands of the king.

During 1581, Épernon's agents established a rumour that Alençon was about to resume the civil wars, rejoining with the Protestants he had fought alongside in the fifth civil war, and his political allies such as Saint-Luc, who the prince had visited while in south west France.

Alençon was however seeking to establish himself as king of Nederland, not start a civil war. Saint-Luc accompanied the prince during his relief of the city of Cambrai which was besieged by a Spanish army under the duke of Parma. This accomplished, Saint-Luc wrote to Catherine de Medici, offering his services to the royal army for any planned expedition into Portugal. In 1582 he again participated in the military operations of Alençon in Nederland alongside his cousin Lignery. Only after the disastrous Surprise of Antwerp in January 1583 did he depart from Alençon's company and return to his governate.

As a governor, Saint-Luc had responsibilities pertaining to the enforcement of the various peace edicts. In 1583 he wrote to Henri with concern, as the Protestants of Arvert had recently re-established public worship in their community. He noted that such a move required explicit permission from the king according to the peace edict. He further elaborated on the potential risks the move posed, arguing that in three hours the Protestants of the town could fortify it in such a manner as to require a three-month siege to reduce, or even worse if a great Protestant lord like Navarre intervened.

=== Second Catholic ligue ===
In June 1584, Henri's brother Alençon died, meaning that the succession defaulted upon the king's distant Protestant cousin Navarre. In opposition to both this succession and other elements of royal policy, the Lorraine family refounded the Catholic ligue. They were able to rally to their side nobles who felt they had been left out in the cold away from royal favour among them Brissac, and the disgraced favourites of the king D'O and Saint-Luc. Saint-Luc was drawn into rebellion in the hopes of regaining royal favour, now that his alternate patron was dead, the explosive rise of Joyeuse and Épernon illustrating starkly what he could have had. Beauvais-Nangis explicitly justified both his own participation and that of Saint-Luc as a response to being driven out of court by Épernon's dominance. The ligueurs declared themselves in open rebellion with the duke of Guise's seizure of Châlons on 21 March 1585. During the conflict that followed Saint-Luc commanded ligueur forces.

The peace concluded with the ligue in September 1585 compelled the king into a new war against Protestantism. Now fighting with the king again instead of against him, Saint-Luc was besieged in Brouage by the Protestant prince of Condé, who was conducting an aggressive campaign, from 19 September. The port of the town was stormed by fourteen galleys under Condé's command. Condé however made himself vulnerable by dividing his forces so he might besiege Angers as well, and overstretched was bested and driven off by the comte de Bouchage, brother of Joyeuse.

=== Formal reconciliation ===
Sensitive to the motivations of those who had joined with the Lorraine's in the war of 1585, Henri sought to detach Saint-Luc from the ligueur opposition during 1586. He had been unable to return to royal favour for 5 years due to his lack of patron to intercede on his behalf with the king (D'O returned to favour more rapidly through the intercession of Joyeuse). In May 1586 Henri offered Saint-Luc 300,000 livres to sell the governate, five times what he had acquired it for back in 1578. His wife, Jeanne de Cossé led negotiations with the king, who wished to provide the governate to Joyeuse. Épernon was horrified that his rival for favour could be advantaged, and threatened to warn Saint-Luc to prevent Joyeuse's entry into Brouage. Despite being reintegrated into royal favour, Henri remained suspicious of Saint-Luc.

Saint-Luc meanwhile was reinventing himself into an ardent enemy of Protestantism, largely out of concern that La Rochelle might threaten his governorship of Brouage. He held meetings with Lanssac, who had established himself as the leading ligueur of Bordeaux.

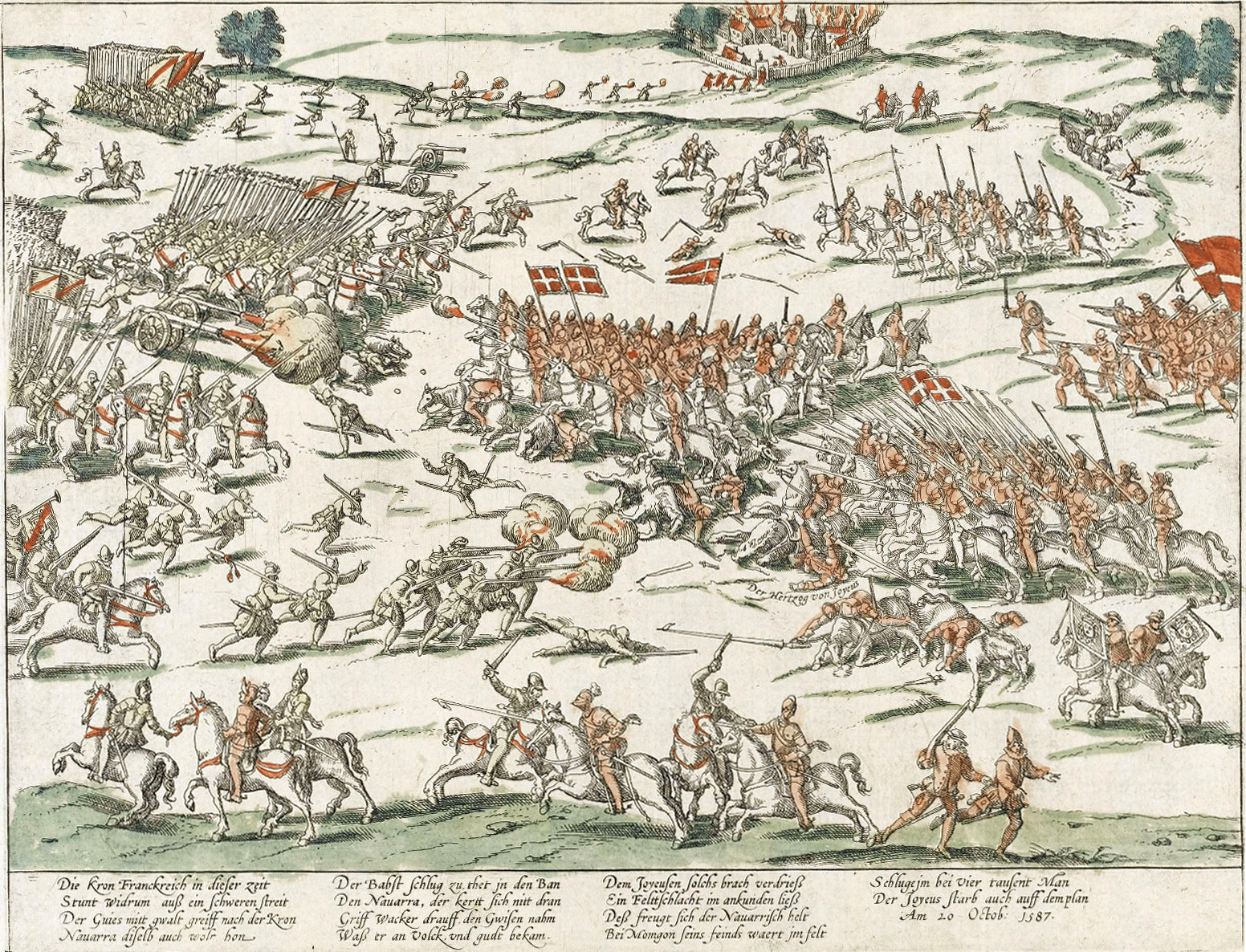
Contemporary illustration of the course of the battle

By 1586, Saint-Luc had given up on trying to write obsequiously to the king to restore their relations as they had existed before, and only communicated with the court through intermediaries, such as Nevers. In his capacity as an enemy of Protestantism he fought for the royalist cause. He participated in the campaign against Navarre under the command of Joyeuse, serving at the Battle of Coutras in October 1587. Saint-Luc commanded a detachment of cavalry from Brouage in the battle. During the battle he and Joyeuse were encircled, and he was taken prisoner.

In October 1588 an Estates General convened at Blois in response to summons from Henri III. Navarre and the Protestants who were at war with the crown could not attend, however Navarre had a council of his own he had been pressured into calling, which convened in La Rochelle on 14 November. The Protestant delegates were not happy with their 'protector', excoriating him for his various transgressions. Among them his provision of ecclesiastical benefices to ligueurs, and his willingness to sell out the Île d'Oléron to Saint-Luc. Navarre for his part protested that his actions were misinterpreted.

== Reign of Henri IV ==
=== True favour ===
With the Assassination of Henri III on 1 August 1589, Saint-Luc was quick to support the Protestant Navarre, now styling himself Henri IV, who he had gone to war to prevent the succession of in 1585. As a reward on 12 August 1590, Henri granted his 10-year-old son survivance to his governate of Brouage. He proved a valuable asset to the king, with Henri appointing him as lieutenant-general of Bretagne putting him in direct conflict with the ligueur duke of Mercœur who looked to rule the province as his personal fief. He fought for the royalists at the sieges of Épernay and Laon. He attended the king's coronation at Chartres where he was allowed to wear Ermine.

=== Fall of Paris ===
Saint-Luc played an important role in the negotiations for the capitulation of ligueur held Paris in 1594. As a brother-in-law to the ligueur governor Brissac he had a good excuse to converse with the governor outside the walls of the city. Explaining his absence as settling a family matter, Brissac met with Saint-Luc on 14 March. Saint-Luc and his wife assured him that if he defected to the royalist camp and brought over the city, Henri would affirm his position as a Marshal of France that had been illegally confirmed on him by the ligueur lieutenant general Mayenne and grant him a reward of over 1,000,000 livres. Having secured Brissac's loyalty, the royalist invasion of the capital was scheduled for 22 March. With the gates opened, columns under Humières, Belin, D'O and Matignon entered the city from various directions, meeting little resistance. Saint-Luc and many other captains met Brissac at the Porte Neuve. Having entrusted the Porte Neuve to a captain, Saint-Luc proceeded with a column of 400 men towards Saint-Thomas-du-Louvre. Soon thereafter Henri was confident the city was passified and entered in triumph.

=== Ascendency and death ===
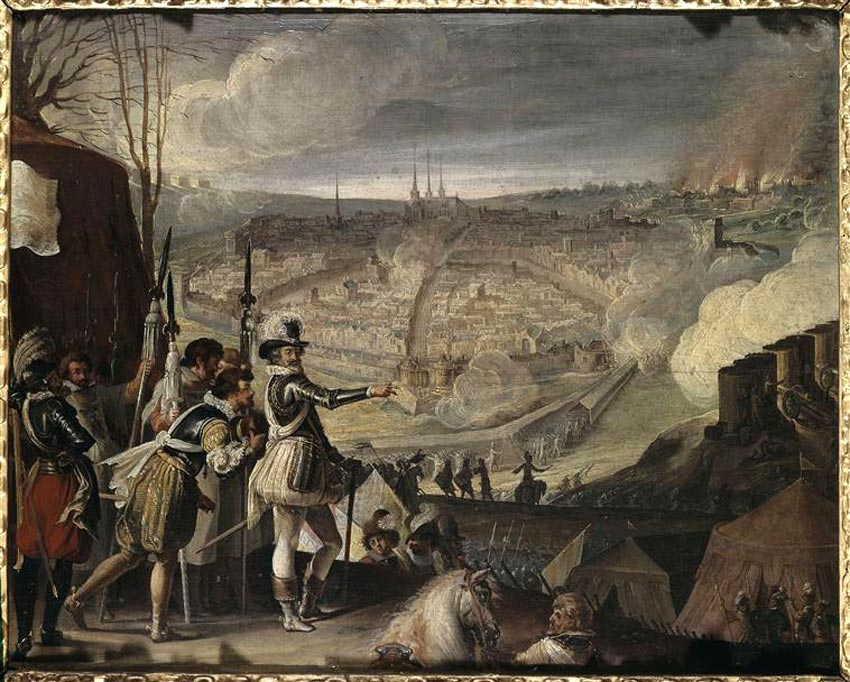
Henri IV at the siege of Amiens where Saint-Luc would die

On 7 January 1596 he was elevated as a chevalier de l'Ordre du Saint-Esprit, the chivalric order at which he had presided with the king during its first intake back in 1579. In April of that year, he was granted the further privilege to be made lieutenant-general of Picardie by Henri. Henri established Saint-Luc as his grand maître de l'artillerie on 5 September 1596, succeeding the recently resigned Philibert de La Guiche to the office.

In the crisis that confronted the king after the Spanish capture of Amiens in 1597, Saint-Luc played an important role in the French recapture of the city. However he would not survive the siege, being killed on 8 September while it was ongoing from a musket shot to his head.

== Sources ==
- d'Aubigné, Agrippa (1995). Thierry, André (ed.). Histoire universelle: 1594-1602 (in French). Librairie Droz S.A.
- Babelon, Jean-Pierre (2009). Henri IV. Fayard.
- Chevallier, Pierre (1985). Henri III: Roi Shakespearien. Fayard.
- Cloulas, Ivan (1979). Catherine de Médicis. Fayard.
- Constant, Jean-Marie (1984). Les Guise. Hachette.
- Constant, Jean-Marie (1996). La Ligue. Fayard.
- Durot, Éric (2012). François de Lorraine, duc de Guise entre Dieu et le Roi. Classiques Garnier.
- Holt, Mack (2002). The Duke of Anjou and the Politique Struggle During the Wars of Religion. Cambridge University Press.
- Jouanna, Arlette (1998). Histoire et Dictionnaire des Guerres de Religion. Bouquins.
- Knecht, Robert (2010). The French Wars of Religion, 1559-1598. Routledge.
- Knecht, Robert (2014). Catherine de' Medici. Routledge.
- Knecht, Robert (2016). Hero or Tyrant? Henry III, King of France, 1574-1589. Routledge.
- Pitts, Vincent (2012). Henri IV of France: His Reign and Age. Johns Hopkins University Press.
- Roberts, Penny (2013). Peace and Authority during the French Religious Wars c.1560-1600. Palgrave Macmillan.
- Le Roux, Nicolas (2000). La Faveur du Roi: Mignons et Courtisans au Temps des Derniers Valois. Champ Vallon.
- Le Roux, Nicolas (2006). Un Régicide au nom de Dieu: L'Assassinat d'Henri III. Gallimard.
- Salmon, J.H.M (1979). Society in Crisis: France during the Sixteenth Century. Metheun & Co.
- Sutherland, Nicola (1980). The Huguenot Struggle for Recognition. Yale University Press.
