= Battle of Coutras =

Battle in the French Wars of Religion

- Part of the War of the Three Henrys
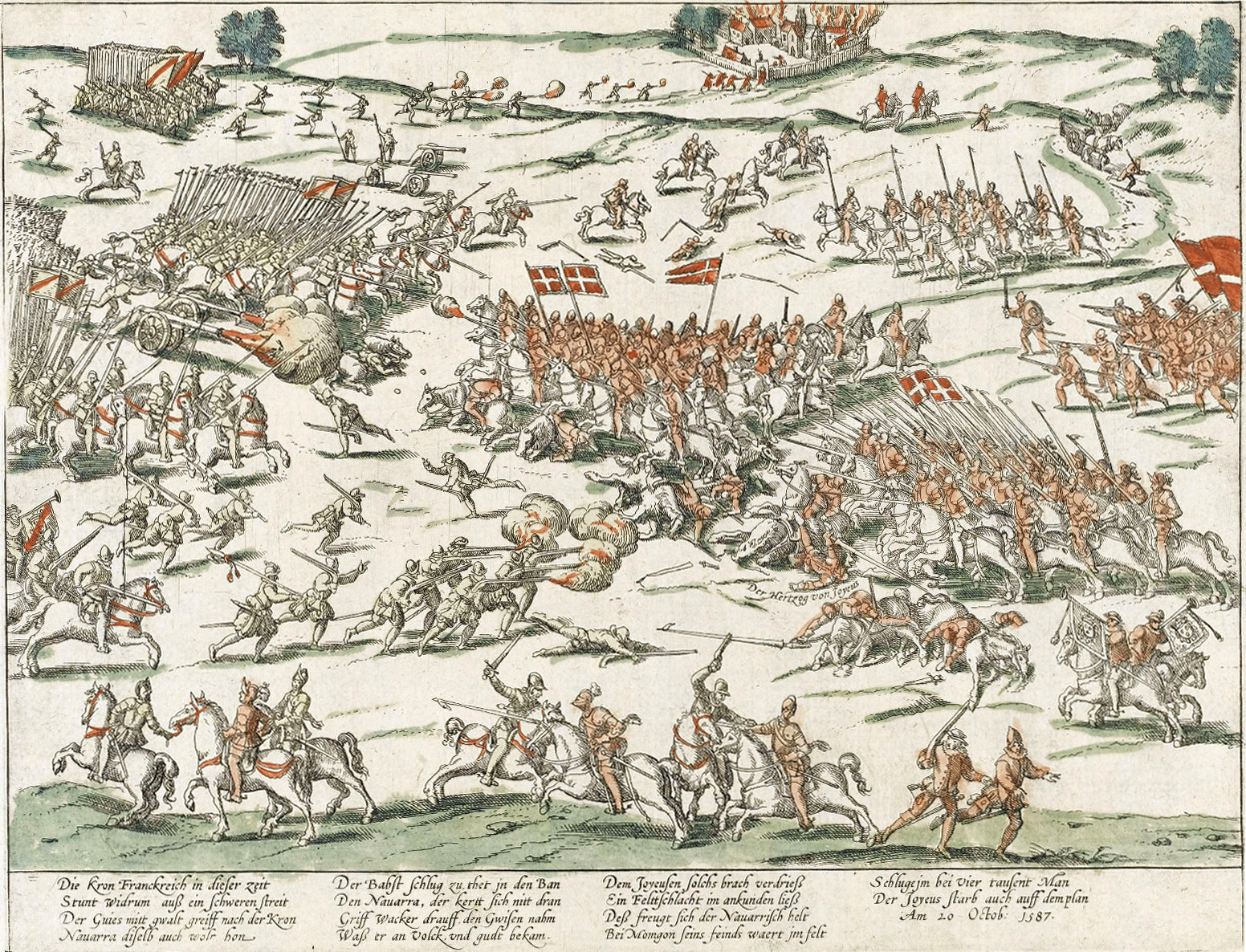
Date	20 October 1587
Location	Coutras (Gironde)
Result	Huguenot victory

Belligerents
Huguenots	Royalist Army

Commanders and leaders
Henry of Navarre	Anne de Joyeuse †

Strength
5,000 infantry 1,800 cavalry	5,000 infantry 1,800 cavalry

Casualties and losses
40 killed	2,000 men, of which 300 nobility

The Battle of Coutras, fought on 20 October 1587, was a major engagement in the French Religious Wars between a Huguenot (Protestant) army under Henry of Navarre (the future Henry IV) and a royalist army led by Anne, Duke of Joyeuse. Henry of Navarre was victorious, and Joyeuse was killed while attempting to surrender.

== Context ==
The French Wars of Religion between the Catholics and Protestants in France had begun in 1562 and continued intermittently thereafter, with temporary periods of nominal peace that were often also marked by violence. King Henry III conducted a conciliatory policy, as reflected in the enactment of the Edict of Beaulieu in 1576 and the Edict of Poitiers the following year. But a new crisis arose in 1584 upon the death of the king's only remaining brother, Francis of Alençon. This made Henry of Navarre, a Protestant, heir presumptive to the throne. The League, led by the Henri I, Duke of Guise, then set the kingdom against the king, who became isolated.

On 18 July 1585, Henry III promulgated an edict canceling all previous edicts, giving precedence "to the Catholics", paying the mercenaries of the League from the Royal Treasury, prohibiting Protestantism in France, and ordering the return of safe Protestant strongholds. Protestants were expelled from power. And while the Guise party won appointments and favours, the king of Navarre was deprived of his functions.

This edict was effectively a declaration of war against the Protestants. Henry of Navarre sought support, initially without success. However, the "privatory bull" (bulle privatoire) by Pope Sixtus V brought him a measure of support from French royalists and Gallican circles; these were joined by the Politiques, supporters of religious tolerance (such as the Governor of Languedoc, Henri de Montmorency, 3rd Duke of Montmorency) and later England and Denmark, in the wake of the assassination of William the Silent and the success of Spain in its fight against the Protestants of the Netherlands.

Faced with the intransigence of Guise, war was inevitable. Joyeuse was sent south with an army, while Philippe Emmanuel, Duke of Mercœur invaded Poitou and blocked Henri I, Prince of Condé at La Rochelle.

== Battle ==
The clash of the two cavalry forces was to the advantage of the King of Navarre. The Duke of Joyeuse launched a charge at full gallop; by the time they came into contact, his horses were exhausted, and his squadrons of gendarmes had lost cohesion, rendering them ineffective. For his part, Henry of Navarre adopted an innovative tactic in the disposition of his troops: he inserted platoons of musketeers (five men abreast) within his reiter squadrons, to support them with firepower. The charge of the Protestant pistolier cavalry broke the Royalist heavy lancers, and their army was routed. The Duke of Joyeuse was defeated, captured, and killed by a pistol shot. 2,000 Catholics were also captured along with Anne's younger brother, Claude Joyeuse (1569–1587), lord of Saint-Sauveur and Jacques d'Amboise, the eldest of the branch of Amboise-d'Aubijoux.

Victory went to the Protestants, led by Henry of Navarre. He recovered the body of Joyeuse and attended a mass in honour of his slain enemies.

== See also ==
- French Wars of Religion

== Bibliography ==
- Pierre Miquel, Les Guerres de religion, Club France Loisirs, 1980 (ISBN 978-2-7242-0785-9), pp. 342–344.
- Pierre de Vayssiére, Messieurs de Joyeuse (1560–1615 ), Paris, Albin Michel, 1926.
- There is a detailed account of the battle in Garrett Mattingly's The Armada.
