= Penitential procession =

A penitential procession is a form of public prayer in the Catholic Church, often led by clergy, held in times of crisis such as plague, famine, natural disaster or war. Later these were often held more regularly at penitential times of the year, such as Holy Week. These processions involve the faithful walking in solemnity.

In times of calamity litanies were held, in which the people walked in robes of penitence, fasting, barefooted, and, in later times, frequently dressed in black (litaniae nigrae). The cross was carried at the head of the procession and often the gospel and the relics of the saint were carried. Gregory of Tours gives numerous instances of such litanies in time of calamity; thus he describes a procession of the clergy and people round the city, in which relics of St Remigius were carried and litanies chanted in order to avert the plague. So, too, Gregory the Great writes to the Sicilian bishops to hold processions to prevent a threatened invasion of Sicily.

A famous instance of these penitential litanies is the litania septiformis ordered by Gregory the Great in the year 590, when Rome had been inundated and pestilence had followed. In this litany seven processions, of clergy, laymen, monks, nuns, matrons, the poor, and children respectively, starting from seven different churches, proceeded to hear mass at St. Maria Maggiore. This litany has often been confused with the litania major, introduced at Rome in 598 (vide supra), but is quite distinct from it.

At the litaniae majores and minores and other penitential processions, joyful hymns are not allowed, but the litanies are sung, and, if the length of the procession requires, the penitential and gradual psalms. As to the discipline regarding processions the bishop, according to the Council of Trent (Sess. 25 de reg. cap. 6), appoints and regulates processions and public prayers outside the churches.
