= Louis Joseph, Duke of Guise =

Duke Of Guise

Louis Joseph de Lorraine
- Prince of Joinville; Duke of Joyeuse
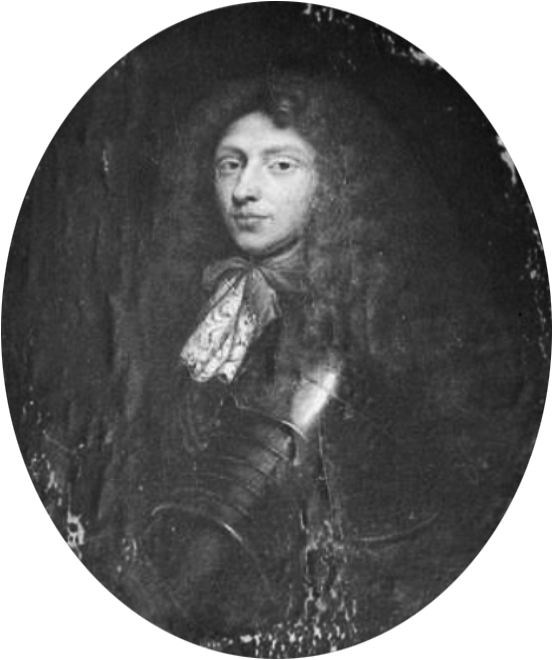
- Portrait de Louis-Joseph de Lorraine, duc de Guise et d'Alençon - Hôtel-Dieu

Duke of Guise
- Tenure: 2 June 1664 - 30 July 1671
- Predecessor: Henry II
- Successor: François Joseph
- Born: 7 August 1650
- Died: 30 July 1671 (aged 20); Hôtel de Guise
- Spouse: Élisabeth Marguerite d'Orléans
- Issue: François Joseph, Duke of Guise
- House: Guise
- Father: Louis, Duke of Joyeuse
- Mother: Marie Françoise de Valois

Louis Joseph de Lorraine Duke of Guise and Duke of Angoulême, (7 August 1650 – 30 July 1671) was the only son of Louis, Duke of Joyeuse and Marie Françoise de Valois, the only daughter of Louis-Emmanuel d'Angoulême, Count of Alès, Governor of Provence and son of Charles de Valois Duke of Angoulême, a bastard of Charles IX of France.

== Biography ==
Coat of Arms of the Dukes of Guise

He was born at the Hôtel de Guise, present Hôtel de Soubise.

As his mother had been confined to the abbey of Essay for "imbecility" (that is, mental illness), Louis Joseph was raised by his aunt and legal guardian, Marie de Lorraine, known as "Mademoiselle de Guise." Upon the death of his uncle Henry II, Duke of Guise, Louis Joseph succeeded him as head of the House of Guise and duke. Mlle de Guise promptly ordered extensive renovations to the family's stately residence, known as the "Hôtel de Guise."

In October 1663, a year before he succeeded as duke, Louis Joseph and his aunt were received in great pomp in his duchy of Joinville. He received an excellent education, under the guidance of Mlle de Guise's protégé, Philippe Goibaut, and his skills as a horseman were honed by François Roger de Gaignières, his écuyer.

On 15 June 1667, the young Duke married Élisabeth Marguerite d'Orléans, duchesse d'Alençon, daughter of Gaston, Duke of Orléans, at Saint-Germain-en-Laye. As she was a petite-fille de France, the marriage was considered a coup for the House of Guise, for the bridegroom was a mere prince étranger: Saint-Simon noted that she was a stickler for receiving the honours due to her rank, even at the expense of her husband's dignity at the court of Louis XIV, inasmuch as he "was only entitled to a folding stool." Mademoiselle de Guise carefully trained her nephew to receive Italian nobles and ambassadors who were passing through Paris, and it doubtlessly was in order to add additional lustre to the couple's little court that Mlle de Guise invited Marc-Antoine Charpentier to move into an apartment at the Hôtel de Guise and compose for the young couple's chapel.

The couple had one son:

- Francis Joseph de Lorraine, Duke of Alençon (1670–1675)

The young Duke was winning the approval of Louis XIV and was given the honour of being at the King's side in military reviews, but then disaster struck. Whilst returning from a visit to the court of Charles II, king of England, he fell ill with smallpox on 18 July 1671, and died twelve days later.

The music for his funeral was composed by Marc-Antoine Charpentier. His body was carried to Joinville to be buried near his ancestors, and his heart was buried at the abbey of Montmartre.

== Notes ==
French nobility
Preceded by Louis, Duke of Joyeuse	Count of Eu; 1654–1660	Succeeded by Anne, Duchess of Montpensier
Preceded by Louis, Duke of Joyeuse	Duke of Joyeuse; 1654–1671	Succeeded by Francis Joseph, Duke of Guise
Preceded by Henry II, Duke of Guise	Duke of Guise; Prince of Joinville; 1664–1671	Succeeded by Francis Joseph, Duke of Guise
