= Élisabeth Marguerite d'Orléans =

Isabelle d'Orléans
- Duchess of Guise
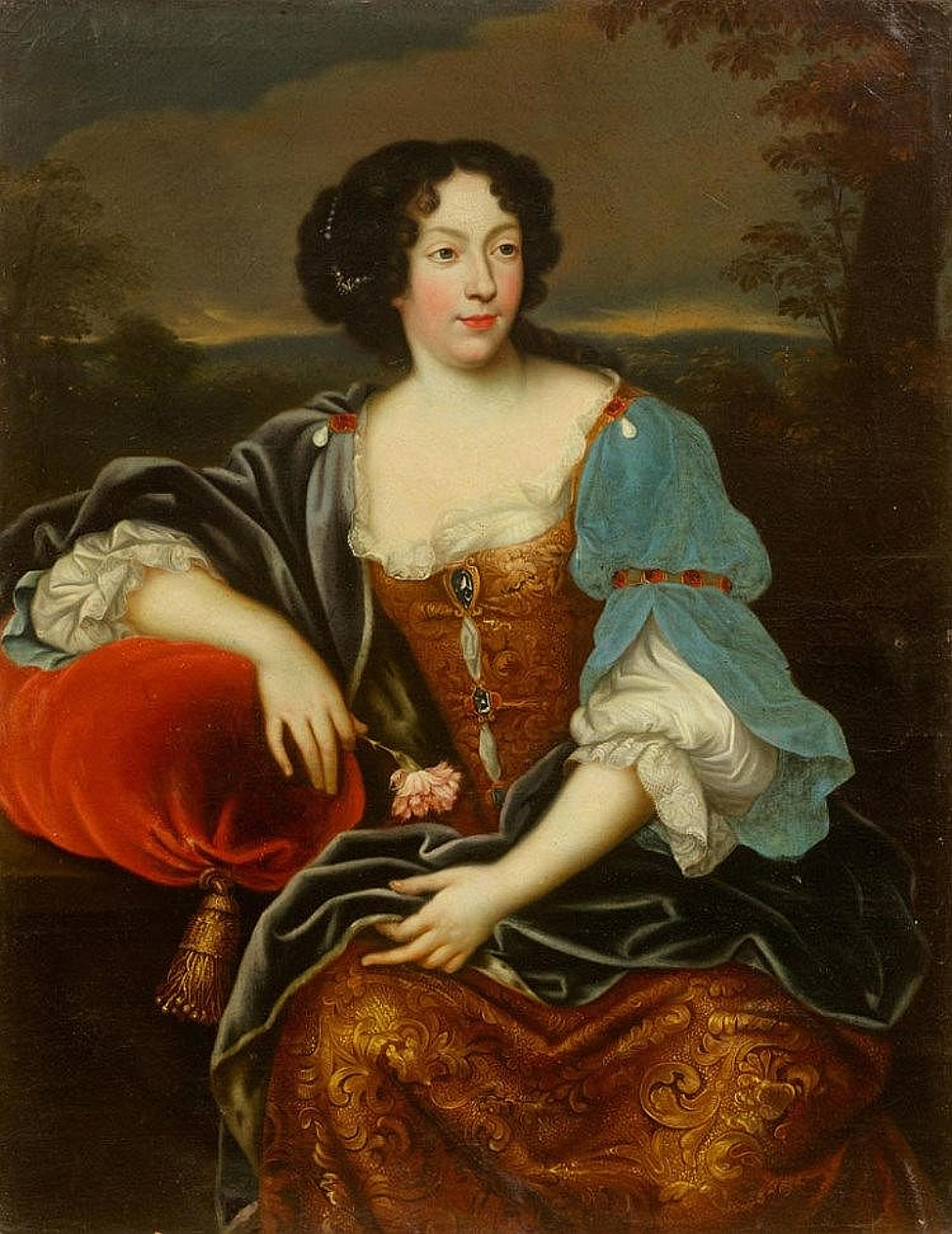
- Portrait by Pierre Mignard
- Born: 26 December 1646; Palais du Luxembourg, Paris, France
- Died: 17 March 1696 (aged 49); Palace of Versailles, France
- Burial: Carmel of the Faubourg Saint-Jacques, Paris
- Spouse: Louis Joseph, Duke of Guise
- Issue: Francis Joseph, Duke of Guise
Names
- Élisabeth Marguerite d'Orléans
- House: Orléans
- Father: Gaston, Duke of Orléans
- Mother: Marguerite of Lorraine

Élisabeth Marguerite d'Orléans (26 December 1646 – 17 March 1696), known as Isabelle d'Orléans, was the Duchess of Alençon and, during her husband's lifetime, Duchess of Angoulême. She was a granddaughter of Henry IV of France, and first cousin of Louis XIV, being the daughter of Gaston d'Orléans and Marguerite of Lorraine. She was suo jure Duchess of Alençon and Angoulême.

== Life ==
Élisabeth d'Orléans was born in Paris at the Luxembourg Palace, then called the Palais d'Orléans, and now the seat of the Senate of France. The palace had been given to her father on the death of his mother, Marie de' Medici in 1642. Élisabeth was known by her first name, Élisabeth, but she always signed Isabelle. One of five children, she was not raised with her siblings but in a convent, because she was destined to become abbess of Remiremont and was styled as such.

=== Marriage ===
Known as Mademoiselle d'Alençon until her marriage, Isabelle (Élisabeth Marguerite) was acquainted with the young Louise Françoise de La Baume Le Blanc, who was to become duchesse de La Vallière, mistress of Louis XIV, and who grew up at Blois in the entourage of Isabelle's sister Marguerite Louise d'Orléans. It was assumed that Isabelle's older and more beautiful sister, Marguerite Louise, would marry Louis, and that Françoise Madeleine would marry another European prince. A possible match was one with Charles Emmanuel II, Duke of Savoy, who later married her younger sister on 4 March 1663.

Another possible spouse was her cousin Henri Jules de Bourbon - the future Prince de Condé and Prince du Sang. This was dropped as Henri Jules preferred the German Anne Henriette of Bavaria who was a granddaughter of the Queen of Bohemia.

The choice for Isabelle (who was humpbacked) fell upon a "foreign prince (prince étranger) naturalized in France": Louis Joseph de Guise. The Duke of Guise was the titular head of the House of Guise, a cadet branch of the House of Lorraine of which Isabelle's mother was a member.

Isabelle and the Duke were married at the Château de Saint-Germain-en-Laye on 15 May 1667 in the presence of the Court and the Princes of the Blood. Her husband, four years younger than she was, was not only under the legal control of his aunt and guardian, the "magnificent" and proud Mademoiselle de Guise (Marie de Lorraine de Guise), but in day-to-day protocol, he was treated by Isabelle as the social inferior that he was. From her marriage to her death, Isabelle d'Orléans was known to the French as Madame de Guise. Her brief union with the Duke of Guise produced one child:

- Francis Joseph de Lorraine, Duke of Guise (Hôtel de Guise, Luxembourg Palace, Paris, 28 August 1670 – 16 March 1675).

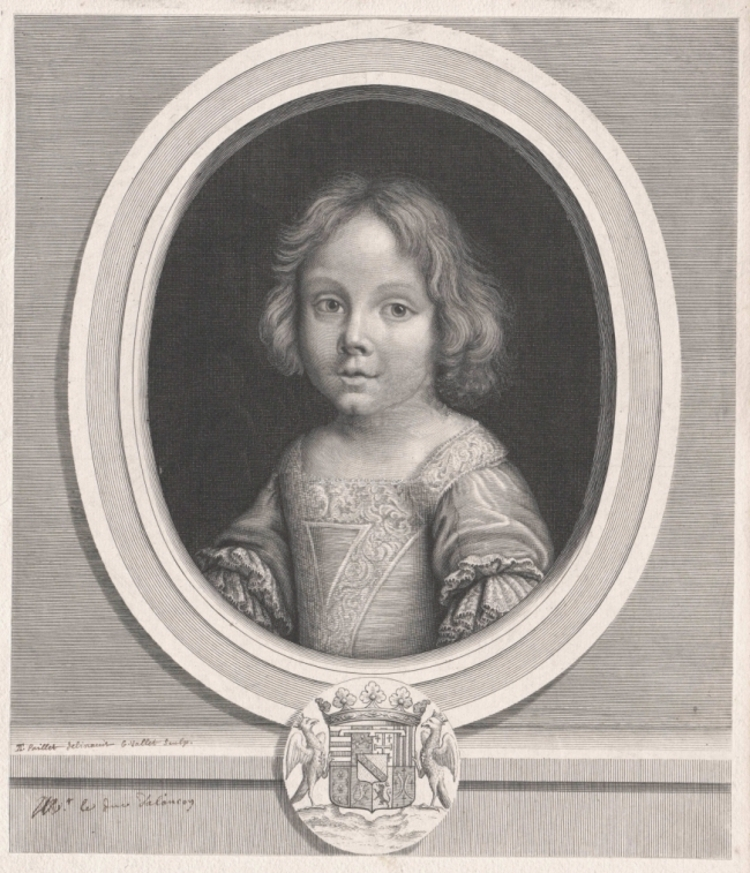
An engraving of Francis Joseph de Lorraine when he was Duke of Guise.

=== Widowhood ===
Isabelle's husband died in 1671, from smallpox contacted on his way back from a visit to the court of King Charles II of England. Her son inherited his father's titles: duc de Guise et de Joyeuse and prince de Joinville.

At the death of her mother in 1672, she moved into the Luxembourg Palace along with the little Francis Joseph. Still unable to walk unaided at age four, he was dropped by his nurse and died from a head injury in 1675. He died at the Luxembourg Palace. Upon her son's death, she became the Duchess of Alençon and Angoulême in her own right.

After the death of her son, Isabelle (whom the French knew as "Madame de Guise") spent every summer in her duchy of Alençon and most winters at the royal court. When in Paris, she would stay at the Luxembourg Palace which had been ceded to her after her mother's death in 1672. (Haunted by her little son's death throes there, she found it difficult to stay very long at the Luxembourg.) In 1672 she created a private apartment for herself at the abbey of Saint Pierre de Montmartre, where she often saw Mlle de Guise and her sister, the abbess. After 1675, this little circle expanded when Isabelle's sister Marguerite Louise, Grand Duchess of Tuscany, left her husband, moved into an apartment within the abbey walls, and was kept under what amounted to house arrest. Always very devout, Isabelle commissioned religious pieces from Marc-Antoine Charpentier, the composer of Mlle de Guise. She also commissioned secular works (operas and pastorales) from him, some of which were performed at the royal court.

Isabelle was a fervent supporter of her cousin Louis XIV's policies to bring Huguenots back into the Catholic fold. As early as November 1676, when she supervised the conversion of a Protestant lady, Isabelle commissioned from Marc-Antoine Charpentier the first of a succession of oratorios that recounted how St. Cecilia had won over her bridegroom and his brother to Christianity. The probable author of the libretti was Philippe Goibaut, a protégé of the two Guise women. After the Revocation of the Edict of Nantes in October 1685, she created a house for "New Converts" in her duchy of Alençon and actively converted the local Huguenots.

In 1694, she gave the Luxembourg Palace to Louis XIV. She died in 1696 at the Palace of Versailles and was buried in the Great Carmel of Paris, among the nuns.

The fortune that she had accumulated was willed to her older and only surviving sibling, Marguerite Louise, Grand Duchess of Tuscany.

== Ancestors ==
Ancestors of Élisabeth Marguerite d'Orléans

8. Antoine of Navarre
4. Henry IV of France
9. Jeanne III of Navarre
2. Gaston, Duke of Orléans
10. Francesco I de' Medici, Grand Duke of Tuscany
5. Marie de' Medici
11. Joanna of Austria
1. Élisabeth Marguerite d'Orléans
12. Charles III, Duke of Lorraine
6. Francis II, Duke of Lorraine
13. Claude of Valois
3. Marguerite of Lorraine
14. Paul, Count of Salm-Brandebourg
7. Christina of Salm
15. Marie Le Veneur de Tillières
