= Marie de Lorraine, Duchess of Guise =

Marie
- Princess of Joinville
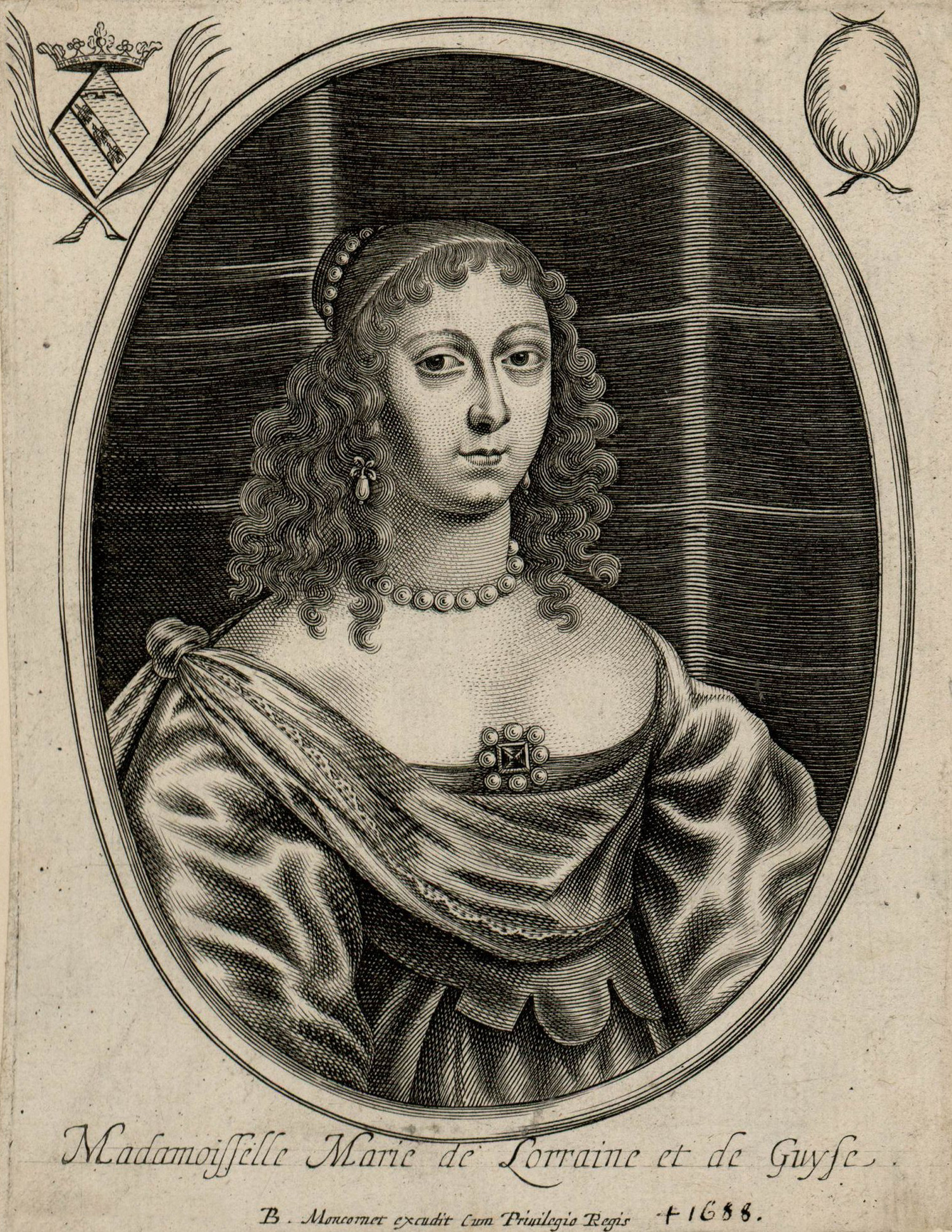
- Engraving by Balthasar Moncornet, 1656

Duchess of Guise
- Tenure: 16 March 1675 - 3 March 1688
- Predecessor: François Joseph
- Successor: Henri Jules
- Born: 15 August 1615; Hôtel de Guise, Paris, France
- Died: 3 March 1688 (aged 72); Hôtel de Guise, Paris, France
Names
- Marie de Lorraine
- House: Guise
- Father: Charles de Lorraine
- Mother: Henriette Catherine de Joyeuse

Marie de Lorraine (15 August 1615 – 3 March 1688) was the daughter of Charles de Lorraine, Duke of Guise and Henriette Catherine de Joyeuse and the last member of the House of Guise, a branch of the House of Lorraine.

== Biography ==
Marie de Lorraine de Guise was a "foreign princess naturalized in France" (that is, the daughter of a foreign prince of a junior branch of the House of Lorraine). After the death of the last male of the House of Guise in 1675, Marie became duchess of Guise, duchess of Joyeuse, and princess of Joinville and enjoyed the vast revenues from these duchies and principalities. People addressed her formally as "Your Highness"; she signed legal documents as "Marie de Lorraine"; and after 1675, as "Marie de Lorraine de Guise", but she ended personal letters with "Guise".

Exiled to Florence with her family, 1634–43, Marie (whom the French knew as "Mademoiselle de Guise") became close to the Medicis and came to love Italy and especially Italian music. For over forty years scarcely a week passed that she did not write to her Medici acquaintances in Florence, or receive word from them through the Tuscan resident in Paris. In c. 1650, she morganatically married Claude de Bourdeille, comte de Montrésor by whom she had several children whose existence was never acknowledged publicly but whom she occasionally threatened to acknowledge if she did not get her way.

As guardian for her nephew, Louis Joseph, Duke of Guise, she was preoccupied with returning the House of Guise to its former glory. This meant giving the young man a fine residence and a prestigious bride. In 1666 Marie therefore commissioned Jacques Gabriel (the father of royal architect Jacques Gabriel) to carry out extensive renovations for the family's urban residence, known as the Hôtel de Guise. She also ordered a total reworking of the garden by the famous garden designer, André Le Nôtre. The old stable wing that stretched along the garden was also renovated and subdivided into comfortable apartments to be occupied by what might be likened to today's artists and intellectuals in residence: Philippe Goibaut, Roger de Gaignières, and, a bit later, Marc-Antoine Charpentier.

For a bride, Marie de Lorraine aimed for someone with high social standing: Elisabeth d'Orléans, Louis XIV's first cousin. The marriage was celebrated on 5 May 1667. The newlyweds settled down into their apartment on the noble floor of the Hôtel de Guise and Marie de Lorraine lodged in her ground-floor apartment just below them.

Starting in 1670, Marc-Antoine Charpentier began composing for the three Guises, sometimes singing haute-contre lines. Mlle de Guise protected him and advanced his career by soliciting commissions from people or establishments who were seeking her continued patronage. Indeed, for eighteen years her patronage fostered a number of major works, most of them devotional and strongly influenced by Italian music. For example, she was probably one of the "enraged virgins" and "heroines" who swooped down on Molière in late 1672 and forced him to give Charpentier the chance to write the music for Molière's the forthcoming theatrical spectacle, the Malade Imaginaire.

In 1671 her nephew Louis Joseph, Duke of Guise died. She and his young widow argued over who would be guardian of the late Duke's young son, François Joseph, the last male of the House of Guise. Marie won, but her guardianship was short-lived. The young duke died in 1675.

Henceforth, as the last member of the House of Guise, she used her vast wealth not only to live splendidly but for projects dear to her heart. In a cartouche beneath her portrait by Mignard, above, a solitary tree stands in a forest of stumps, to indicate her position as last survivor. A Latin motto makes the parallel explicit: Succisas dat conjectare superstes, "The survivor bears witness to the fallen."

After these two closely spaced deaths, Marie turned to religion. With the help of Father Nicolas Barré, Minim, she founded a teachers' training institute and founded schools for girls and hospitals for the poor in her Parisian parish and in her provincial lands. In her vast Parisian residence known as the "Hôtel de Guise," she presided "magnificently" over a select small "court" composed chiefly of members of the House of Lorraine, clergy, learned protégés, and Italians passing through Paris. Music (often Italian and Italian-style music) was the principal entertainment at these events.

Although her relations were often frosty with Louis Joseph's widow, known to her contemporaries as "Madame de Guise", the two women continued to see one another, both in Paris and at the abbey of Saint Pierre de Montmartre, where Marie's sister Renée was abbess and where Élisabeth's sister, Marguerite Louise d'Orléans, the erstwhile Grand Duchess of Tuscany, resided after 1675. Both Guise women had private apartments at Montmartre.

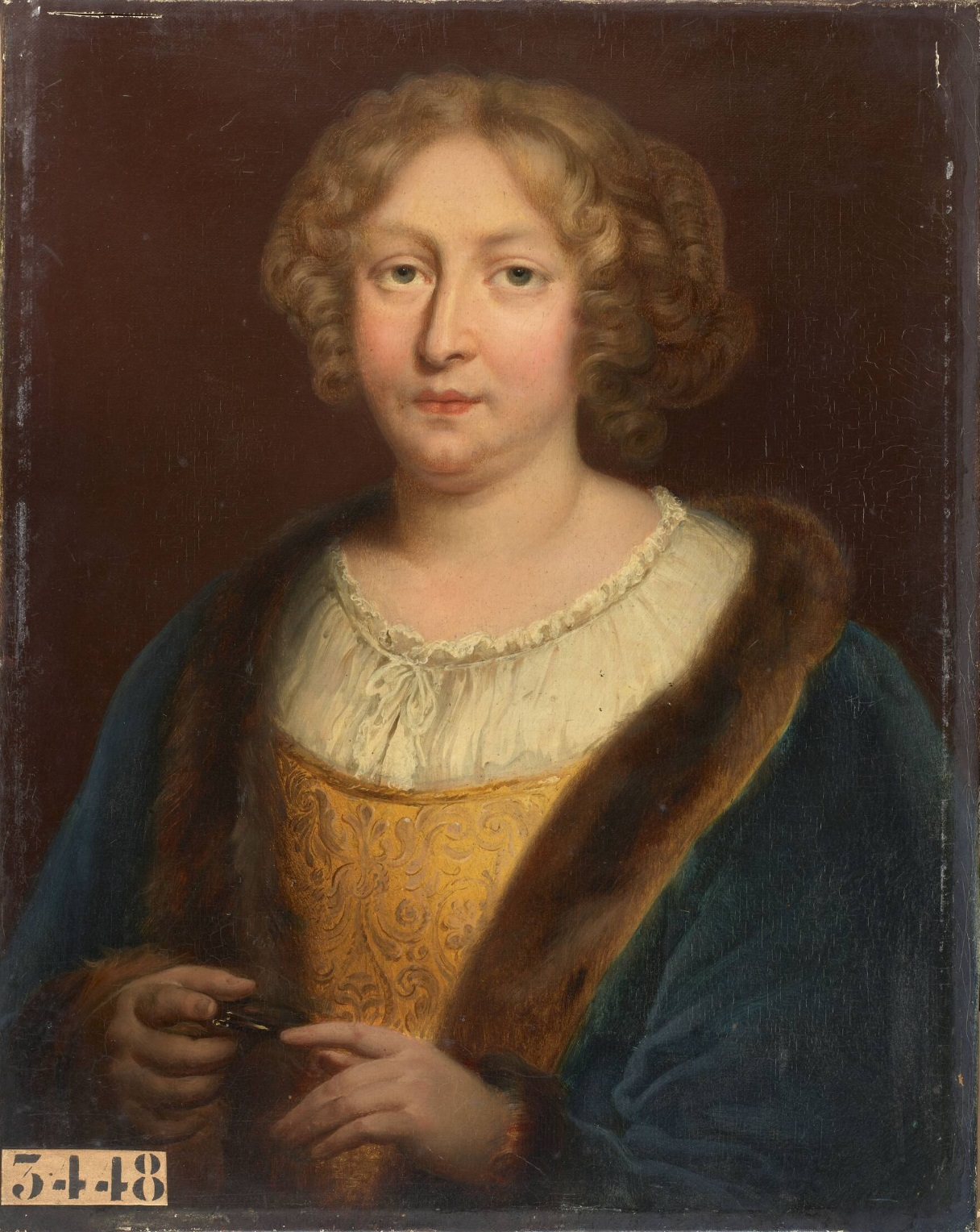
Painting done by Louis-Edouard Rioult (c. 1839)

In the early 1670s, Marie had begun to assemble a small ensemble of household musicians to perform pieces by a variety of French and Italian composers, among them Marc-Antoine Charpentier. Then, in the early 1680s she enlarged the group, until it rivaled both in size and quality the ensembles maintained by several sovereigns. Over the years she made her composer and her musicians available to her nephew's widow, Mme de Guise, for performances in churches and at the royal court.

In a will intended to disinherit her niece, la Grande Mademoiselle (that is, Anne Marie Louise d'Orléans, Duchess of Montpensier) Marie de Lorraine gave the Hôtel de Guise to Charles François de Stainville, count of Couvonges, in 1688. Pressure exerted by her heirs caused the will to be broken by the Parlement of Paris in 1689.

In 1700, the Hôtel de Guise was sold to François, Prince of Soubise and his wife Anne de Rohan-Chabot and became the Hôtel de Soubise. Only a few fragments of the Hôtel de Guise survive within the vast buildings and gardens of the Hôtel de Soubise, which currently houses the Archives nationales.

== Notes ==
French nobility
Preceded by Francis Joseph, Duke of Guise	Duchess of Guise; 1675 – 1688	Succeeded by Henri Jules, Prince of Condé
Preceded by Francis Joseph, Duke of Guise	Duchess of Joyeuse; 1675 – 1688	Succeeded by Charles, Prince of Commercy
Preceded by Francis Joseph, Duke of Guise	Princess of Joinville; 1675 – 1688	Succeeded by Anne Marie Louise, Duchess of Montpensier
