= Typus Religionis =

Religious painting

The painting Typus Religionis (Model of Religion) was created by an unknown artist in the late sixteenth or earlier seventeenth century, most likely in the Netherlands.

Typus Religionis (Model of Religion) is a large allegorical painting that depicts a galleon ship as a representation of faith. Also called "Allegory of the Society of Jesus", it is currently on display in the Hotel de Soubise in Paris. The work was created as a black and white print from two massive copperplates (measuring approximately 2 by 3 feet), and this impression was then printed onto canvas, brightly colored, varnished, and mounted, making the final object look more like an oil painting than a print. The original artist and the exact year of creation is unknown.

The government of France confiscated the work from the Jesuit College in Billom in 1762 as evidence in a trial of the Billom Jesuits. Of particular importance in the criticism of the painting is its depiction of the Pope and King Henri IV of France being pulled behind the main ship of faith in what is often called the secular ship, suggesting that they rely on Jesuits for a path to salvation. The painting was instrumental in the trial, which led to the expulsion of the Jesuits from France. The prosecution claimed that the painting was blasphemous and showed a lack of respect for the papacy and monarchy, evidence of the Jesuits' arrogance and potential threat to the church and nation.

The large painting measures approximately 3 metres by 1.8 metres (10 by 20 feet). The main ship of faith has many Christian figures on it, with St. Ignatius of Loyola, a co-founder of the Jesuit order, at the centre. Other religious orders are also represented on the ship by St. Francis of Assisi (Order of Friars Minor), St. Bruno of Cologne (Order of Carthusians), St. Dominc (Order of Preachers), St. Basil (Eastern monasticism), and St. Anthony (Western monasticism). The ship of faith in the centre of the painting sails toward a golden port of salvation on the left, floating above a sea of sins. Some people on the ship throw rocks at boat full of demons (lower left) and resist attacks from heretics (lower right). As the ship sails, it collects souls and guides other smaller vessels toward the port of salvation.
