= François Joseph, Duke of Guise =

François Joseph de Lorraine
- Prince of Joinville
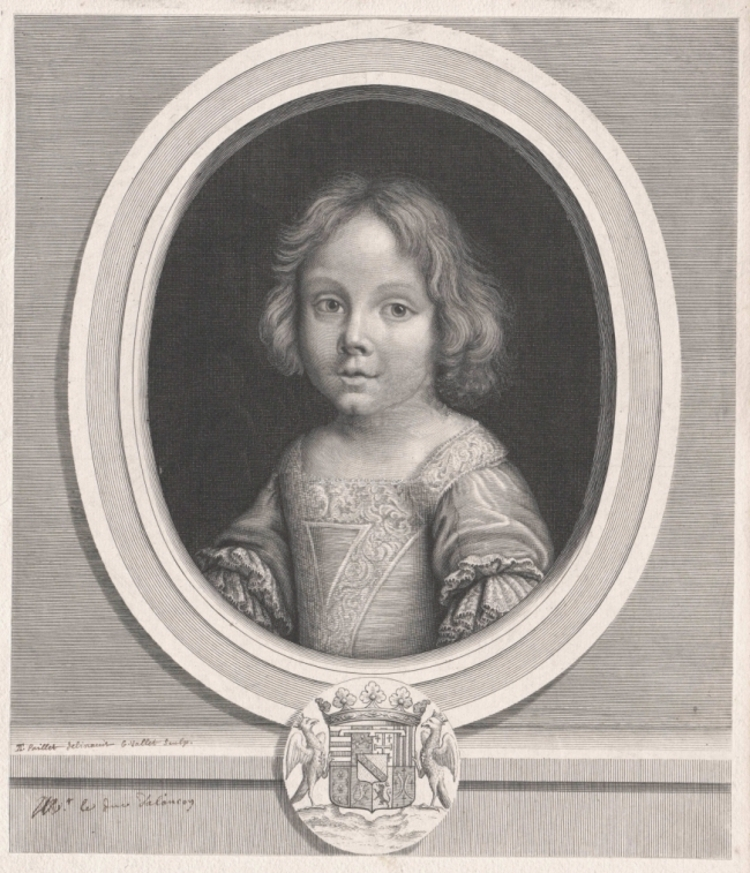
- An engraving from when he was Duke of Guise.

Duke of Guise
- Tenure: 30 July 1671 - 16 March 1675
- Predecessor: Louis Joseph
- Successor: Marie
- Born: 28 August 1670; Hôtel de Soubise
- Died: 16 March 1675 (aged 4); Luxembourg Palace, Paris
- House: Guise
- Father: Louis Joseph, Duke of Guise
- Mother: Élisabeth Marguerite d'Orléans

François Joseph de Lorraine (28 August 1670 – 16 March 1675), Duke of Guise, Duke of Alençon and Duke of Angoulême, was the only son of Louis Joseph, Duke of Guise and Élisabeth Marguerite d'Orléans, suo jure duchess of Alençon.

== Biography ==
Born at the Hôtel de Soubise in Paris to the daughter of Gaston d'Orléans and the head of the Princely House of Guise, Francis Joseph would be their only child. He was a first cousin of the last Medici Grand Duke of Tuscany Gian Gastone de' Medici; he was also of second cousin of Louis XIV and nephew of the famous La Grande Mademoiselle.

Upon the premature death of his father in 1671, he became Duke of Guise and Joyeuse, but was styled the Duke of Alençon, by right of his mother, or jure matris.

At the death of his maternal grandmother Marguerite of Lorraine in 1672 Francis Joseph and his mother moved into the Luxembourg Palace in Paris.

The last male of the senior line of the House of Guise, he was sickly and lived in "misery". Still unable to walk unaided at age four, he was dropped by his nurse and died from a head injury in 1675 at Luxembourg Palace. He was succeeded by his great-aunt Marie de Lorraine.

French nobility
Preceded by Louis Joseph de Lorraine	Duke of Guise and Joyeuse; Prince of Joinville; 1671–1675	Succeeded by Marie de Lorraine
