= Hôtel de Soubise =

Private mansion in the 3rd arrondissement of Paris

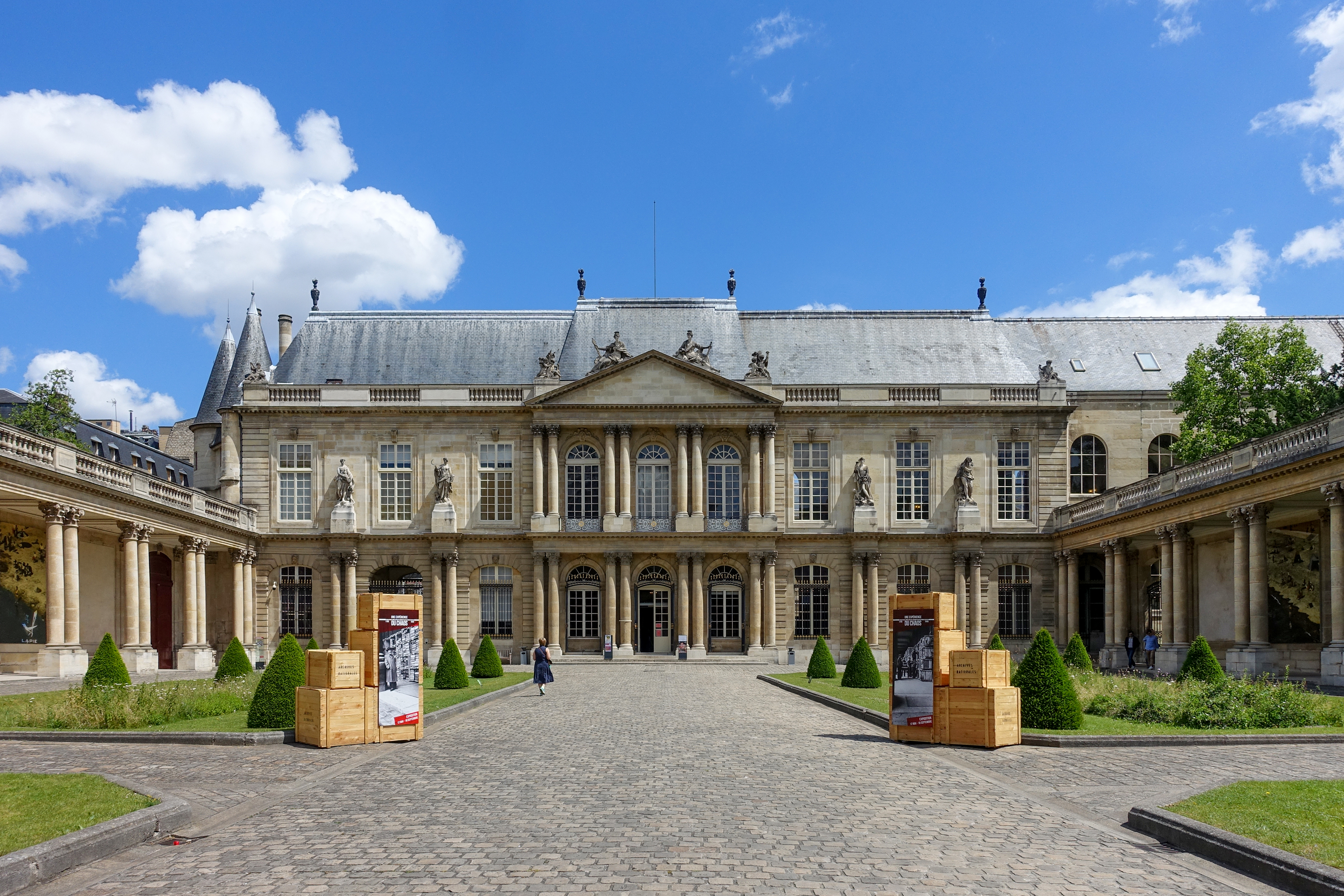
- The corps de logis
- Interactive map of the Hôtel de Soubise area

General information
- Type: Hôtel particulier
- Architectural style: Baroque (exterior); Rococo (interior)
- Location: 3rd arrondissement of Paris, France
- Current tenants: Archives nationales
- Owner: French state

The Hôtel de Soubise (French pronunciation: [otɛl d(ə) subiz]) is a city mansion entre cour et jardin. It is located at 60 Rue des Francs-Bourgeois in the 3rd arrondissement of Paris, France.

== History ==
The Hôtel de Soubise was built as an hôtel particulier for the Prince and Princess de Soubise on the site of a semi-fortified manor house named the Grand-Chantier built in 1375 for connétable Olivier de Clisson, that had formerly been a property of the Templars. The site previously contained the Hôtel de Guise, the Paris residence of the Dukes of Guise, a cadet branch (junior line) of the House of Lorraine. It was the birthplace of the last Duke, Francis Joseph, Duke of Guise, the son of Élisabeth Marguerite d'Orléans, Duchess of Alençon. He died in 1675 and the Guise estate passed to Marie de Lorraine who died at the Hôtel in 1688 having been born there in 1615.

On March 27, 1700, François de Rohan, prince de Soubise bought the Hôtel de Clisson, lately de Guise, and asked the architect Pierre-Alexis Delamair to remodel it completely. Works started in 1704. His wife Anne de Rohan-Chabot, at one time mistress of Louis XIV (their affair is thought to have funded the purchase of the building), died here in 1709.

Hercule Mériadec, Prince of Soubise (son of François) was responsible for some interior décor at the Hôtel de Soubise engaging Germain Boffrand in the process. This dates from the 1730s. Improvements were made to celebrate the marriage of Hercule Mériadec to Marie Sophie de Courcillon, granddaughter of the marquis de Dangeau.

It was the home of Louis XV's friend Charles de Rohan, prince de Soubise; his daughter Charlotte Élisabeth Godefride de Rohan, future princesse de Condé was born here in 1737 as was the Princess of Guéméné in 1743.

Interiors by Germain Boffrand, created between 1735–40 and partly dismantled, figure among the high points of the rococo style in France (Kimball 1943: 178). They constituted the new apartments of the Prince on the ground floor and the Princesse on the piano nobile, both of which featured oval salons looking into the garden. These rooms have changed very little since the 18th century, including the Chambre du prince, Salon ovale du prince, Chambre d'apparat de la princesse and the very fine Salon ovale de la princesse with gilded carvings and mirror-glass embedded in the boiserie and ceiling canvases and overdoors by François Boucher, Charles-Joseph Natoire, and Carle Van Loo.

Since a Napoleonic decree of 1808, this residence has been the property of the State. Nowadays it hosts the Musée des Archives Nationales and a part of the French National Archives.

The building and forecourt also served as a filming location "stand-in" for the Elysee Palace in the 1973 film Day of the Jackal.

== Gallery ==
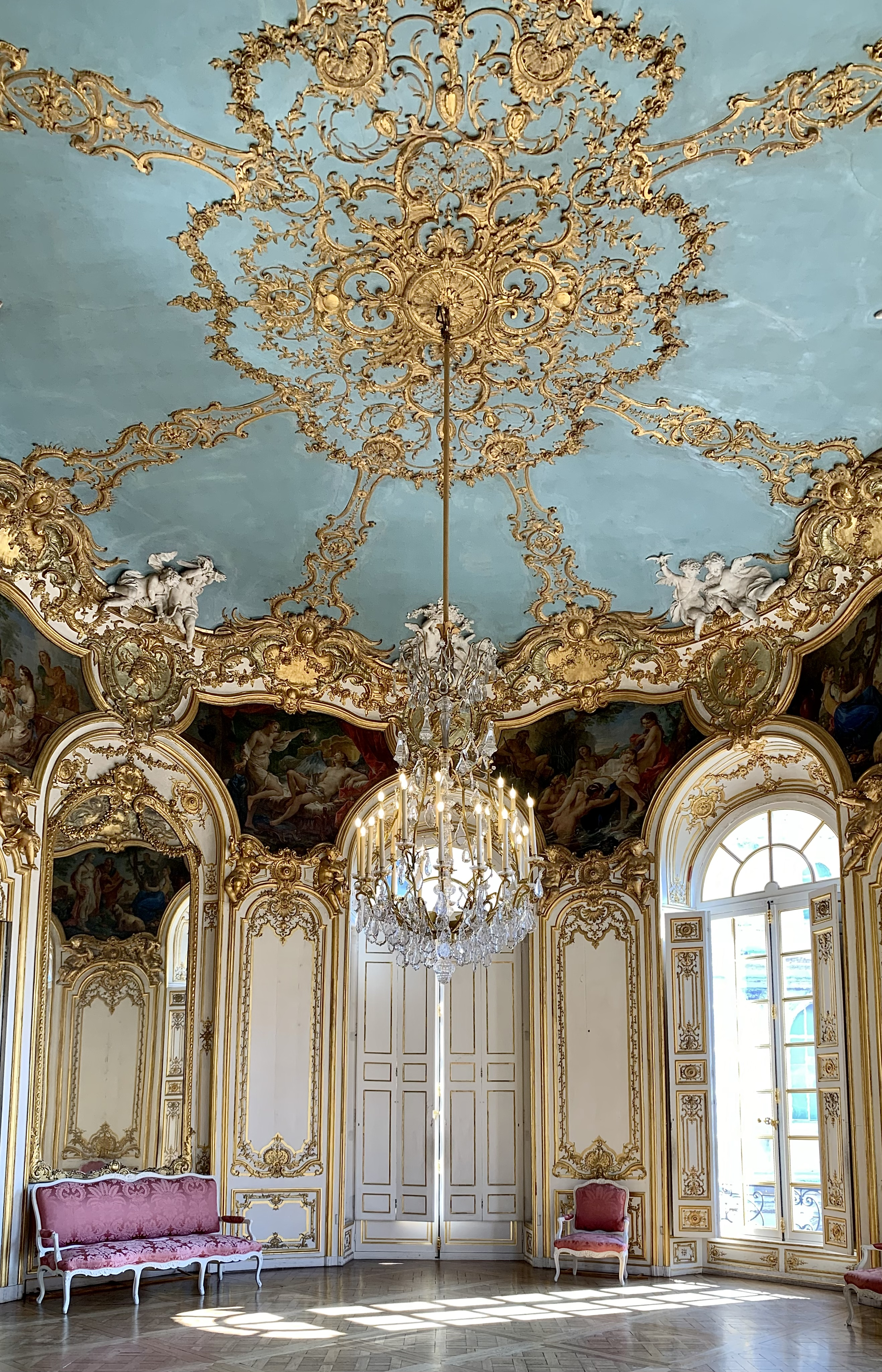
The Salon ovale de la princesse, by Germain Boffrand, with paintings by Charles-Joseph Natoire

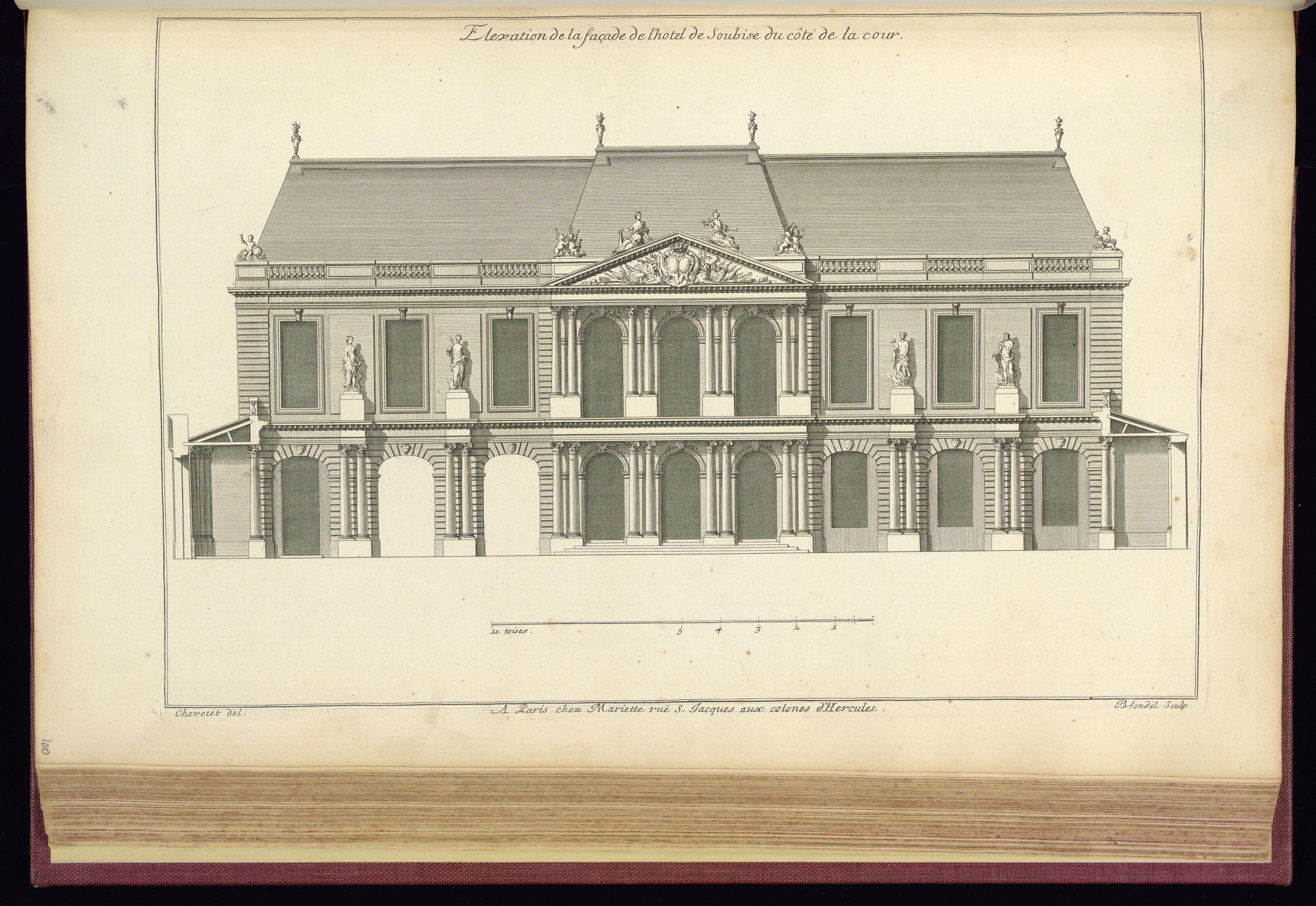
The design of the building

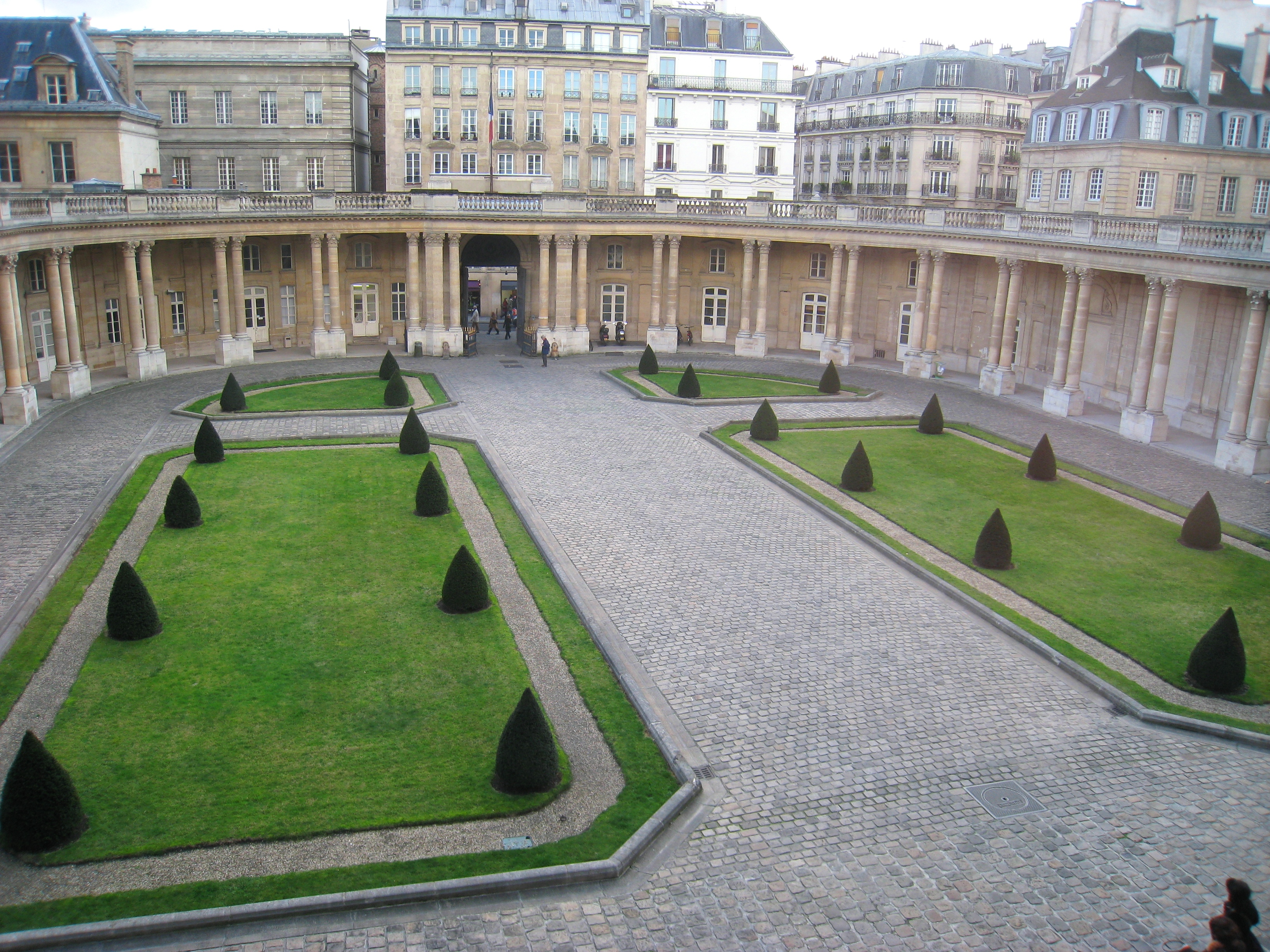
the cour d'honneur of the Hôtel de Soubise

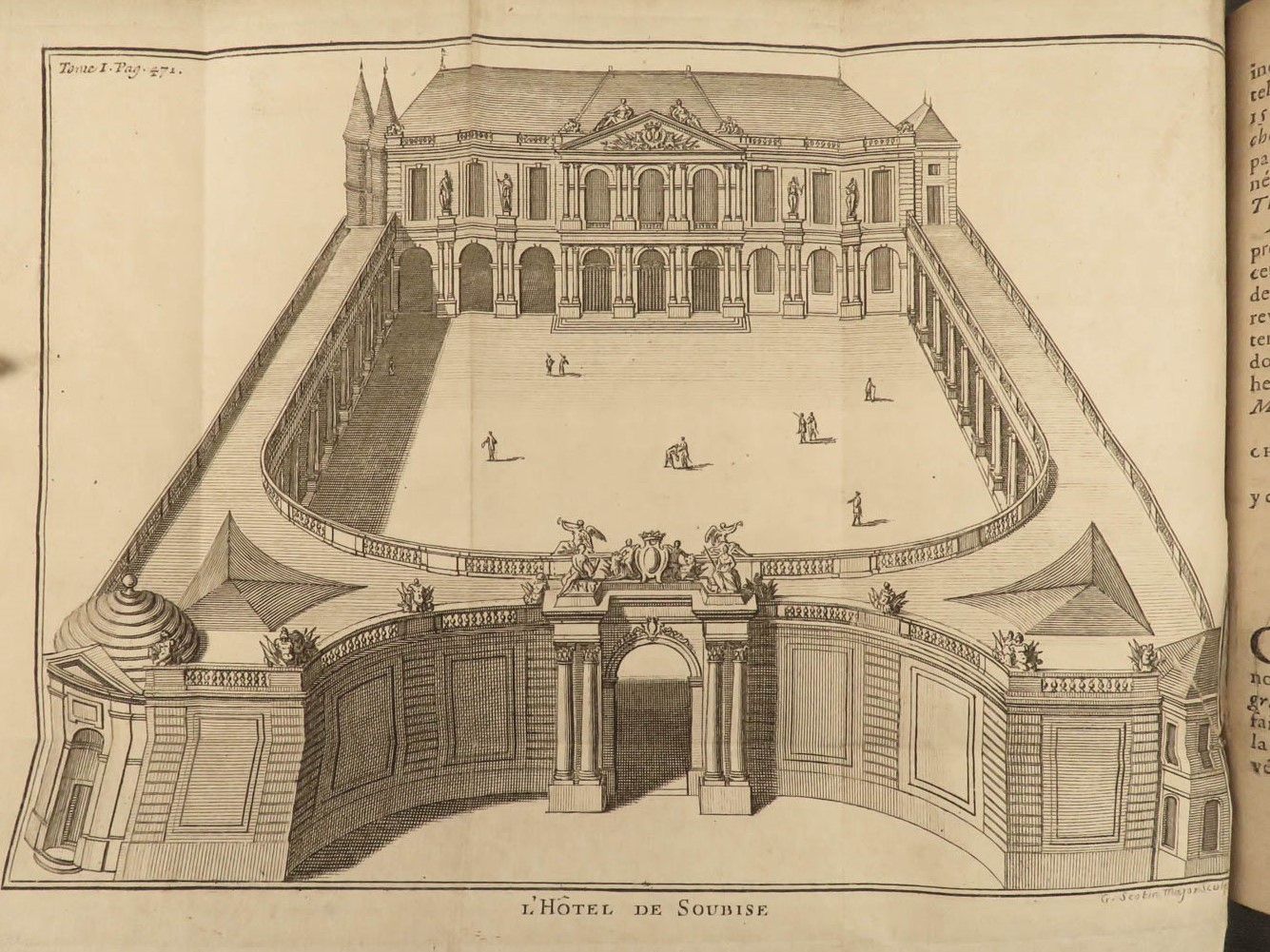
The Hôtel de Soubise in Germain Brice's travel guide, seventh edition, published in 1717

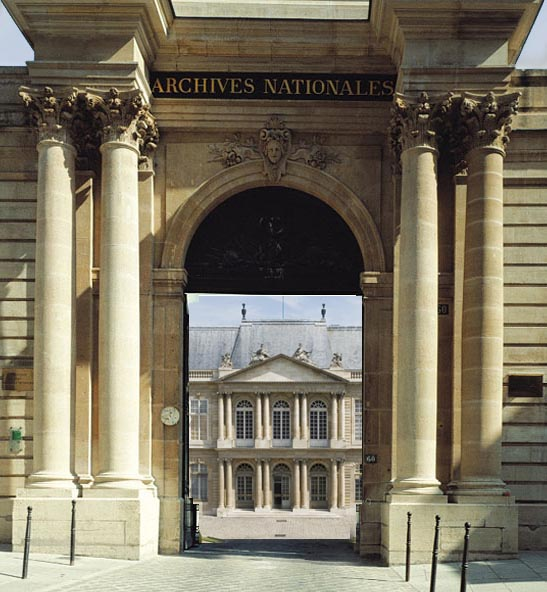
The entrance portal of the Hôtel de Soubise, which served as an inspiration for the design of the new entrance portal of the Hôtel de Besenval, built in 1938 by the architects Moreillon & Taillens

Typus Religionis is a large allegorical painting that depicts a galleon ship as a representation of faith. It was used as evidence in a trial Jesuits during their expulsion from France.

== See also ==
- List of Baroque residences
- Rue des Archives

== Bibliography ==
- Fiske Kimball, 1943. The Creation of the Rococo (Philadelphia Museum of Art).
