= Counts and dukes of Guise =

French noble titles

Count of Guise and Duke of Guise (/ɡwiːz/ GWEEZ, French: [ɡ(ɥ)iz]) were titles in the French nobility.

Originally a seigneurie, in 1417 Guise was erected into a county for René, a younger son of Louis II of Anjou.

While disputed by the House of Luxembourg (1425–1444), the county was ultimately retained by the House of Anjou and its descendants, passing in 1520 to the cadet branch of the ducal House of Lorraine that became known as the House of Guise, headed by Claude of Lorraine. In 1528, the county was elevated to a dukedom and peerage of France for him. The Dukes of Guise and their sons played a prominent role in the French Wars of Religion, during which they were the leaders of the ultra-Catholic faction.

This dukedom became extinct in 1688, and the lands attached to it passed to the Princess Palatine Anne, a great-granddaughter of Charles of Lorraine-Guise, Duke of Mayenne – although she was not the heiress in strict primogeniture, that being the Duke of Mantua. The dukedom was recreated for Anne and her husband, Henri Jules de Bourbon, Prince of Condé in 1704.

On the extinction of the Bourbon-Condé family in 1830, the Guise dukedom was inherited by the House of Orléans, descendants of Anne's granddaughter Louise Henriette de Bourbon, Duchess of Orleans. Louis Philippe of Orléans having become King of the French in 1830, henceforth the title Duke of Guise was used as a courtesy title for members of this family after it was deposed and went into exile in 1848, firstly for three sons of Prince Henri, Duke of Aumale, and then for Prince Jean, son of Robert d'Orléans, Duke of Chartres. In 1926, Jean, Duke of Guise became the Orléanist claimant to the throne of France as "Jean III".

== Counts of Guise (1417–1481 and 1491–1528) ==
=== House of Anjou ===

- René I of Naples (René) (1417–1425)

=== House of Luxembourg ===
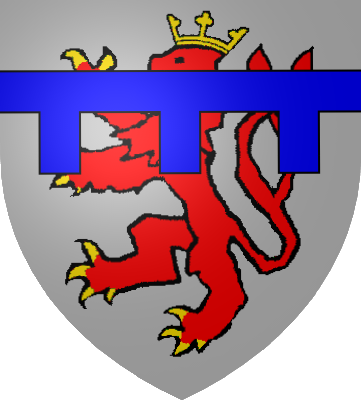

The House of Luxembourg had disputed the countship of Guise, and with the approval of John, Duke of Bedford, English Regent of France, seized the county in 1425.

- John, Count of Ligny (John I) (1425–1441)
- Louis de Luxembourg, Count of Saint-Pol (Louis I) (1441–1444)

=== House of Anjou ===

The marriage of Charles of Le Maine, younger brother of René, to Isabelle of Luxembourg, sister of Louis, allowed him to peacefully recover Guise.

- Charles of Le Maine (Charles I) (1444–1472)
- Charles IV, Duke of Anjou (Charles II) (1472–1481)

=== House of Armagnac – House of Rohan ===

Charles IV left his lands to the Crown, but Guise was granted to his nephew Louis in 1491.

- Louis d'Armagnac, Duke of Nemours (Louis II) (1491–1503)
- Marguerite d'Armagnac, duchesse de Nemours (Marguerite) (d. 1503)
  - held by her husband Pierre de Rohan-Gié (Peter) (1503–1504)
- Charlotte d'Armagnac, duchesse de Nemours (Charlotte) (d. 1504)
  - held by her husband Charles de Rohan-Gié (Charles III) (1504–1520)

=== House of Lorraine ===

In 1520, the Parlement of Paris awarded the countship of Guise to Claude of Lorraine, second son of René II of Lorraine (the grandson of René I of Naples) and heir to his French possessions. The countship was elevated to a dukedom in 1528.

- Claude de Lorraine (Claude) (1520–1528)

== Dukes of Guise (1528–1688 and 1704–1830) ==
=== House of Guise ===

- Claude, Duke of Guise (1496–1550; s.1528) (Claude) (Father of Mary of Guise mother of Mary, Queen of Scots)
- Francis (1519–1563; s. 1550), son of the above;
- Henry I (1550–1588; s. 1563), son of the above;
- Charles (1571–1640; s. 1588), son of the above;
- Henry II (1614–1664; s. 1640), son of the above;
- Louis Joseph (1650–1671; s. 1664), nephew of the above;
- Francis Joseph (1670–1675 s. 1671), son of the above;
- Marie (1615–1688; s.1675), sister of Henry II.

Marie did not marry and had no descendants. She bequeathed Guise to a kinsman, Charles François de Stainville on 8 January 1688. This was undone by the Parlement of Paris at the request of other claimants to the estate, among whom was the wife of France's premier prince du sang Anne Henriette of Bavaria, Princess of Condé, a great-granddaughter of Charles of Lorraine, Duke of Mayenne through her mother. In this way the lands of the House of Guise—and later the ducal title—came to the House of Bourbon-Condé.

=== House of Bourbon-Condé ===

- Anne Henriette of Bavaria (1648–1723), 3rd cousin of Louis Joseph;
- Henry III (1643–1709), husband of the above;
- Louis II (Louis II) (1668–1710), son of the above;
- Louis III Henry (1692–1740), son of the above;
- Louis IV Joseph (1736–1818), son of the above;
- Louis V Henry (1756–1830), son of the above.

Afterwards, the title was extinguished and no longer bestowed. It returned to the royal domain. Louis Henri though left his estate to his godson, Henri d'Orléans, duc d'Aumale. He was bestowed with the personal title of Duke of Guise by Louis-Philippe, King of the French, his grandfather, in 1847.

=== House of Bourbon-Orléans ===

From here on the title became a courtesy title used by the House of Orléans.

- Henri d'Orléans (1847–1847) son of Henri d'Orléans, duc d'Aumale
- François Paul d'Orléans (1852–1852) brother of Henri
- François Louis d'Orléans (1854–1872) brother of Henri and François Paul
- Jean d'Orléans (1874–1940) grandson of Ferdinand Philippe, Duke of Orléans

== See also ==
- House of Guise
- Countesses and Duchesses of Guise
