= Saint-Pierre de Montmartre =

Catholic church in Paris

Church of Saint-Pierre de Montmartre
- Église Saint-Pierre de Montmartre
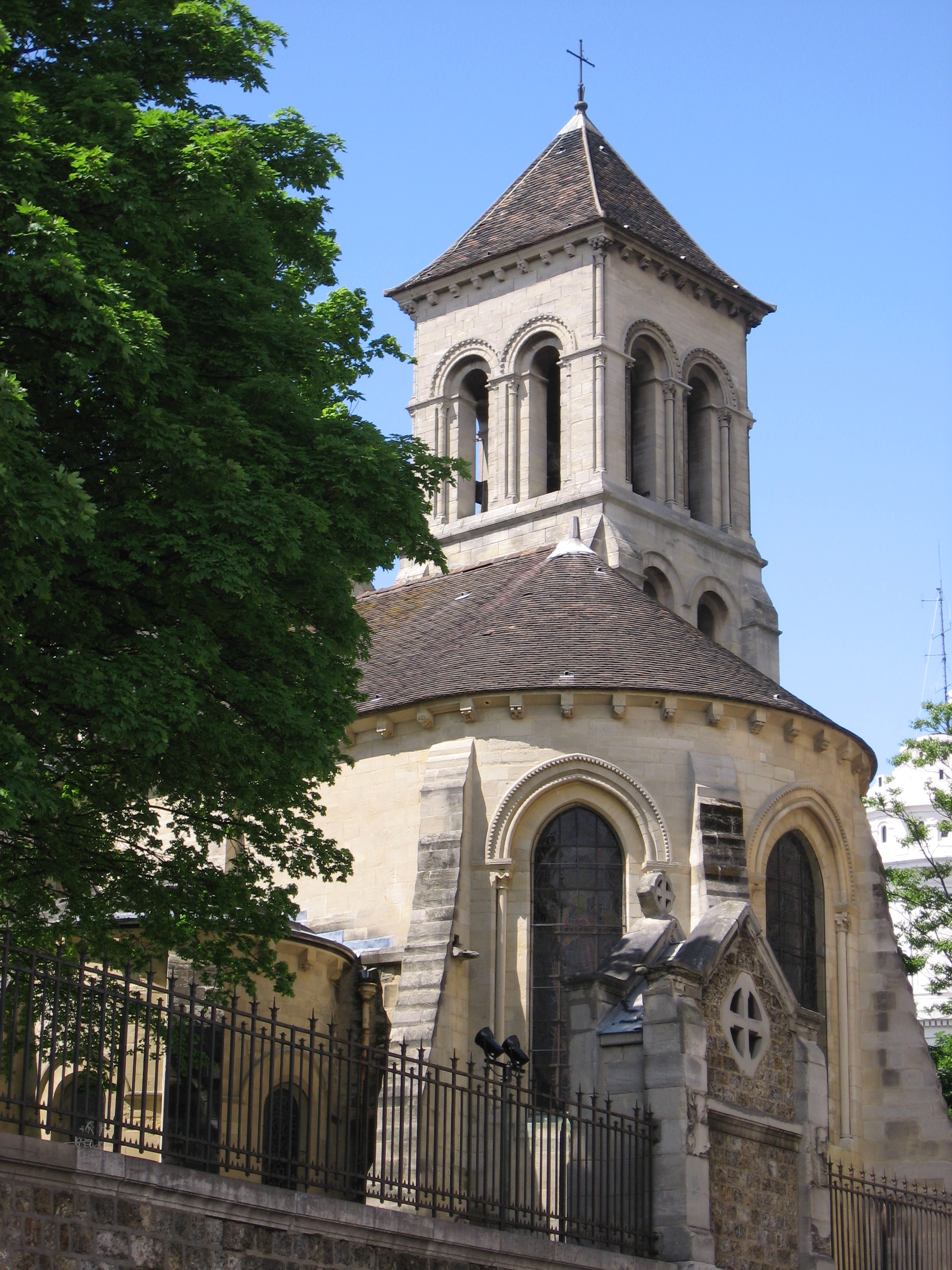
- Church of Saint-Pierre de Montmartre
- 48°53′12″N 2°20′31″E
- Location: 18th arrondissement of Paris
- Country: France
- Denomination: Catholic Church
- Sui iuris church: Latin Church

Saint-Pierre de Montmartre (French pronunciation: [sɛ̃ pjɛr də mɔ̃martr]) is the second oldest surviving church in Paris, after the Abbey of Saint-Germain-des-Pres. It is one of the two main churches on Montmartre, the other being the more famous 19th-century Sacré-Cœur Basilica, just above it.

Saint-Pierre de Montmartre, whose construction begun in 1133, was the church of the prestigious Montmartre Abbey, destroyed during the French Revolution. According to the earliest biography of Saint Ignatius Loyola, the martyrium of Montmartre Abbey was the location where the vows were taken that led to the founding of the Society of Jesus.

== History ==
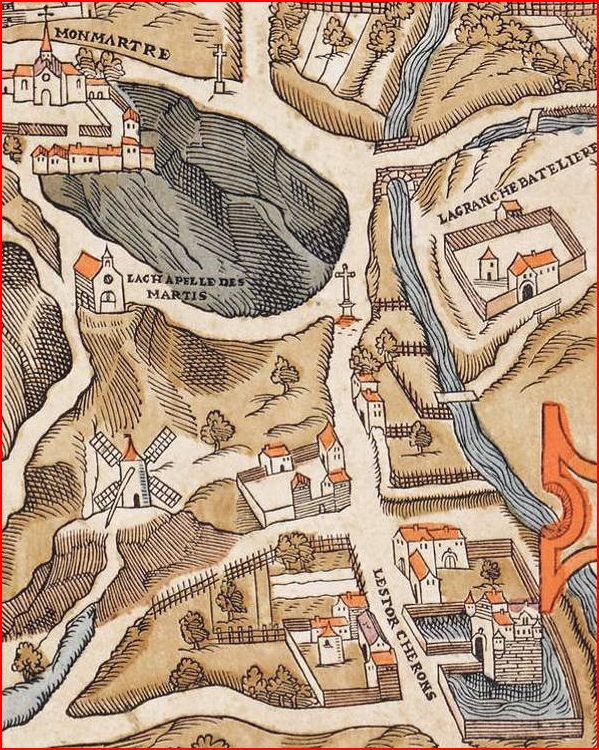
The Church and Abbey in 1550, top left

According to the traditional history of the church, it was founded by Saint Denis in the third century, but only scattered signs of Gallo-Roman occupation have been detected at the much-disturbed site,

Merovingian sarcophagi and column capitals dating from the 7th century indicate that there was a church on the summit of the butte of Montmartre, dedicated to Saint Peter, since the 6th century. Théodore Vacquier, the first municipal archaeologist of Paris, identified remains of a wall as belonging to the Temple of Mars, from which he believed Montmartre took its name.

An early church, the "Sanctum Martrium", or "Chapel of Martyrs", was built on the same site in the 9th century, to mark the traditional location on the southern side of the hill where it was believed that the patron saint of Paris, Saint Denis, was beheaded, along with the priest Eleuthere and the Diacre Rustique. Ignatius of Loyola and his followers chose the same site for the foundation the Company of Jesus, or Jesuit order in 1534. In the ninth century the church became a stop for pilgrims going to the Saint Denis Basilica.

In 1133, Louis VI purchased the territory of Montmartre from the monks of the Abbey of Saint-Martin-des-Champs. He and his wife, Adelaide de Savoye, founded a royal convent for Benedictine nuns from the Monastery of Saint-Pierre-des-Dames. The church had two functions; the eastern portion, dedicated to the Virgin Mary and to Saint Denis, was used by the nuns, while the western portion, dedicated to Saint Peter, were used by the residents of the local parish.

The abbey was reconsecrated by Pope Eugenius III in 1147, in a lavish royal ceremony where Bernard of Clairvaux (better known as Saint Bernard) and Peter, Abbot of Cluny, acted as acolytes.

In 1622, the chapel of the Holy Martyr was converted to a priory, which was designated "the lower church". The 1670s and early 1680s marked a special moment in the history of the abbey. During the years when Françoise Renée de Lorraine, the sister of Marie, Duchess of Guise, was abbess, and especially while Marguerite Louise d'Orléans, Grand Duchess of Tuscany, was in confined residence there, starting in 1675, music came to play an important role in the abbey religious services. Marc-Antoine Charpentier, Marie's composer, wrote devotional music to be performed there.

By the 1680s the buildings of the upper abbey were in poor condition. In 1686 the religious community abandoned the buildings, except for the abbey church, and moved down the hill to a new priory. The church was preserved as a choir for the nuns and a sepulchre for the Abbesses.

=== Revolutionary destruction and rebuilding ===
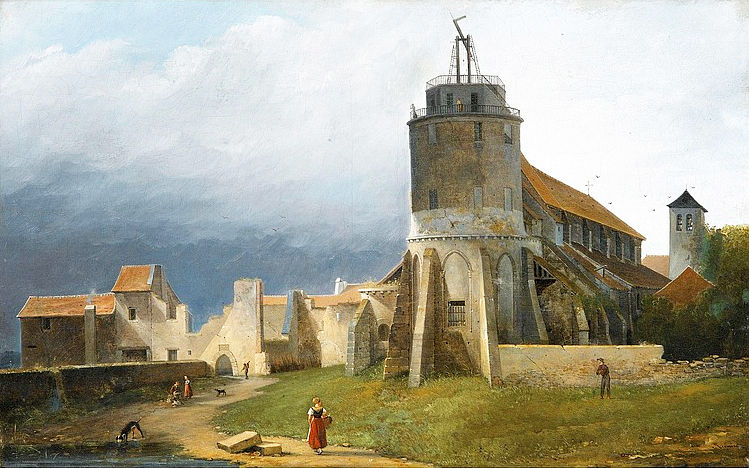
Ruins of the chapel, with a tower used as telegraph station, by Antoine-Louis Goblain (1820)

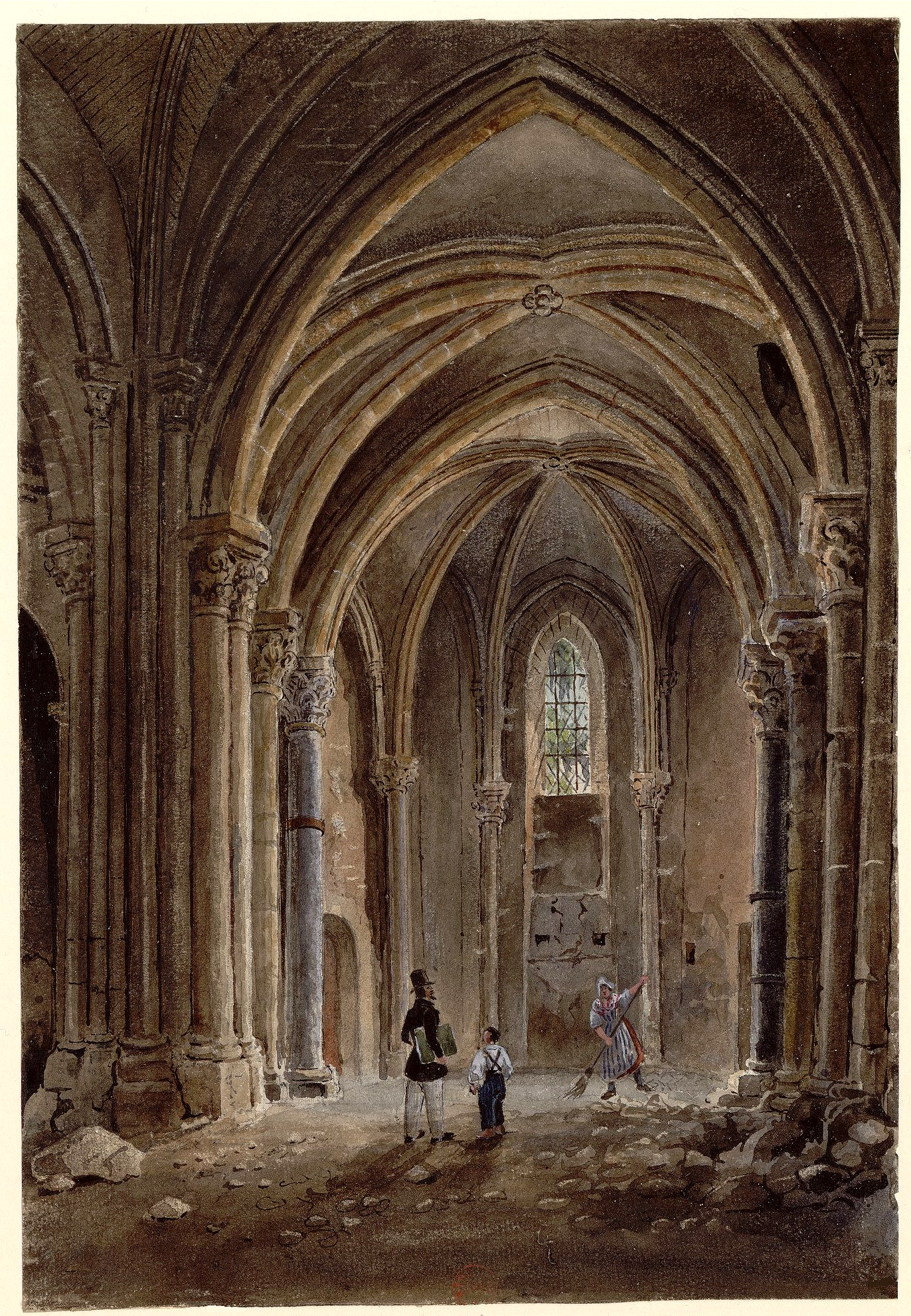
The ruined church in the 19th century

During the French Revolution, the Abbey of Montmartre and the crypts were destroyed, and the chapel was transformed for a time into a "Temple of Reason", then largely abandoned. In 1794 the tower was rebuilt by Claude Chappe for the purpose of sending messages by visual telegraph signals to other towers in line of sight. Following the defeat of Napoleon, it was used as a barracks by occupying Russian soldiers in 1814. It barely escaped demolition, but was largely abandoned. It was finally restored by the architect Ernest-Claude Sauvageot between 1899 and 1905, and was formally returned to the church in 1908.

== Exterior ==
The entry to the church is nearly hidden behind a tree-filled courtyard. The facade dates from the 1775, and features three modern cast bronze doorways, added in 1980 by the Italian sculptor Tommaso Gismondi (1906–2003). They illustrate scenes from the lives of three figures associated with the church: the Virgin Mary, Saint Peter, and Saint Denis of Paris. A gateway from the parvis of the church gives access to the Cemetery of Calvary, the old graveyard of the parish. It is only open on 1 November, All Saints' Day.

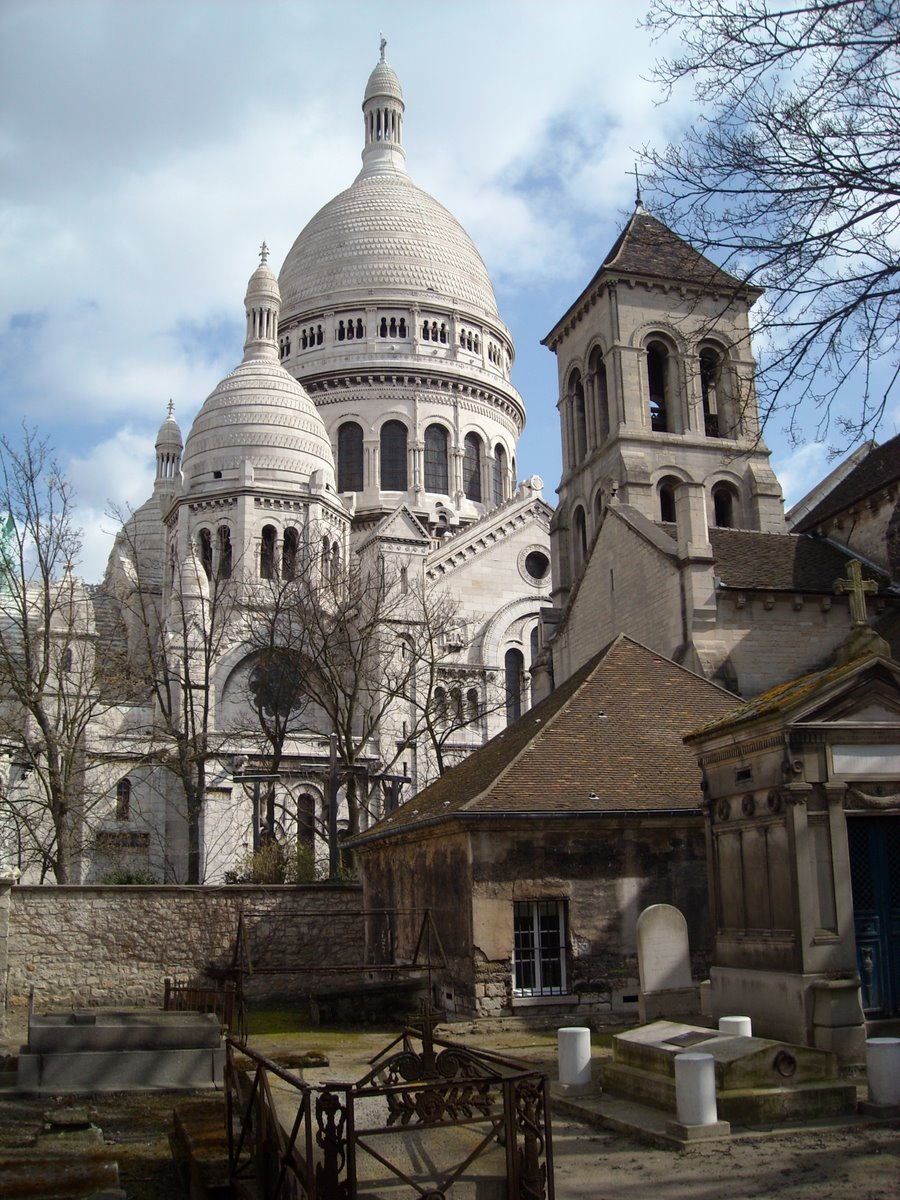
The cemetery and church, looking up the Basilica of Sacré Coeur

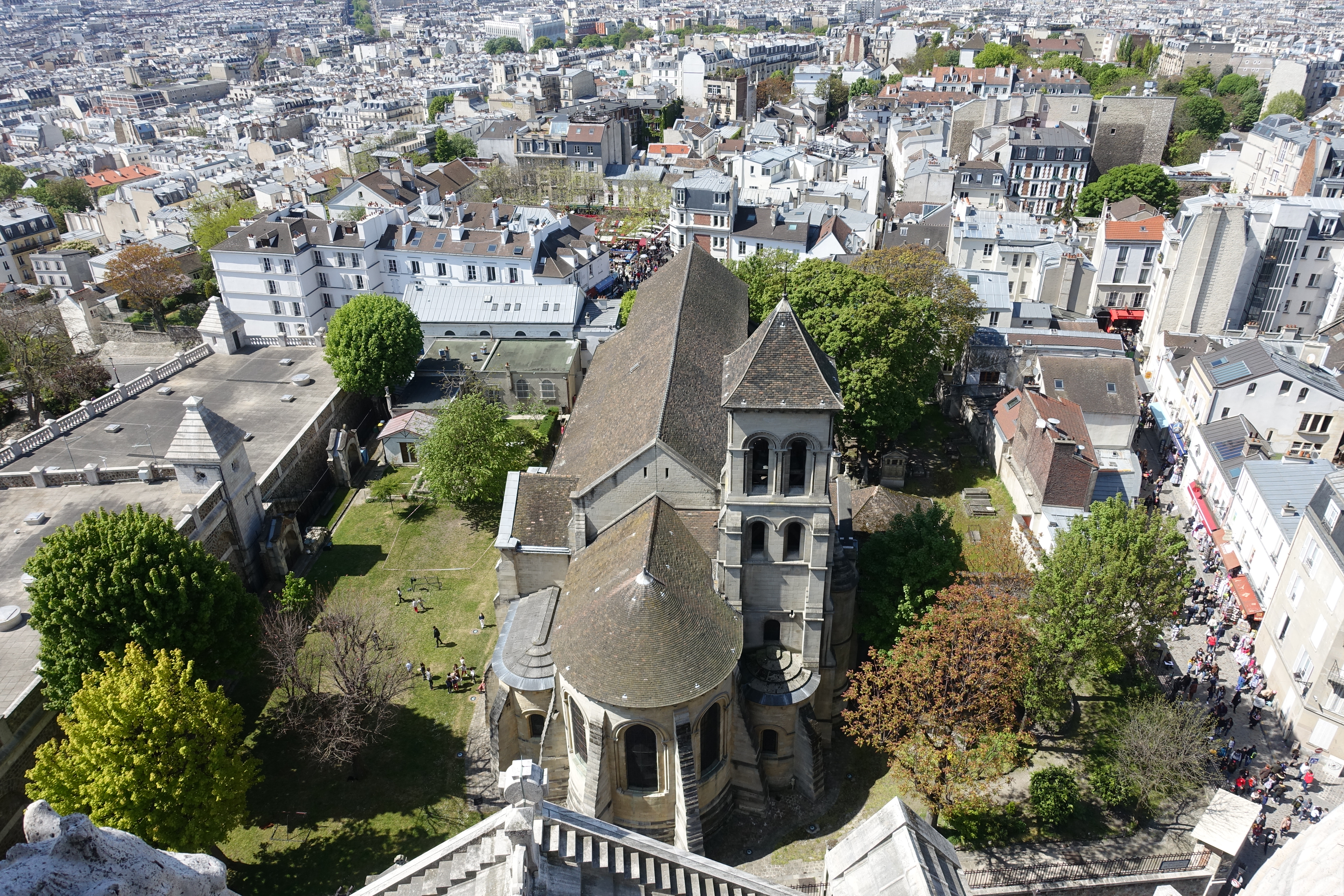
The church seen from above, from the dome of the Basilica of Sacre Coeur. The Cemetery of Calvary is to the right of the church.

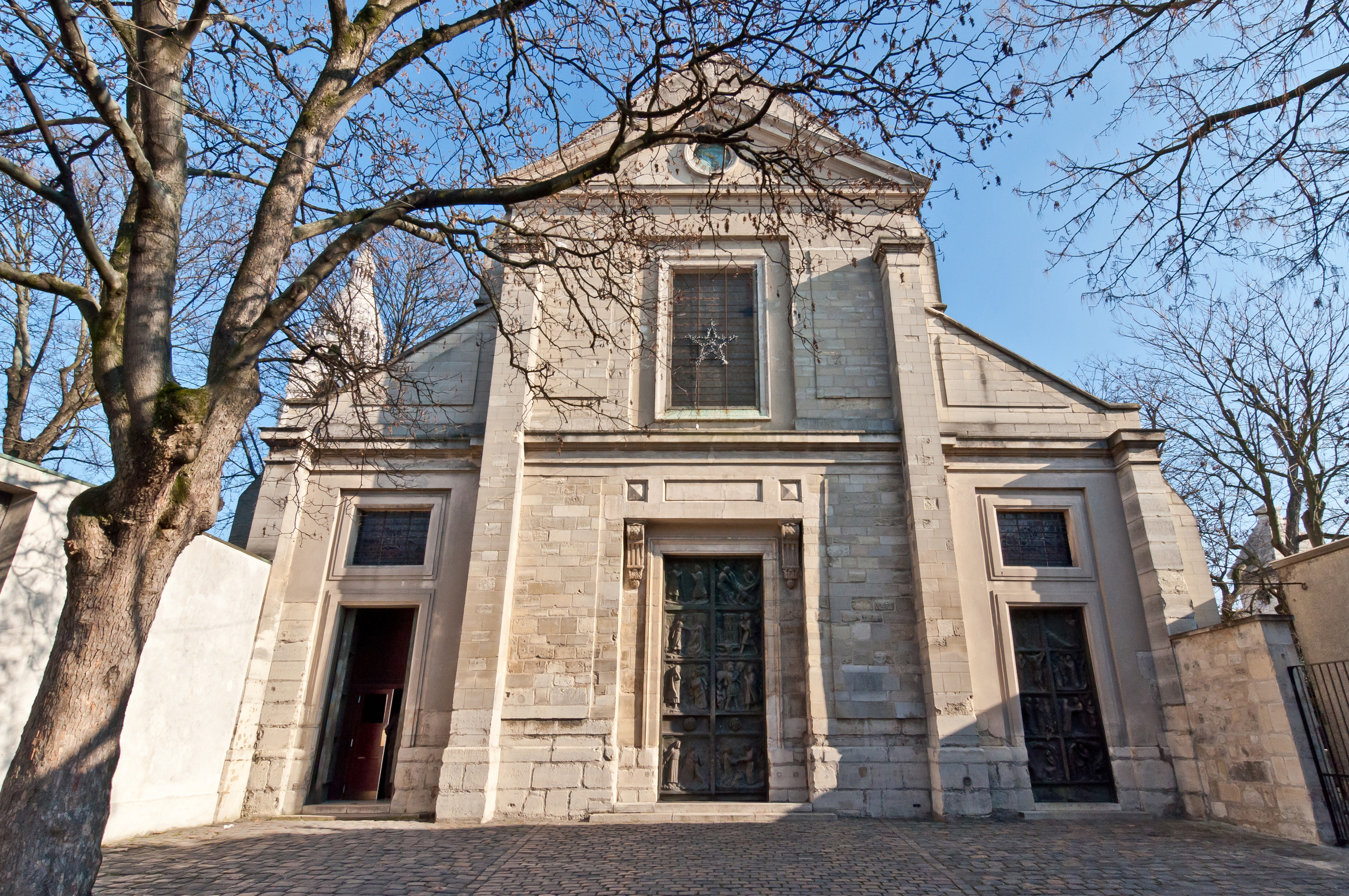
The west front and portal

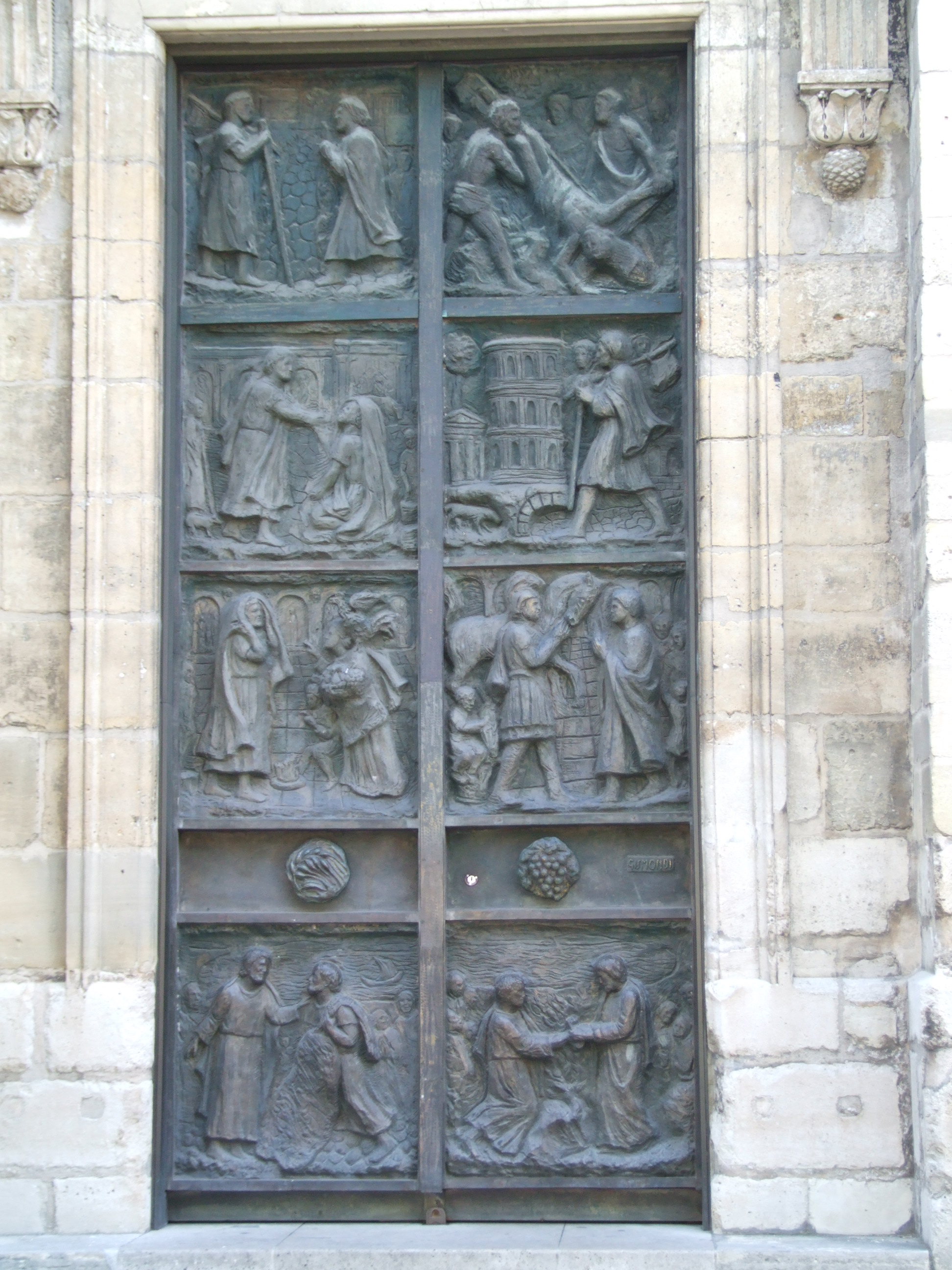
Detail of the bronze central doorway

== Interior ==
The plan of the interior follows the Romanesque model. The nave is flanked by lower side aisles, the transept between the nave and choir does not extend outside the central structure, and the apse at the east end has a ring of small radiating chapels.

The nave dates to the 12th century. The pillars that support the vaulted roof have a cruciform shape, and are composed of bundles of slender columns. The capitals of columns have a variety of Romanesque and early Gothic motifs, including acanthus leaves, crochets and stylised water lilies.

The lower aisle on the right side of the nave, facing the choir, has several picturesque capitals on the columns, dating from the 12th century. These feature several fantastic birds, as well as allegorical figures; one capital features a man with the head of a pig astride another man with the head of a goat, representing Luxury and Sorcery.

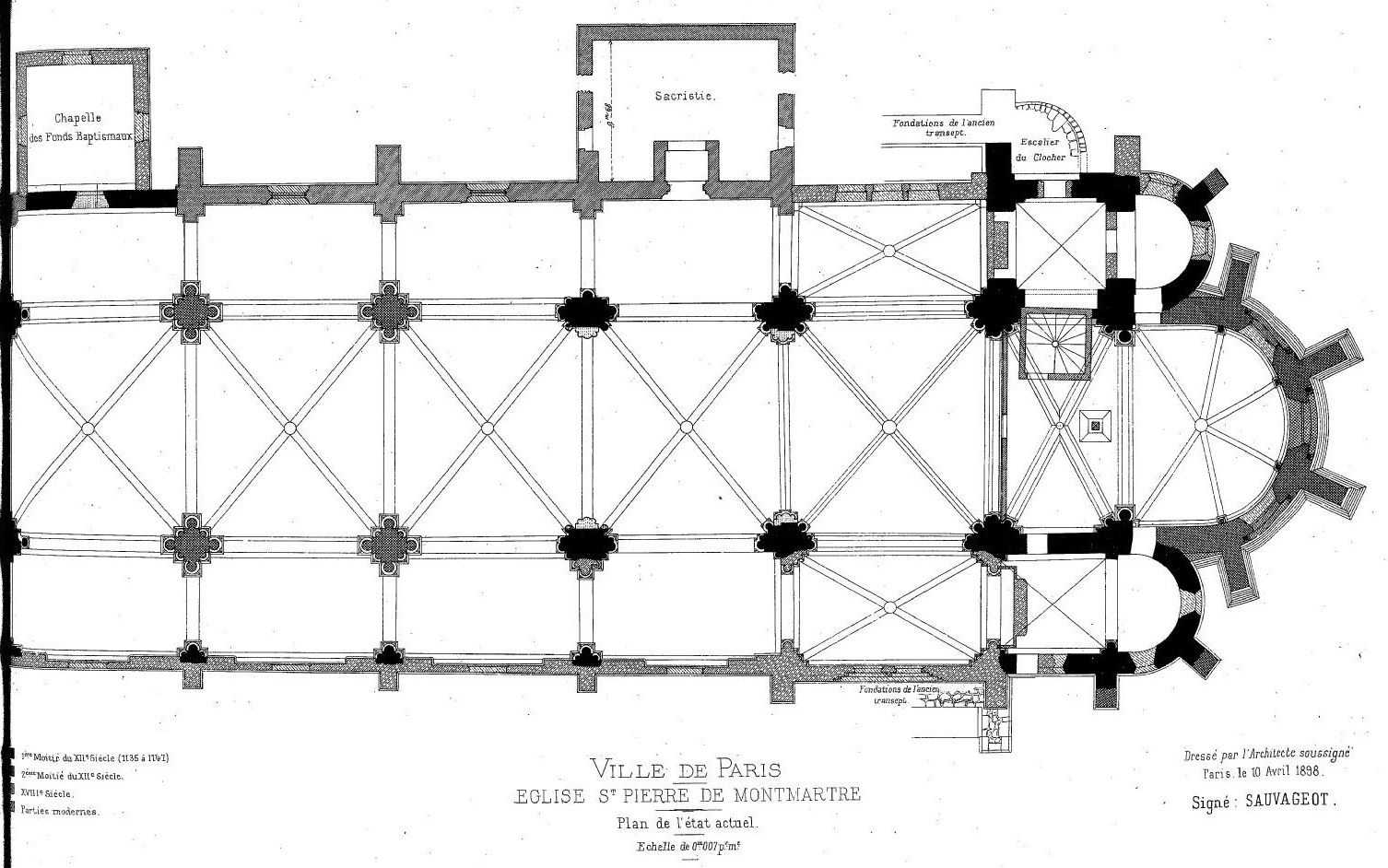
The plan of the church in 1898, with the transept still unfinished

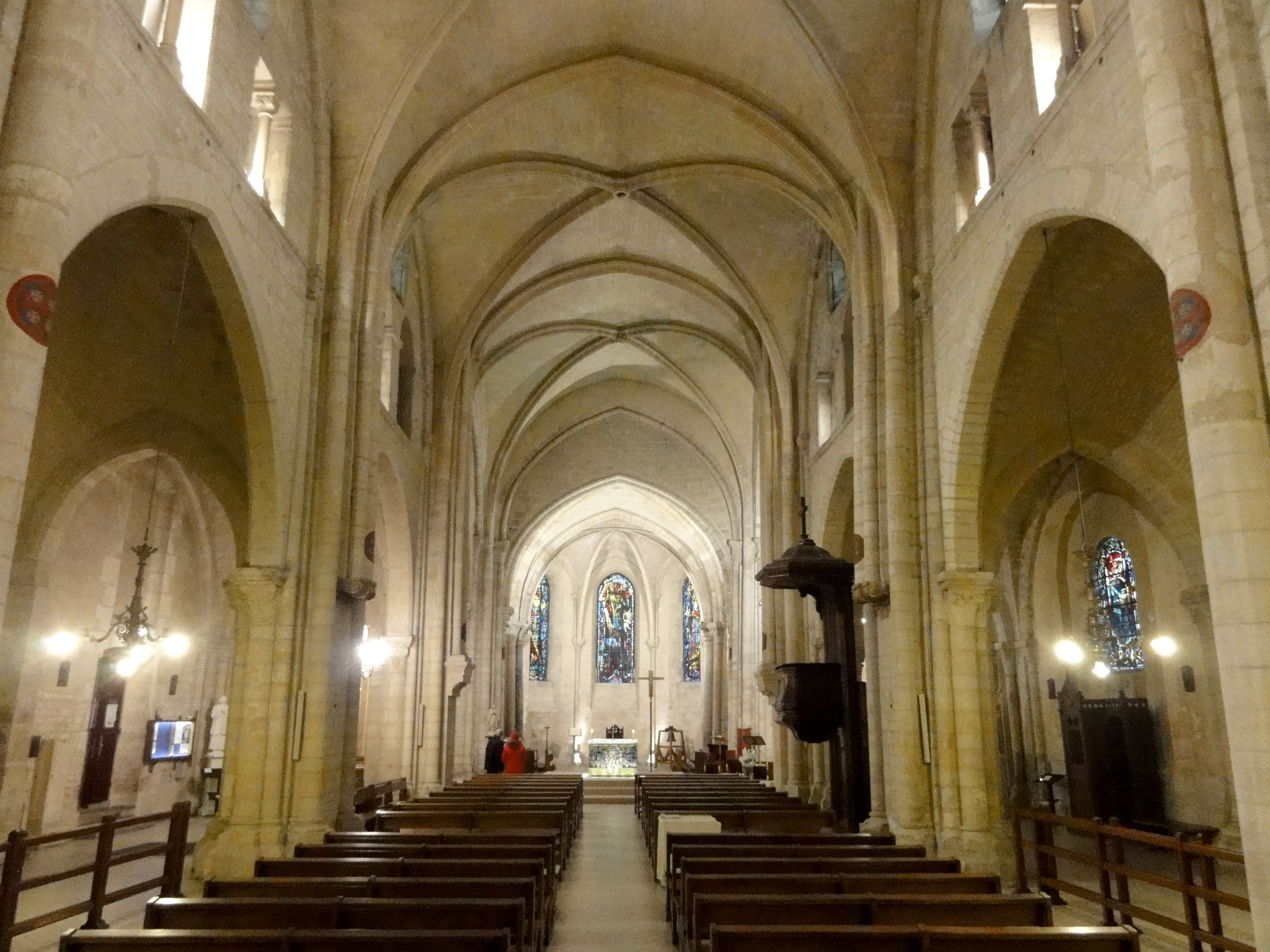
The nave, looking toward the east

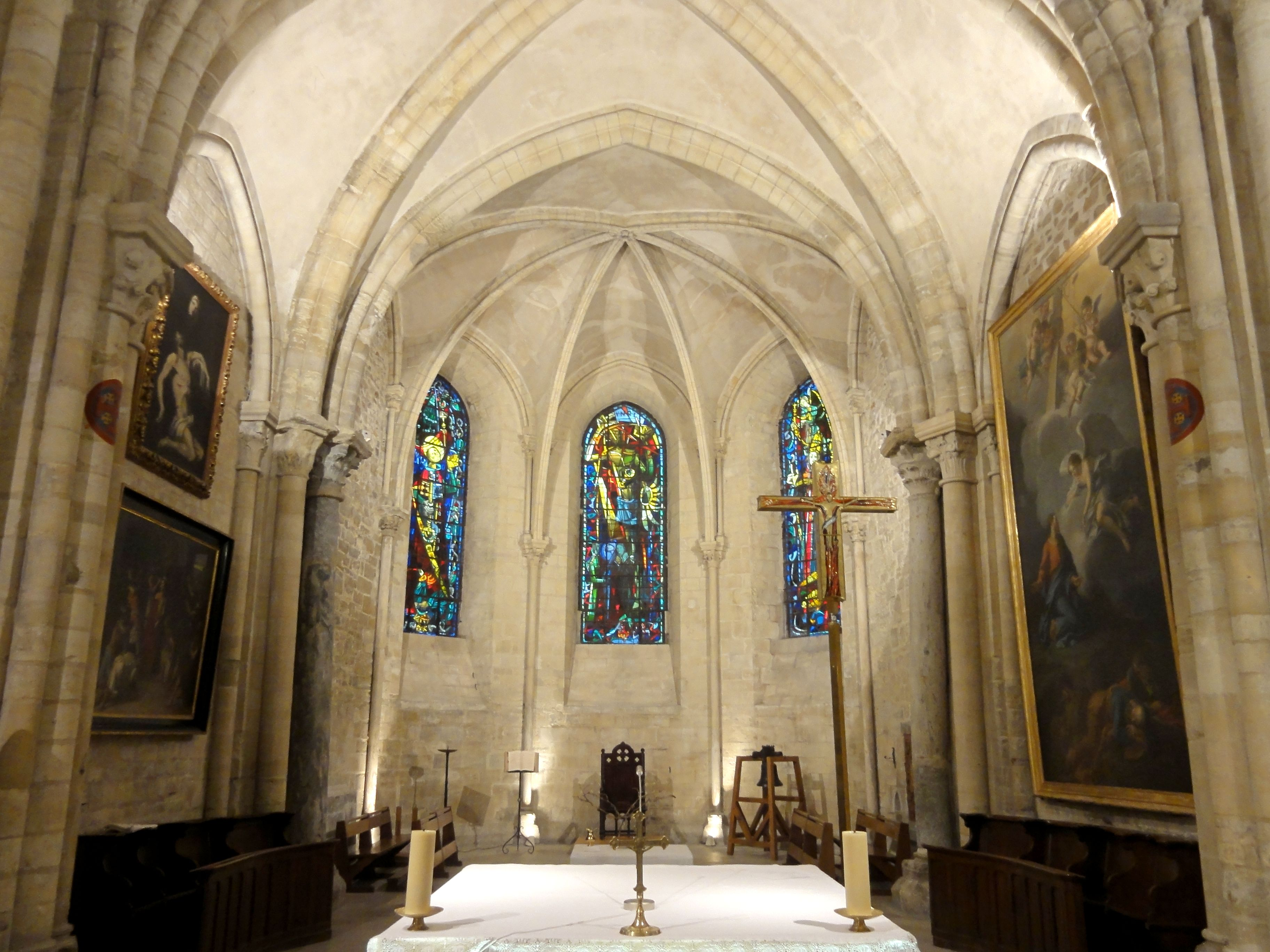
The choir and apse of the church

The oldest and most picturesque architecture is found in the choir and the apse. The single traverse of the choir was given a new vaulted ceiling in 1147, with crossing ribs. The apse was rebuilt at the end of the 12th century in the shape of a pentagon. Its roof is supported by a network of six elegant ribs. The double arch which separates the choir from the apse has another unusual feature; it rests upon two ancient columns, dating from the 2nd or 3rd centuries AD, with carved marble capitals from the Merovingian period (6th–7th centuries A.D.)

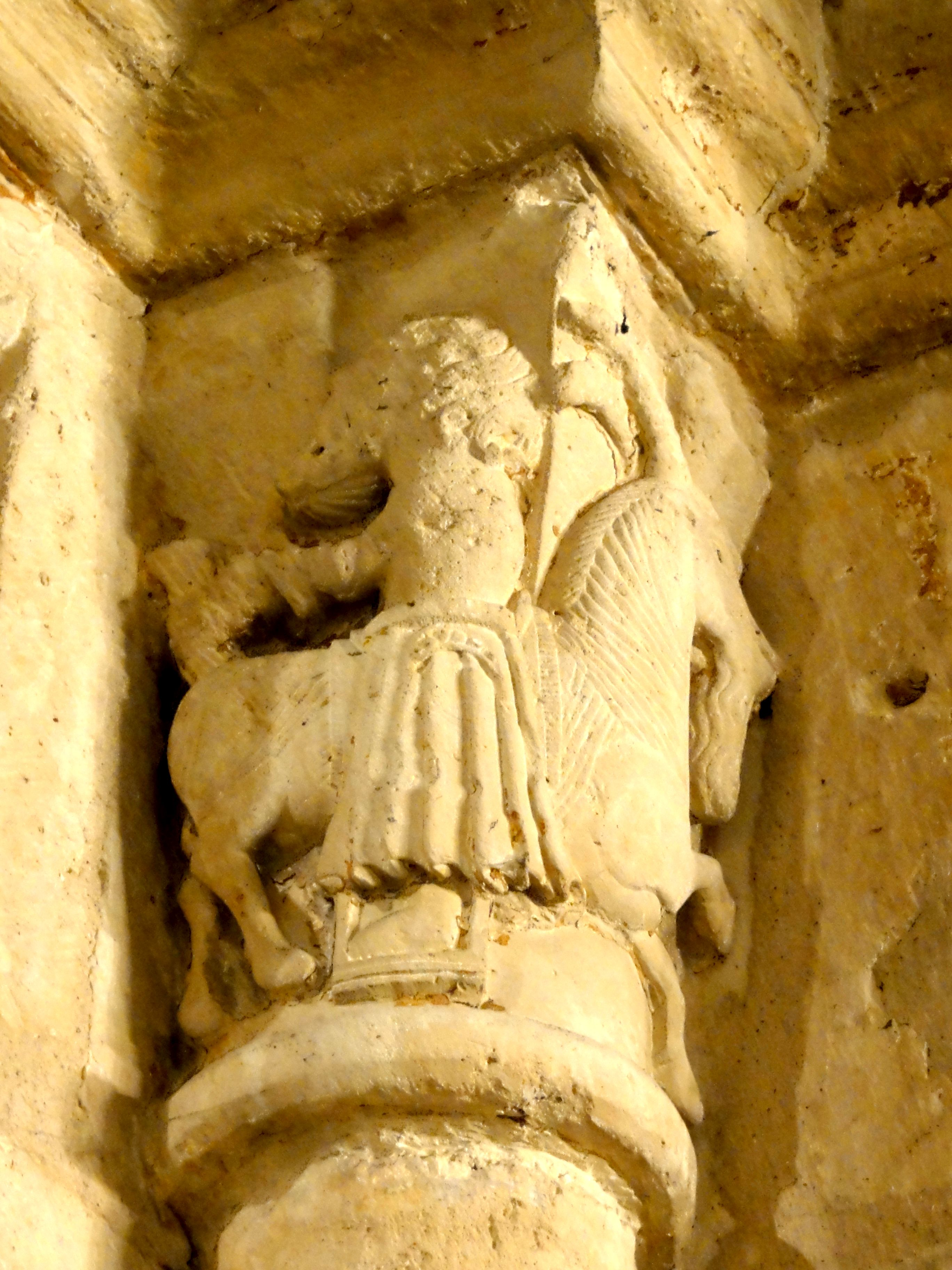
Column capital representing Luxury and Sorcery, 12th century

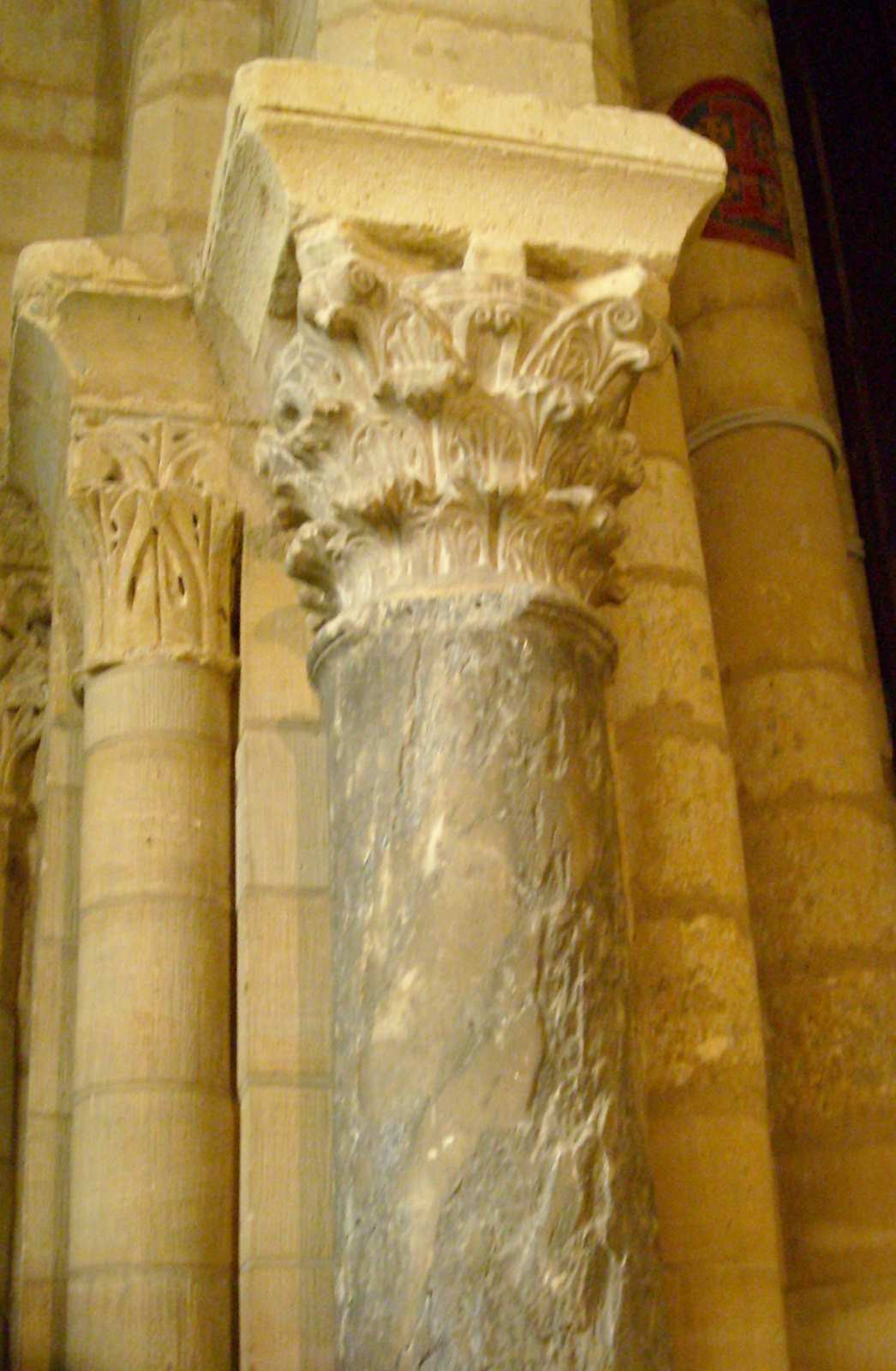
A re-used ancient Roman column with a Merovingian capital

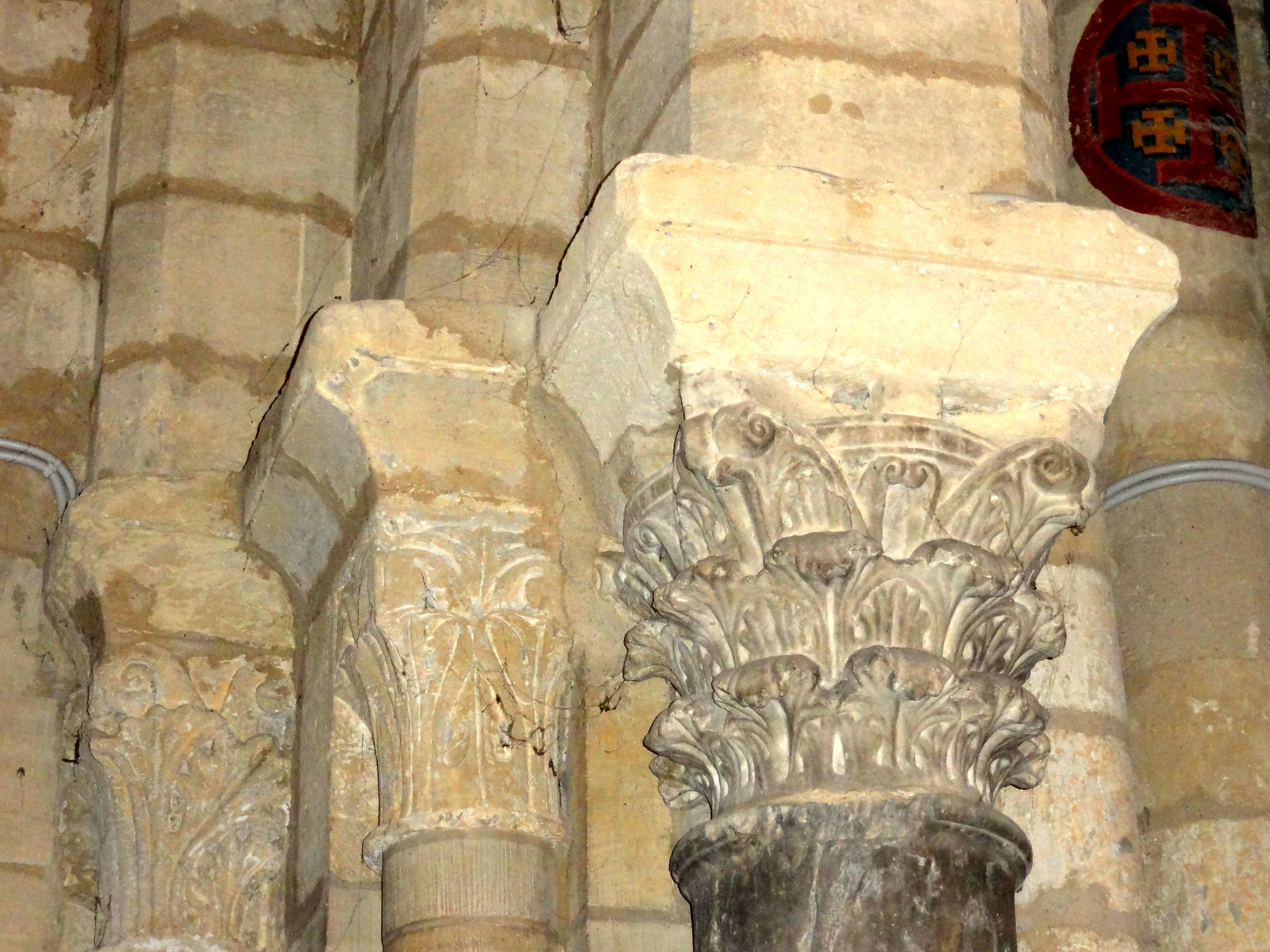
Merovingian column capitals, 6th-7th c., south side, first traverse

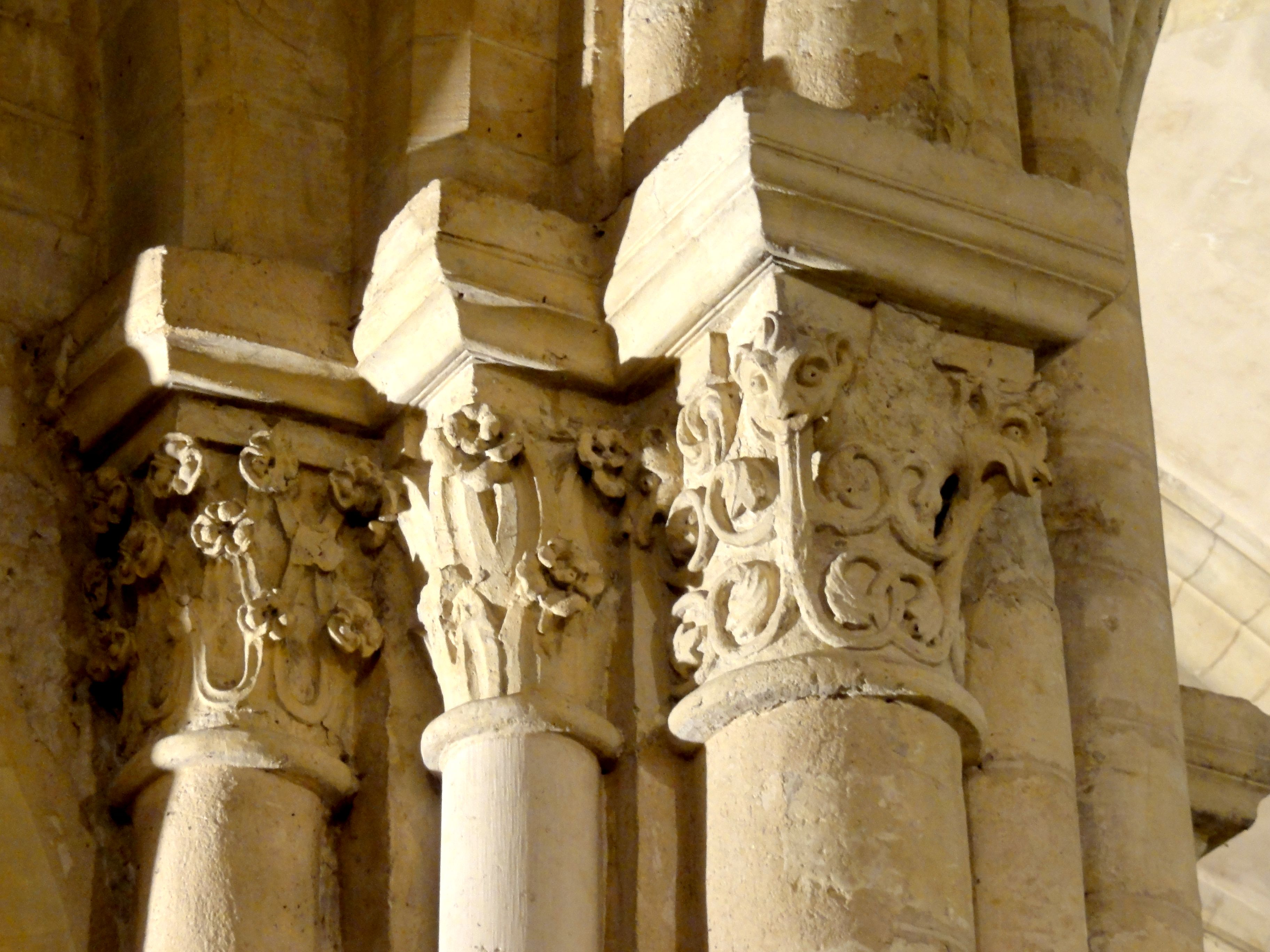
Column capitals on the north traverse, southeast angle

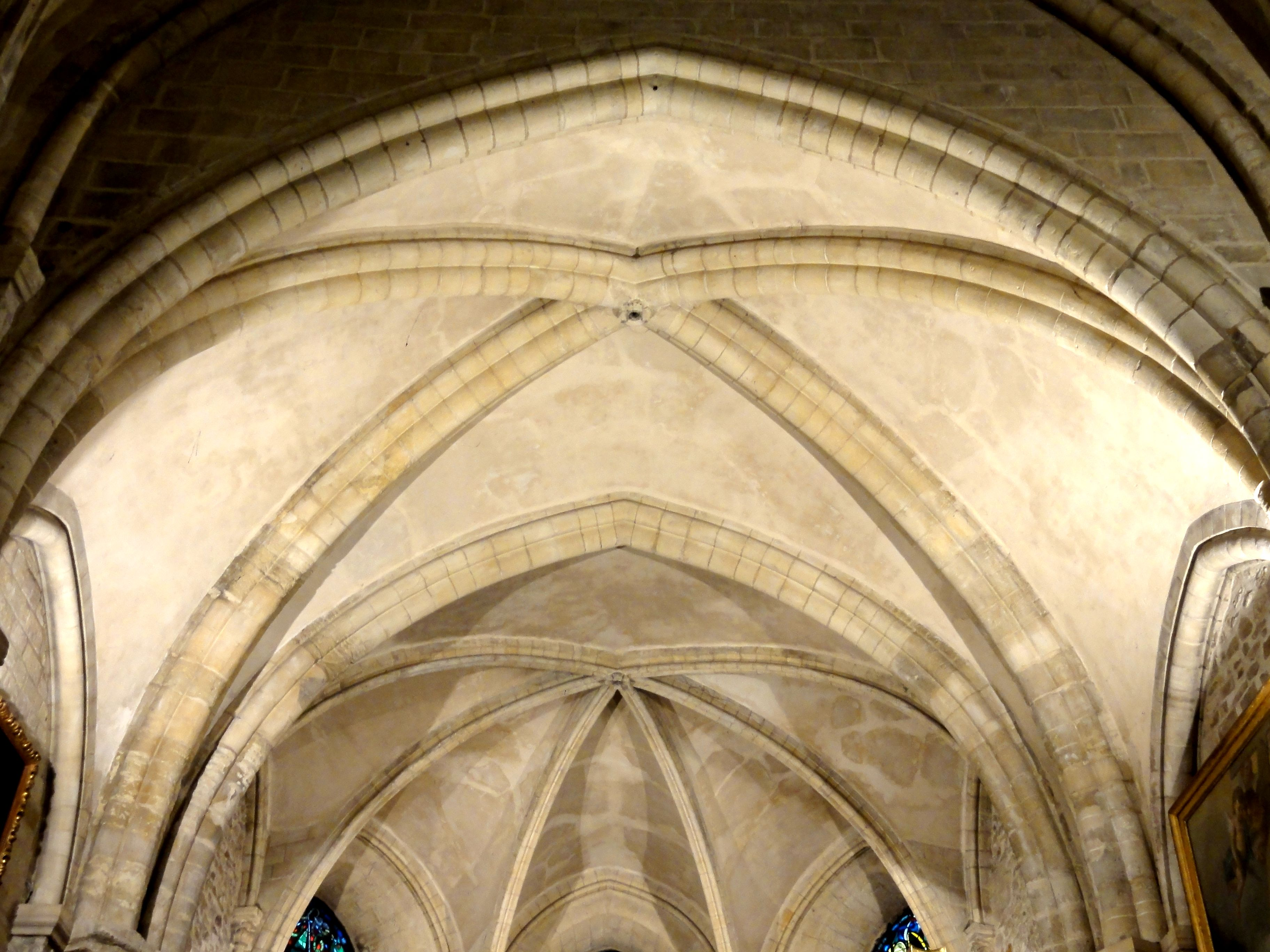
Traverse and vault of the choir, 12th century

=== Art and decoration ===
– The church displays a statue of Our Lady of Montmartre, also known as Our Lady of Beauty, the patron saint of the artists of Montmartre. It was donated to the church in 1942 by a Montmartre painter, Prince Gazi. It is now the object of an annual pilgrimage on November 11, renewing a tradition that dated back before the French Revolution.

– The Chapel of Baptisms features an oval baptismal font, dating from 1537, and made in the form of the traditional cradle of Moses. The decoration on the font is in the Renaissance style.

– The statue of Saint Peter on his throne, located in the lower aisle on the south side, is a copy of a work displayed in St. Peter's Basilica at the Vatican in Rome.

– The painting "Christ in the Garden of Olives", in the choir, was created by Joseph-François Parrocel (1704–1781). It depicts Christ receiving a message from God carried by an angel, while the apostles sleep below, and contrasts the somber shadows of the earthly world below with the illumination of the heavens at the top of the painting.

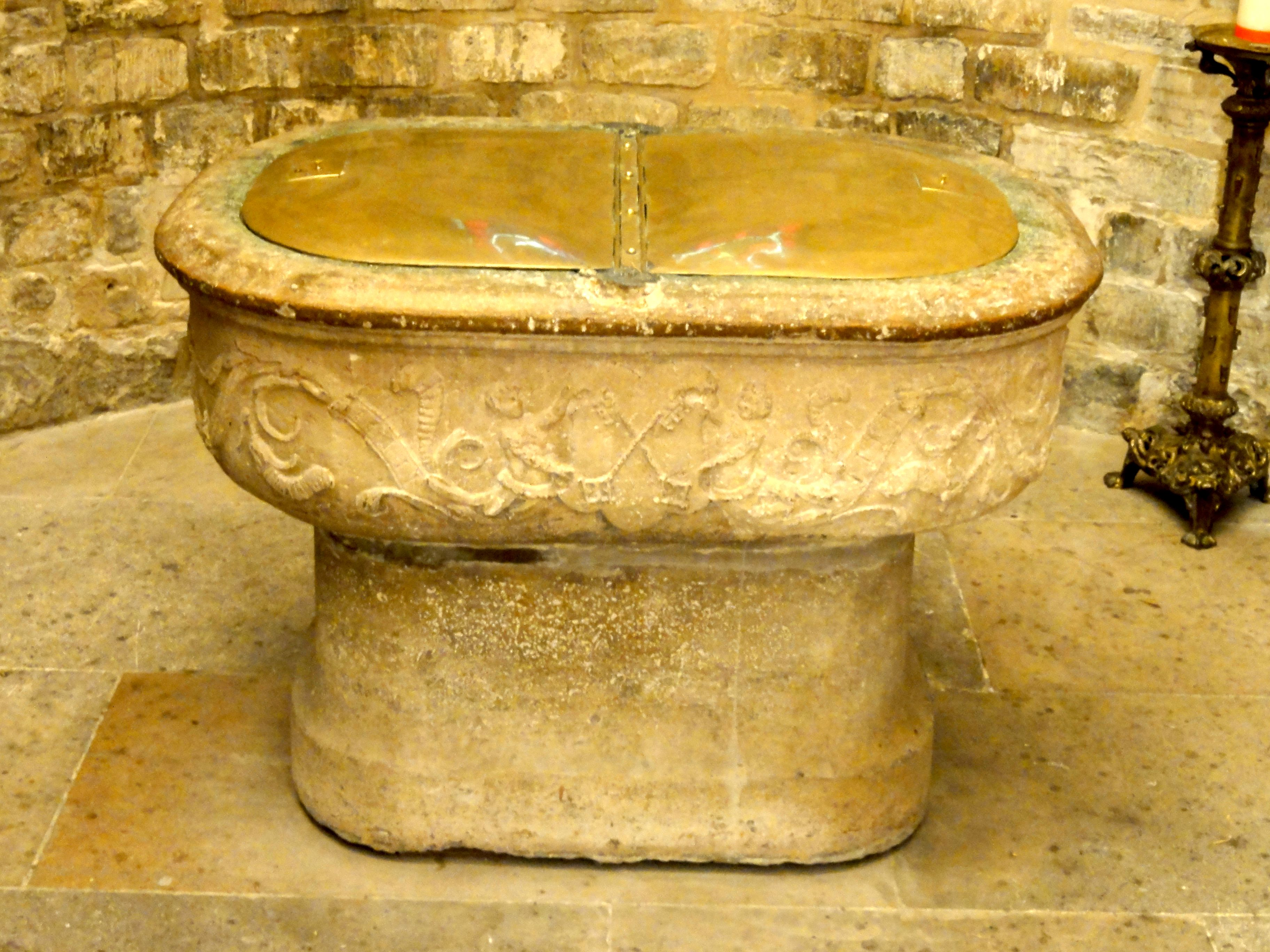
The baptismal font, in the form of the cradle of Moses, 16th century

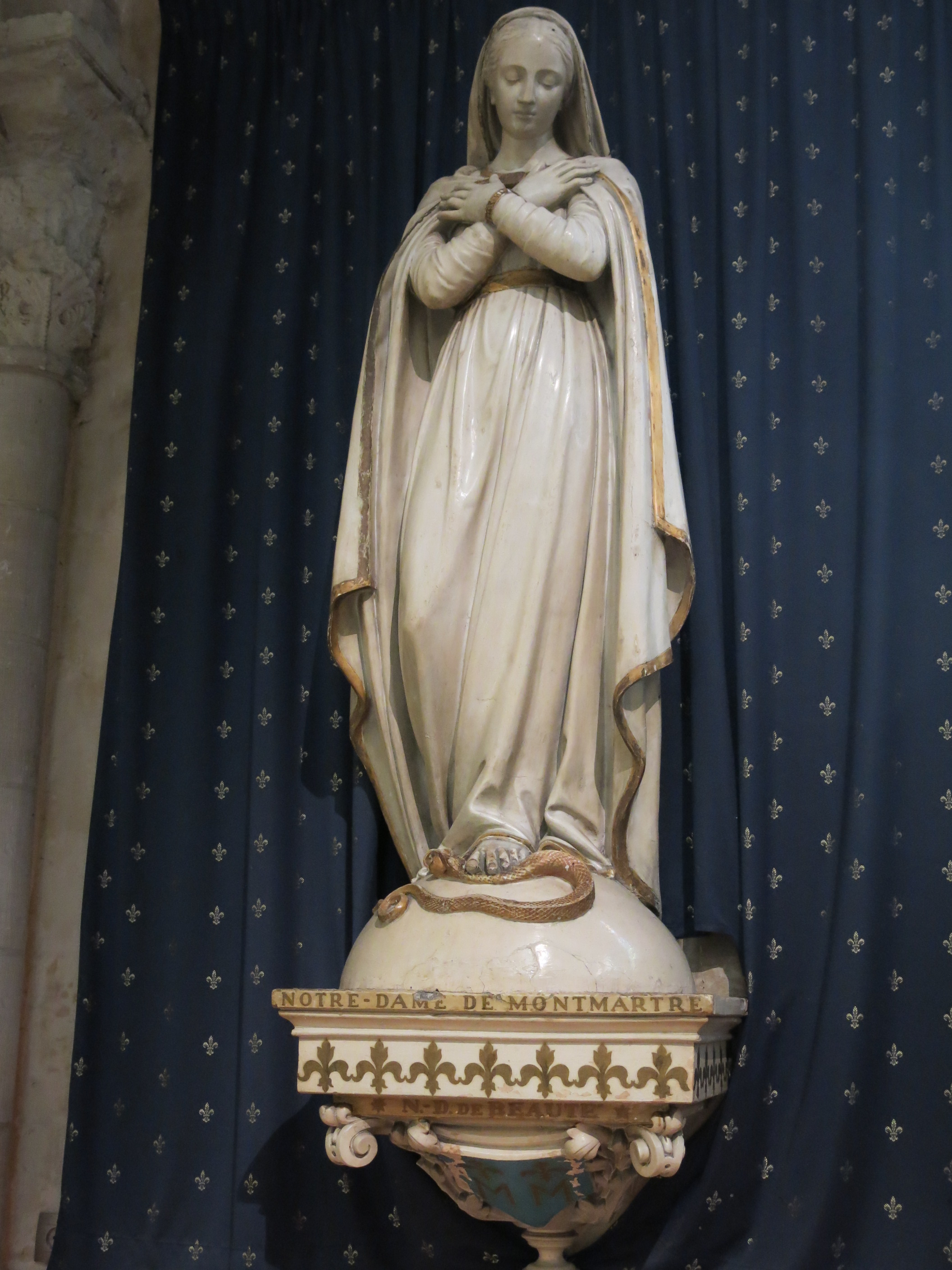
A statue of Our Lady of Montmartre, patron saint of the artists of Montmartre

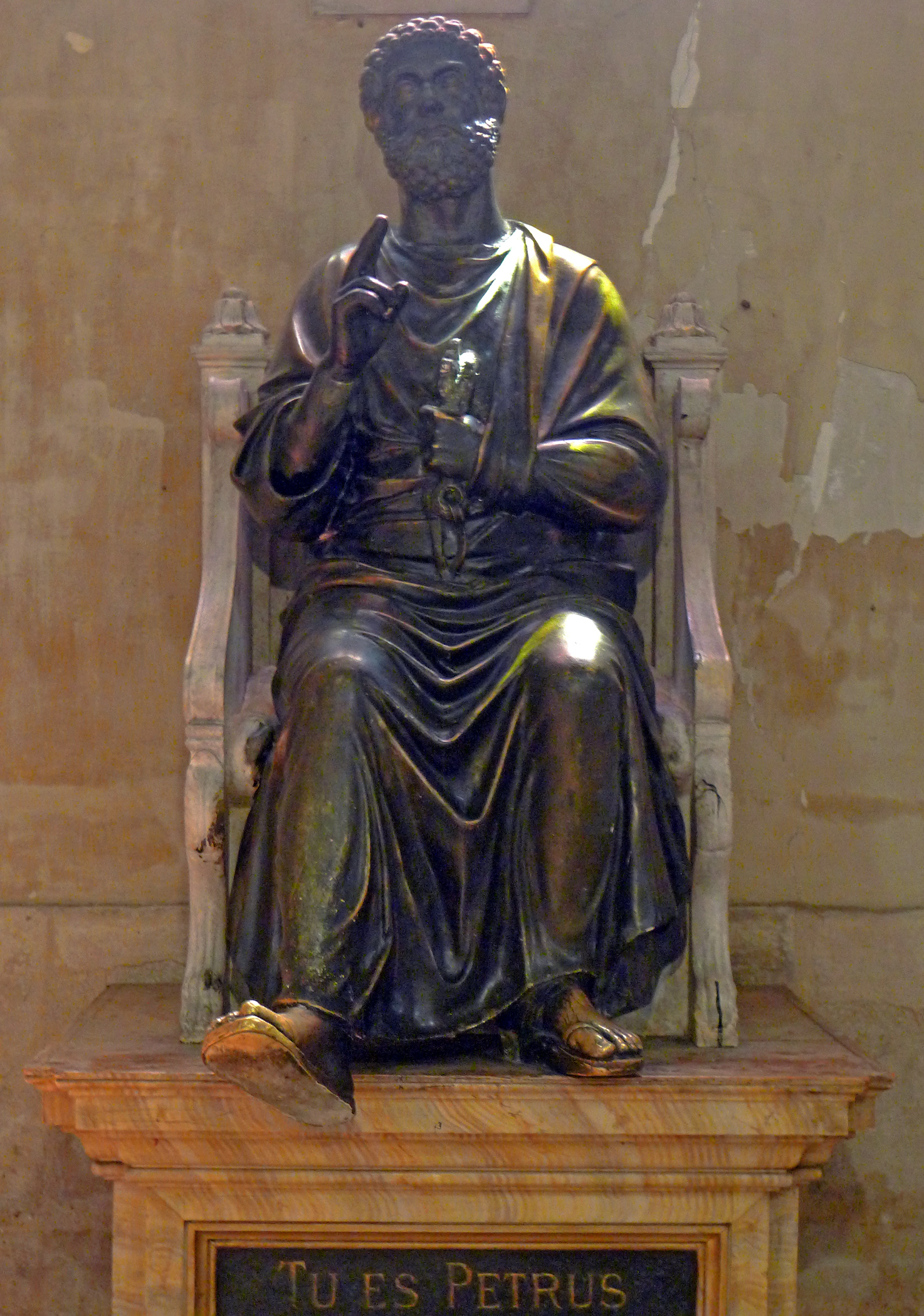
Saint Peter on his Throne, a copy of a work in the Vatican

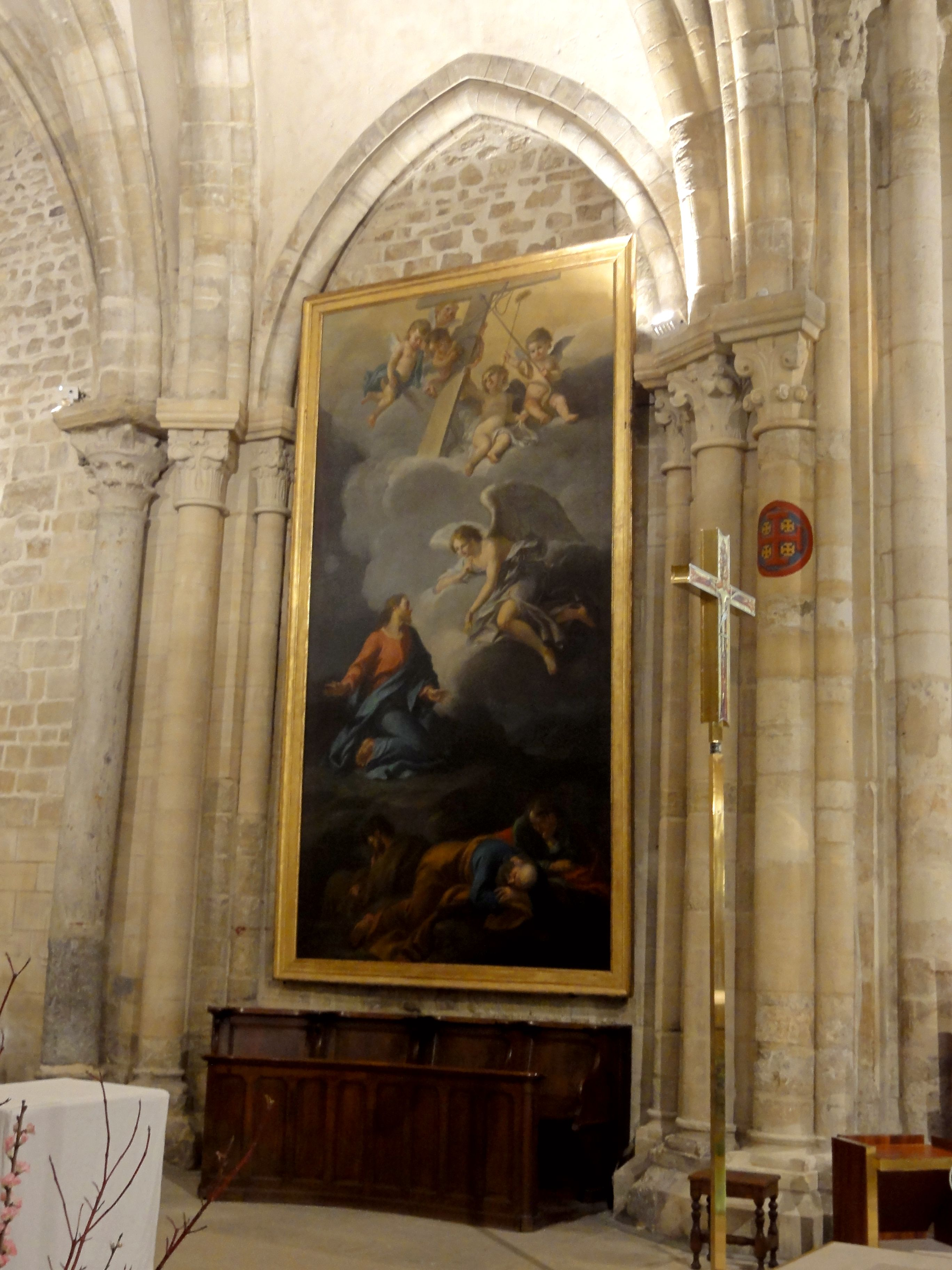
"Christ in the Garden of Olives" by Joseph-François Parrocel, in the choir, 1704–1781

=== The organ ===
The main organ originally was located in the church of Notre-Dame-de-Lorette, which was demolished in 1840. The case of the organ is made from oak, with three towers, and dates to the end of the 18th century. It is classified as a national historic object. The instrument was entirely reconstructed in 1868–1869 by Aristide Cavaillé-Coll

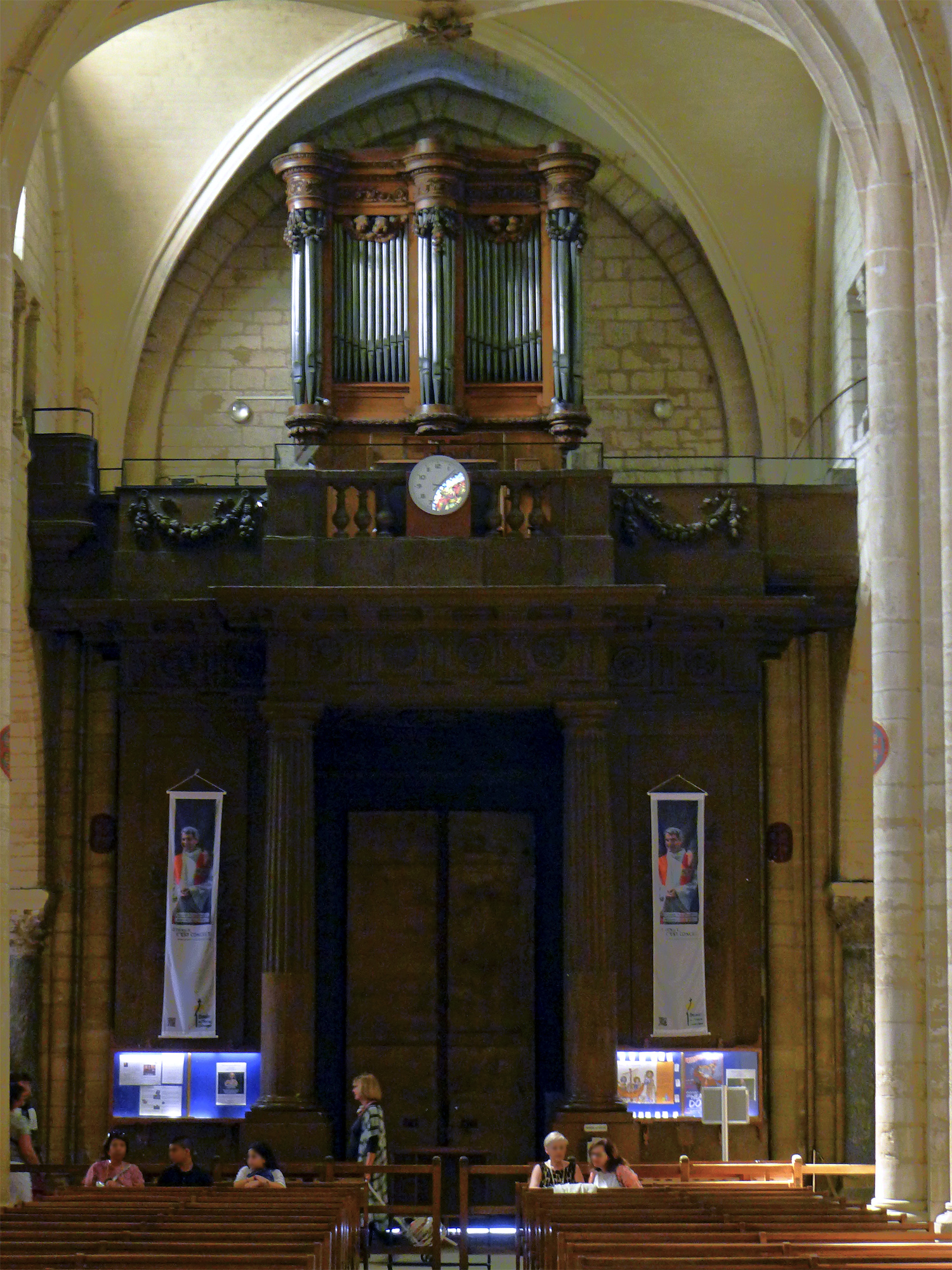
The organ installed over the west portal

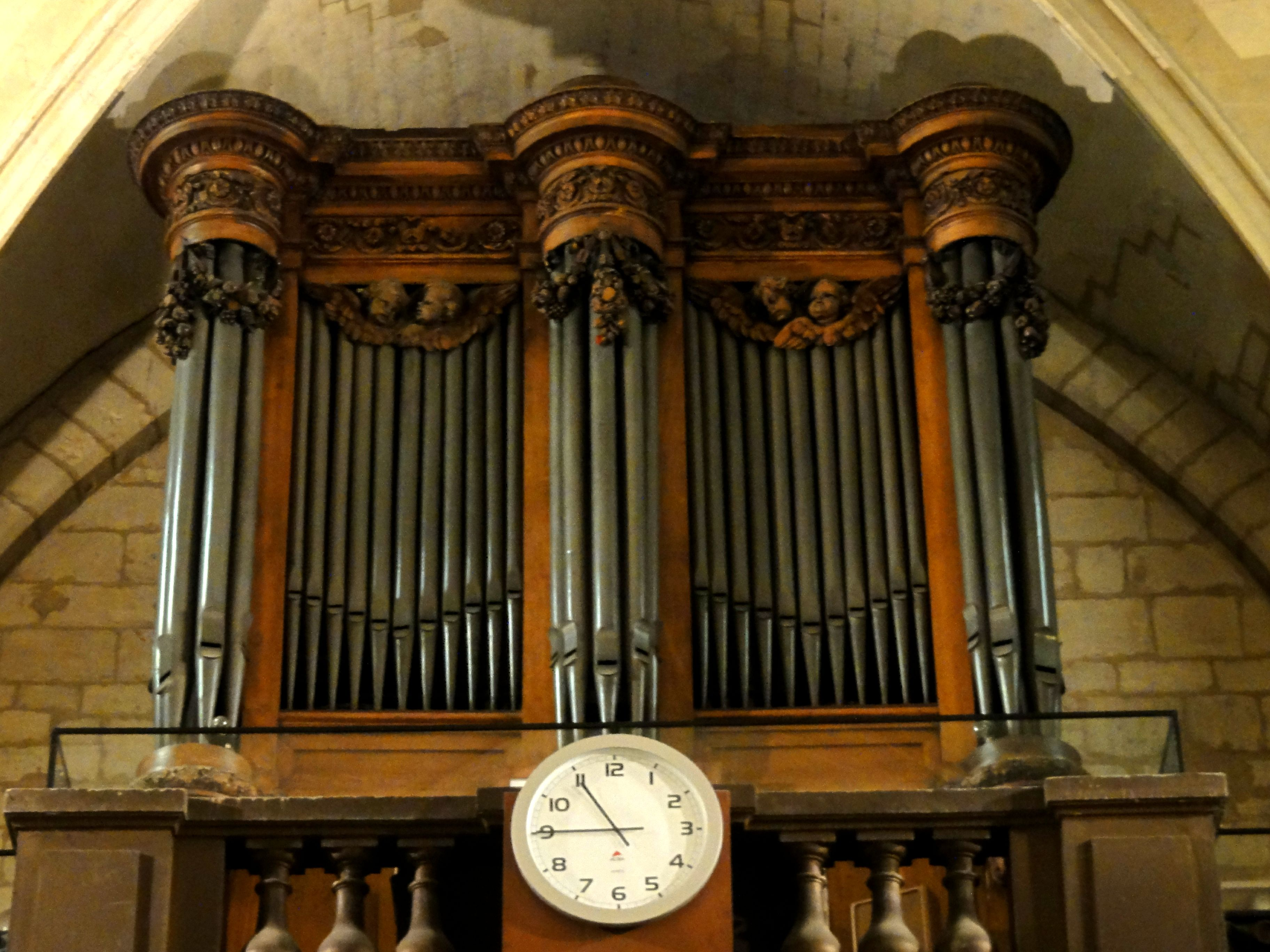
The case of the organ

== Burials ==
- Adelaide of Maurienne

== See also ==
- Martyrium of Saint Denis, Montmartre
- Église de Saint-Germain-des-Prés
- List of historic churches in Paris

== Bibliography (in French) ==
- Dumoulin, Aline; Ardisson, Alexandra; Maingard, Jérôme; Antonello, Murielle; Églises de Paris (2010), Éditions Massin, Issy-Les-Moulineaux, ISBN 978-2-7072-0683-1
- Hillairet, Jacques; Connaissance du Vieux Paris; (2017); Éditions Payot-Rivages, Paris; (in French). ISBN 978-2-2289-1911-1
