= Marie, Duchess of Montpensier =

Marie
- Duchess of Orléans; Duchess of Montpensier
- Born: 15 October 1605; Château de Gaillon, Gaillon, France
- Died: 4 June 1627 (aged 21); Palais du Louvre, Paris, France
- Burial: Royal Basilica of Saint Denis, Paris, France
- Spouse: Gaston, Duke of Orléans
- Issue: Anne Marie Louise, Duchess of Montpensier
- House: Bourbon-Montpensier
- Father: Henri, Duke of Montpensier
- Mother: Henriette Catherine de Joyeuse

Marie (15 October 1605 – 4 June 1627), Duchess of Montpensier, Princess of Dombes and Duchess of Orléans by marriage, was a French noblewoman and one of the last members of the House of Bourbon-Montpensier. Her parents were Henri, Duke of Montpensier and Henriette Catherine de Joyeuse, Duchess of Joyeuse in her own right.

== Biography ==
Marie was born in the château de Gaillon, in Gaillon (Eure department of France), in the former province of Normandy.

Known as Mademoiselle de Montpensier before her marriage, she was the Duke and Duchess of Montpensier's only child. At the age of two, she had been engaged to the second son of Henry IV of France, Nicolas Henri de France, Duke of Orléans, but he died at the age of four in 1611. She was then betrothed to his brother, Gaston, Duke of Orléans, the younger brother of King Louis XIII, and the heir presumptive to the throne of France.

At the death of her father, in 1608, Marie became the Duchess of Montpensier in her own right; the Duchy was one of the oldest in France having been elevated from a County in 1539. Marie was a descendant of John II of France, of the House of Valois and of Saint Louis.

Because of the Montpensier fortune, of which Marie was the only heiress, and despite the aversion shown by Gaston toward this arranged marriage, Louis XIII and Richelieu were determined the marriage would take place.

The wedding ceremony was celebrated in Nantes, on 6 August 1626, in the presence of Louis XIII, his wife, Queen Anne of Austria, and Marie de' Medici, the Queen Mother. According to her daughter's biographer, Vita Sackville-West, quoting a member of her husband's household, A sadder wedding was never seen..

From this union, the new ducal couple had one child:

- Anne Marie Louise d'Orléans, Duchess of Montpensier (Louvre, 29 May 1627 – Palais du Luxembourg, 3 April 1693), the future Grande Mademoiselle.

Marie died on 4 June 1627 at the Palais du Louvre in Paris, at the age of twenty-one, shortly after the birth of her daughter who, as her only child, inherited her fortune and titles. She was buried at the Royal Basilica of Saint Denis, north of Paris.

In a will intended to disinherit her niece, Anne Marie Louise d'Orléans, Marie's half-sister Marie de Lorraine,) chose Charles François de Stainville as beneficiary in 1688; but on the urging of her heirs, the will was broken by the Parlement of Paris in 1689.

After the death of her daughter, La Grande Mademoiselle, in 1693, Marie's fortune was handed over to Philippe de France, Louis XIV's younger and only brother.

== Ancestors ==
Ancestors of Marie, Duchess of Montpensier

8. Louis, Duke of Montpensier
4. François, Duke of Montpensier
9. Jacqueline de Longwy, Countess of Bar-sur-Seine
2. Henri, Duke of Montpensier
10. Nicolas d'Anjou-Mézières, Marquis of Mézières
5. Renée d'Anjou, Marquise de Mézières
11. Gabrielle de Mareuil
1. Marie, Duchess of Montpensier
12. Guillaume, Viscount of Joyeuse
6. Henri, Duke of Joyeuse
13. Marie de Bartanay
3. Henriette Catherine, Duchess of Joyeuse
14. Jean de Nogaret, Lord of La Valette
7. Catherine de Nogaret de La Valette
15. Jeanne de Saint-Lary de Bellegarde
