= Duke of Joyeuse =

The Duchy of Joyeuse was created in 1581 by King Henry III of France for his favourite Anne de Joyeuse.

== Origins ==
The lordship of Joyeuse, named for the town of Joyeuse, Ardèche, came, in the 13th century, into the possession of the house of Châteauneuf-Randon, and was made into a viscountship in 1432. Guillaume, viscount of Joyeuse, was bishop of Alet, but afterwards left the church, and became a Marshal of France; he died in 1592. Anne de Joyeuse was his eldest son.

== House of Joyeuse ==

- 1581–1587 : Anne de Joyeuse (1560–1587), son of Guillaume de Joyeuse and Marie de Batarnay.
- 1587–1592 : Antoine Scipion de Joyeuse (1565–1592), brother of the above.
- 1592–1608 : Henri de Joyeuse (1563–1608), brother of the above.
- 1608–1615 : cardinal François de Joyeuse (1562–1615), archbishop of Toulouse and Rouen, brother of the above.
- 1615–1647 : Henriette Catherine de Joyeuse (1585–1656), daughter of Henri de Joyeuse.

Henriette Catherine married twice: first to the vastly wealthy Henri de Bourbon, Duke of Montpensier; then to Charles de Lorraine, Duke of Guise. From her first marriage, she was the maternal grandmother of la Grande Mademoiselle. In 1647, Henriette Catherine gave the duchy to her son Louis de Lorraine.

== House of Guise ==

- 1647–1654 : Louis de Lorraine (1622–1654), son of Henriette Catherine de Joyeuse.

married Marie Françoise de Valois, duchesse d'Angoulême, daughter of Louis Emmanuel, Duke of Angoulême, who succeeded her father in 1653.

- 1654–1671 : Louis Joseph de Lorraine (1650–1671), Duke of Guise and Joyeuse, son of the above.

married Élisabeth Marguerite d'Orléans, first cousin of Louis XIV.

- 1671–1675 : Francis Joseph de Lorraine, Duke of Guise and Joyesue, son of the above.
- 1675–1688 : Marie de Lorraine, Duchess of Guise, Princess of Joinville, daughter of Charles and Henriette Catherine of Joyeuse.

Without any heirs, Marie ceded the duchy of Joyeuse to her third cousin once removed Charles François de Lorraine in 1688.

== Branch of Elbeuf ==
- 1688–1690 : Charles François de Lorraine (1661–1702), Prince of Commercy, grandson of Charles II, Duke of Elbeuf and nephew of the previous.

1690–1693 : Louis XIV confiscated the duchy after Charles François entered into the service of Leopold I, Holy Roman Emperor. It was given to Charles François' brother Jean Paul.

- 1693–1693 : Jean Paul de Lorraine (1672–1693), Prince of Lillebonne, brother of the above, died without issue.
- 1693–1694 : François Marie de Lorraine (1624–1694), Prince of Lillebonne, Duke of Joyeuse, father of the above and youngest son of Charles II, Duke of Elbeuf.
- 1694–1714 : Anne de Lorraine (1639–1720), wife of the above, daughter of Charles IV, Duke of Lorraine. The duchy was transmitted to the grandson of François Marie and Anne, Louis de Melun, who was created Duke of Joyesue in 1714.

== House of Melun ==
- 1714–1724 : Louis de Melun, Prince of Epinoy, Baron of Antoing then Duke of Joyeuse. Son of Louis de Melun and Élisabeth Thérèse de Lorraine. Élisabeth Thérèse, Princess of Epinoy, was the daughter of the previous duke and duchess of Joyeuse.

He married Armande de La Tour d'Auvergne and had no issue; married Marie Anne de Bourbon secretly and had no issue.
At his death, the title passed to his nephew Charles de Rohan (1715–1787), son of Jules de Rohan, prince de Soubise and Anne Julie de Melun, sister of Louis.
