= 1596 Assembly of Notables =

1596 Political assembly of French grandees

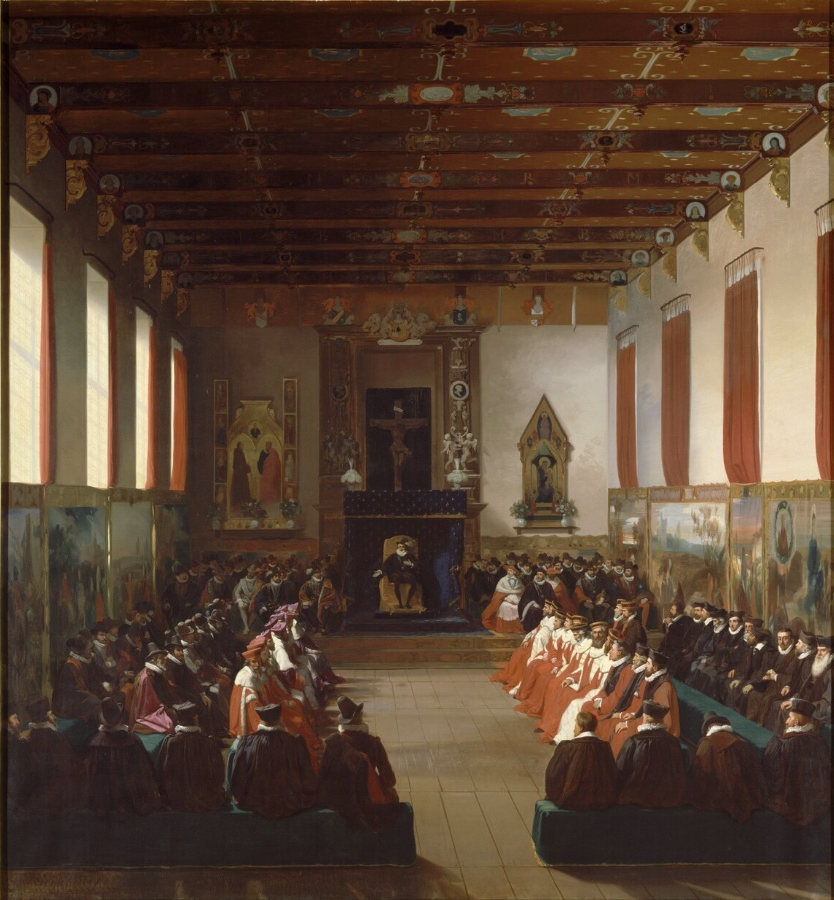
1596 Assembly of Notables during its opening session on 4 November

The 1596 Assembly of Notables (French: Assemblée des notables de 1596) was a gathering of many important French nobles, prelates, financial officials and urban grandees. They were called together in the hopes that they could provide a solution to the fiscal crisis on which king Henri IV found himself. By 1596, France's fiscal condition was dire, with an annual deficit of roughly 18,000,000 livres (pounds) and many of the king's revenues alienated from him. His main financial advisers, embodied by the conseil des finances (council of finances) found themselves overwhelmed by the situation. The principal fiscal expert on this conseil, Pomponne de Bellièvre proposed to Henri that the best remedy to secure the appropriate mandate for the remedies he hoped to implement would be to convene an Assembly of Notables.

Henri, consumed by the military crisis of the war with España accepted Bellièvre's proposal. Bellièvre prepared a broad package of measures for the consideration of the delegates, combining fiscal austerity with a redistribution of the kingdoms tax burden from the countryside to the towns. The Assembly opened in Rouen on 4 November with between 80 and 94 delegates in attendance. The deliberations were divided into three chambers. The delegates were shocked to learn about the crown's expenditure and proposals and resolved to work to verify the various records they were presented with. By early December the Assembly was close to collapse, and the king departed from Rouen for a few weeks. His ministers took the initiative to push the notables towards several proposals for increasing royal revenues. In mid January Henri (who had returned) proposed to the notables the introduction of a 5% sales tax on goods entering into towns (which would be known as the pancarte). Though initially hesitant the notables agreed to endorse this measure. On 28 January the assembly was drawn to a close, and the notables presented their recommendations to the king. They offered a direct cash grant to the crown, curtailing exemptions to the taille (land tax), both cutting and suspending royal incomes, the curtailing of venal office and endorsed the pancarte among other recommendations. The royal council began introducing legislation based on some of their recommendations, however in March a new military crisis rocked the kingdom with the Spanish capture of Amiens. A new impetus for fiscal expedients was thus created, and Henri once more turned to fiscal shortcuts that the Assembly had deplored (such as venal office). The pancarte was put into force in April over much opposition but would deliver far lower revenues than anticipated and would be abolished in 1602. In response to criticism from Paris and the parlements, Henri created several new fiscal councils embodying Bellièvre's proposal for the Assembly. They would last only a couple of months before the king abolished them. As 1597 continued, Henri turned away from the minister whose program the Assembly embodied, Bellièvre, towards the baron de Rosny whose ruthless financial policy and lack of interest in 'proper process' appealed to Henri's needs.

== Financial crisis ==
=== Conseil des finances ===
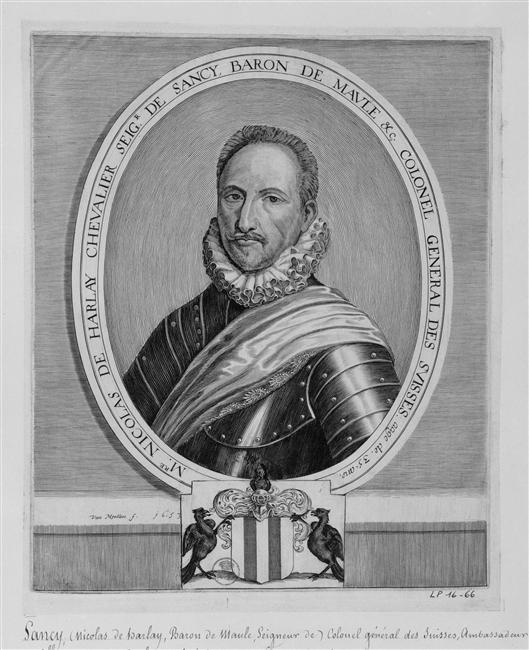
Seigneur de Sancay, one of the principal members of the conseil des finances

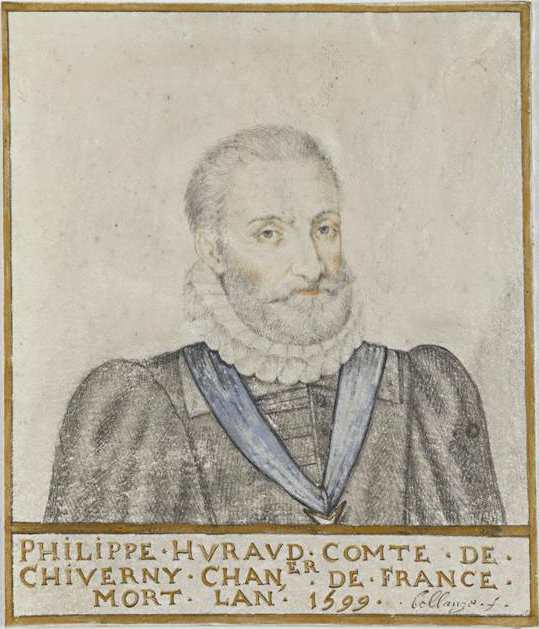
Comte de Cheverny chancelier of France and member of the conseil des finances

Upon the death of Henri III, the role of surintendant des finances (superintendent of the finances) was held by the king's favourite D'O who had been appointed to the charge in 1588. When he died on 24 October 1594, Henri IV abolished the post. In its place was created a conseil des finances composed of nine men. These were the duc de Nevers (duke of Nevers) (who having served briefly as chair of the council, died in 1595); maréchal de Retz (marshal of Retz); connétable de Montmorency (constable of Montmorency); the comte de Cheverny who was the chancelier (chancellor); the comte de Nanteuil (count of Nanteuil) and seigneur de Sancy who had both raised money and soldiers for Henri in the Holy Roman Empire; the royal sécretaires d'État (secretaries of state) the seigneur de Fresnes and the seigneur de La Grange-le-Roy; and finally the only financial expert on the council, Bellièvre who had preceded d'O as Henri III's surintendant des finances. This conseil was responsible for setting the brevet de la taille (the sum to be collected for the taille in a given year - the land tax) by September of the year and for drawing up the statements on revenue and expenditure.

Of these men, the king Henri IV's favourite in financial matters from May 1595 to June 1598 was the seigneur de Sancay. In the public eye it was he who controlled the royal finances. Sancay had, in 1589, secured the support for Henri of an army he had raised for the king's predecessor in the Alte Eidgenossenschaft (Old Swiss Confederacy) while Henri was still Protestant. The historian Major argues he might have even succeeded d'O as the surintendant des finances if he had avoided having a poor relationship with Henri's mistress the marquise de Montceaux.

Bellièvre was absent from his place on the conseil until 1595 as he was occupied in the formally Catholic Ligue (League) held city of Lyon re-establishing the crown's authority.

The conseil des finances attempted a large array of methods to secure funds for the king. They created new fiscal offices, sold off noble titles and what remained of the royal domain (parts of the kingdom directly owned by the crown), they floated new loans and taxes on the towns. They also looked to conduct investigations into false exemptions from the taille (the principle land tax). They ordered an investigation into the alienations (selling off or renting out) of the domain, and attempted to regulate tax collection. For the latter, the trésoriers généraux (generals of the treasury) were ordered to draw up statements as concerned the extraordinary levies they had raised, and to inventory all the royal officials in their généralité (generalities - financial administrative divisions of the kingdom).

Henri quickly lost the enthusiasm he had for his new conseil des finances. The needs of the war he was waging necessitated money that the conseil proved unable to provide him. This infuriated the king. For example, during the conduct of the siege of La Fère (a town which had been sold to the kingdom of España by the ligueur (leaguer) the duc d'Aumale), Henri wrote to the conseil informing them that he needed immediate funds to pay for the income of his infantry and Swiss soldiers. Instead they turned to the bankers of Paris to solve the problem. A little while later Henri requested the provision of 30,000 écus (crowns) within eight days. Bellièvre wrote back that he and the other members of the conseil were working hard to ensure the expenses of the army were met. Henri complained bitterly to the baron de Rosny that while his larder was bare and his clothes torn, his financiers and treasurers "let me die of hunger while they sit at well-laden and stocked tables".

=== Military situation in 1595 ===
In 1595 Henri had decisively crushed the Catholic ligue and Spanish force in Bourgogne at the battle of Fontaine-Française, he had then invaded the Franche-Comté and subjected it to pillage. While the ligueur duc de Mercœur had yet to submit, holding up in Bretagne as an agent of the king of España, the submission of the majority of the French ligueur leadership to Henri left the war he was waging as largely an international one against España. The Spanish responded to this setback in Bourgogne by invading Picardie. The conde de Fuentes (count of Fuentes) put Doullens to siege with 14,000 men, and crushed the royalist relief army under the duc de Bouillon. Doullens surrendered to him on 31 July 1595. Meanwhile, the French held city of Cambrai, governed by the seigneur de Balagny threw off his government and betrayed the city to the Spanish. Henri was able to recapture La Fère in May 1596, and by this means close the road between Spanish Vlaanderen and Paris however a month previous Calais had been taken by the former ligueur; the baron de Rosne (not to be confused with the baron de Rosny) who was now in Spanish employ. The recapture of La Fère was both long and expensive. This developing military crisis in Picardie furthered the fiscal one.

=== State of the books ===
The crowns debts were by 1596 enormous. The receivables owed totalling around 90,000,000 livres (pounds), while the total debt of the crown was somewhere around 200,000,000 livres. This was an unprecedented level of debt for the kingdom. For the Swiss soldiers in his employ alone, Henri owed 36,000,000 livres on their wages and pensions. This was against a state income in 1595 of 28,000,000 livres. By Bellièvre's estimate, 24,000,000 of the state revenues of 30,900,000 livres were assigned. The deficit in this analysis equalled 18,000,000 livres. In addition to this Henri lacked enjoyment of revenues from around 1/5 of the kingdom, and of those parts he theoretically enjoyed, much slipped away to the corruption of officials. In the treasury Henri could not even count on 25,000 écus. In part these debts were induced by the large sums Henri had afforded to former leaders of the Catholic ligue to end their war against him, with the duc de Lorraine receiving 2,700,000 livres, the duc de Mayenne receiving 2,460,000 livres and the duc de Guise receiving 1,888,500 livres among many other figures. Major offers a figure of around 24,000,000 for the purchase of the loyalty of various figures to Henri's cause. In addition to the sums given to the leading ligueur princes, sums were also given to the ligueur aligned towns to secure their reduction into royal obedience. Many of the towns insisted on the confirmation of their privileges to be exempted from taxation as conditions for their return to the king.

Henri had several foreign backers of prominence who had advanced him large sums: queen Elizabeth of England had loaned him 3,400,000 livres, the granduca di Toscana (grand duke of Toscana) had loaned him 3,500,000 livres and the fürst von Anhalt (prince of Anhalt) had afforded him 3,200,000 livres. The combination of his conversion to Catholicism (which alienated many of his foreign Protestant backers), and the proximity of many of the foreign Catholic princes of Europe to the kingdom with which he was at war: España, made the securing of further financial relief through foreign aid challenging.

=== Seeking a path to solvency ===
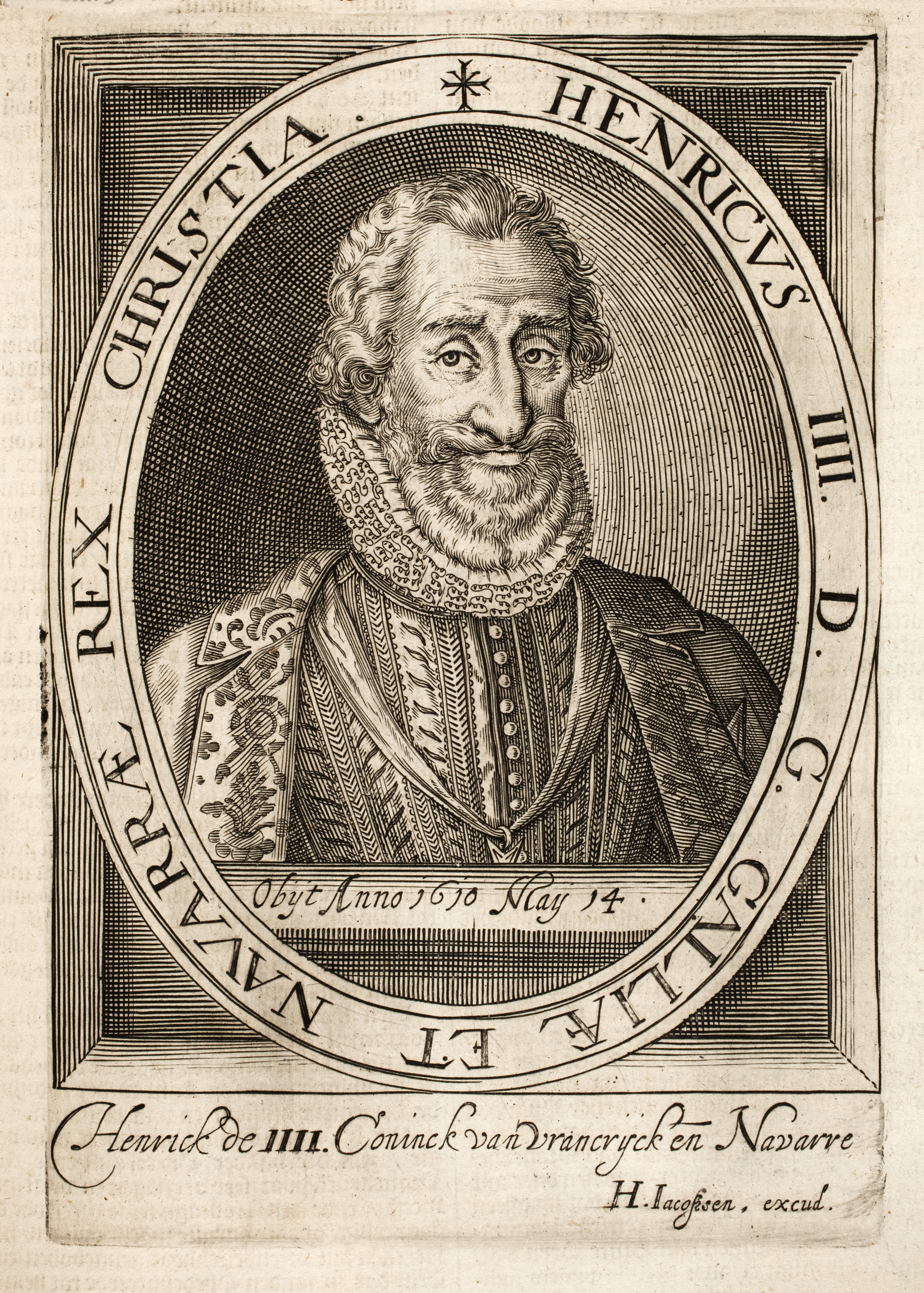
Henri IV, king of France during the military and financial crisis of the 1590s

The premier président (first president) of the chambre des comptes (court of accounts) advised Henri in February 1595 that the king was being too generous with his gifts, that the local governments of the kingdom were abusing their fiscal powers and that Henri was creating long-term problems (the payment of salaries) via the short term expedient of selling offices off. Various means of financial remedy were attempted in 1595 without success. His former Protestant allies had lost their enthusiasm for forwarding him money, his tax collectors were attacked by the people, the parlement of Paris rejected attempts to lower the interest on rentiers (receivers of government bonds) and the cour des aides (court of aids - held jurisdiction over custom duties and some other financial matters) blocked a tax on walled cities.

While traditionally the raising of taxes would have been turned to as a resolution to such a fiscal problem, this was a challenging proposition during the 1590s. France had been rocked by the rebellion of the Croquants (a large scale peasant uprising) whose chief complaint was that of excessive fiscal exaction. Indeed, in one Norman village in 1596 the residents were accused of attacking and killing the armed guards that accompanied the tax collectors. As a result of troubles such as these around an eighth of Henri's surviving decrees for 1594 were to grant reductions, exemptions and relief from arrears of taxation to various regions and towns. Such royal decrees would continue in 1595 and 1596, though in a reduced number (this may reflect a poor survival of the records for these years).

Where taxes were raised, it was sometimes done without the consent of the provincial Estates (regional representative bodies). This was the case in Bretagne in 1593 where a tax was raised over the remonstrance of the Estates. Similarly in Normandie in 1595, the provincial Estates were not even summoned to offer their approval of the taxes that were raised.

Henri had also looked to the creation of noble titles as a source of income. One edict in 1594 created twenty-four nobles in the jurisdiction of the parlement of Paris, while one of 1595 created 60 new noble titles in Normandie. The cour des aides of Rouen was hesitant to approve of this creation, but was informed by the crown that its registration was a necessity to raise funds for the war.

The traditional expedients of the creation of venal offices and the alienation of the royal domain had also been turned to. For example, in February 1594, 600,000 livres of the royal domain under the jurisdiction of the parlement of Paris (the parlement was the most senior of the sovereign courts) was alienated, and twenty two edicts creating various offices. The sovereign courts often baulked at the alienations of the royal domain and had to be compelled to register the edicts.

The various methods employed by the crown often had short term benefits with long-term financial costs. While the alienation of the royal domain provided immediate cash, it reduced royal revenues long term, the sale of office created new incomes the king would have to pay as well as being attached to various tax exemptions and allowing their holders to gorge the people for revenues, the loans the crown had taken often had high interest rates, and ennoblement led to tax exemptions in the long term. Henri's methods also brought a great amount of friction between him and the various bodies such as the cours des aides the parlements and the chambres des comptes, all of whom had to have their objections overridden. As a result of these disputes, Henri was increasingly drawn towards the idea of an absolutist conception of monarchy.

=== Return of Bellièvre ===
Shortly after Bellièvre's return to the conseil des finances on 26 March 1596, the body recommended to Henri that nine of the investigatory commission the crown had created be abolished on the grounds that they were presently more of a burden on the people than the regular taxation was.

An attempt to institute a doubling of the tax on wine and a tax on merchandise entering towns was blocked by the city of Paris and the cour des aides. Had it come to pass, it would have been administered by a conseil particulier composed of members of the noblesse de robe (nobles of the robe).

On 21 April, the chancelier Cheverny and Bellièvre proposed a reduction in the interest rates on rentes (government bonds) from 8.33% to 6.66% which offered a saving to the crown of 600,000 livres per year. It was likely such a proposal would have encountered vigorous opposition.

== Reaching towards the Assembly ==
=== Assembly or Estates? ===
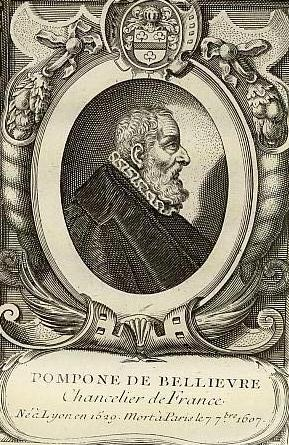
Bellièvre, former surintendant des finances and leading financial expert on the conseil des finances, architect of the decision to call an Assembly of Notables

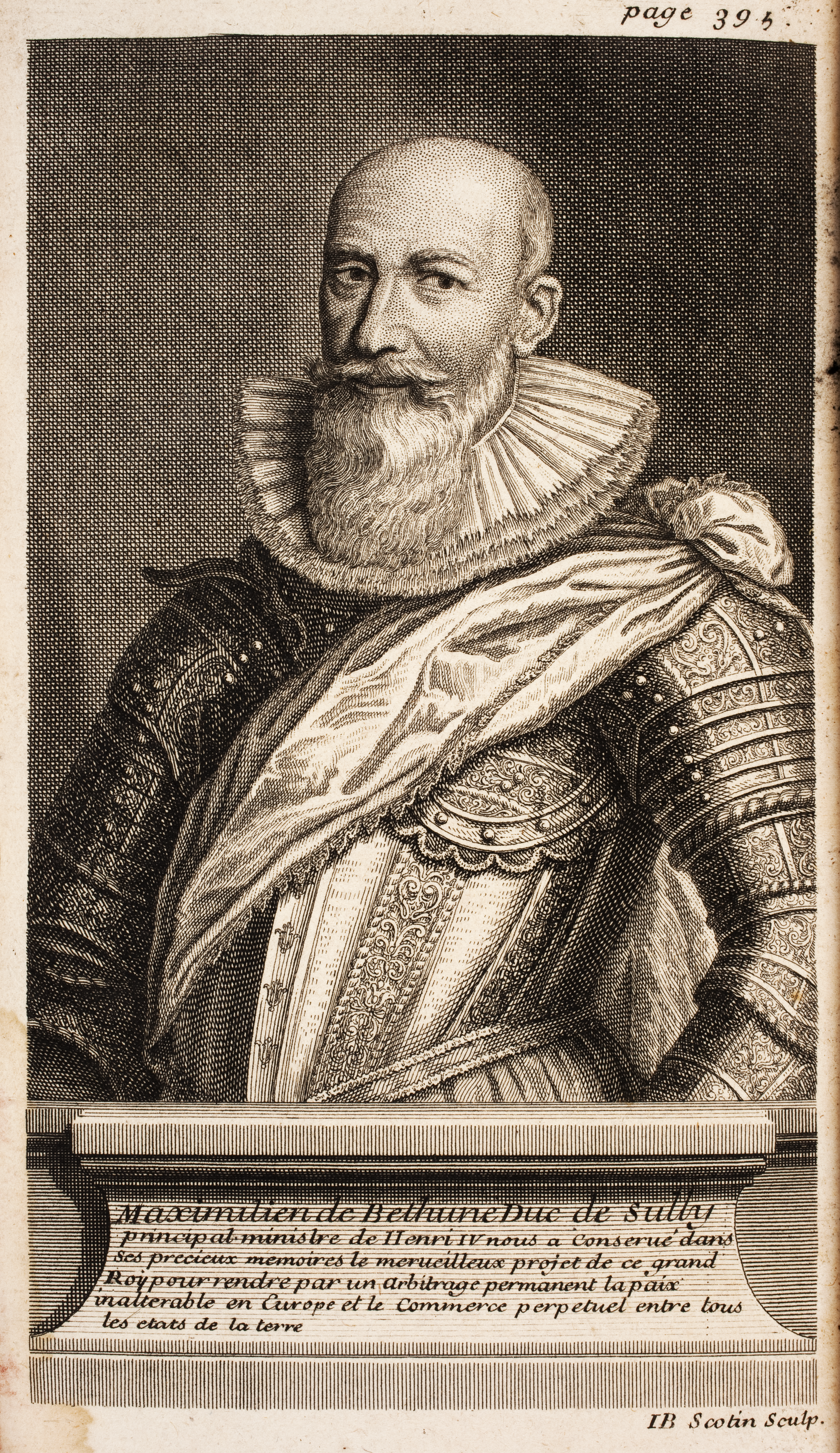
Baron de Rosny a royal official at first inexperienced in finance but who would win the affections of Henri in fiscal matters in 1596 and supplant Bellièvre by 1598

With the king's creditors exhausted, and Henri's relationship with the Estates poor, Bellièvre proposed that rather than concede to a need to call an Estates General, that Henri utilise a method the crown had used at the start of the troubles in the kingdom, an Assembly of Notables. Indeed, his first proposal to the king to this effect came 15 March before he had even returned to the conseil des finances. This proposal was initially intended to satiate the desire of the clergy to see the adoption of the recommendations of the Council of Trent (something he hoped to parry using such a body). Receiving approval from the king, Henri announced such a council would be held to the clergy on 7 April 1596. According to the baron de Rosny, in correspondence the baron received from the king on 15 April the character of the proposed Assembly had already shifted from one concerned with church affairs to one orientated around financial matters.

During this period the members of the conseil des finances were divided between those in Paris and those with the king in Picardie on campaign. In his letters back to Paris, Henri pleaded for money, and made little mention of ecclesiastical matters or the Assembly of Notables. The king found his patience with Bellièvre and the council greatly tested by their failures to provide him with what he needed, especially when he began to suspect it was their concerns of proper process that were holding back funds from him. On 29 April, Bellièvre again indicated that an Assembly of Notables would be the ideal method by which to gain the money to support his campaigns. Later, on 26 June he explained to Henri that the people could bear no more tax burden, and thus an Assembly was necessary to find the way forward for the king. He suggested the body meet on 15 August and indicated in his next correspondence he would suggest whom to invite.

Bellièvre's correspondence reached Henri while he was residing at Abbeville. The king's situation was desperate, he was in the process of making the Swiss cantons aware that he could not fulfil the payment of their soldiers incomes that he owed them. Though he was ill inclined to do so, Henri was compelled to convene an assembly so that he could gain the resources required to bring his war with España to a close. In additional to the financial impetus to call a body together, the crown also desired to redress the broader economic troubles of the kingdom.

Bellièvre's view on bodies such as the Assembly of Notables contrasted sharply with that of the baron de Rosny who saw both the Assembly and the Estates General as pointless institutions. This would be the first meeting of such an assembly that bore the name 'Assembly of Notables' at the time of its convocation, according to the baron de Rosny.

The advantage of an Assembly of Notables over an Estates General was that it allowed Henri to invite whoever he saw fit, and end the Assembly at his discretion. It also suited more his authoritarian tendencies, and avoided the delays and weak results that previous Estates Generals had been troubled by. In the previous Estates Generals' of the French Wars of Religion, the crown had encountered difficulty securing the support of the elected representatives. This distaste of Henri's for the representative body of the Estates was shared by many on his conseils. Despite this, Henri had promised shortly after his accession in 1589 to convene an Estates General, to win over Henri III's Catholic supporters, however it had been continually put off supposedly due to the military situation. This was an embarrassing situation for the king and he would mention his willingness to undertake an Estates General again in the convocation letters for the Assembly of Notables. The failure to do so now was again explained as a product of the military situation in the kingdom.

The king chose for the Assembly to imitate the construction of the Estates General. The notables would be chosen by the three orders (First Estate - clergy, Second Estate - nobility, Third Estate - commons), and would enjoy the same powers as members of the Estates would have had. The contemporary Protestant historian Aubigné described the meeting as a petit Estats (little Estates).

=== Summoning of the Assembly ===
Orders of convocation were issued on 25 and 26 July 1596, with the intention that the Assembly was to meet at Compiègne on 31 August. The proximity of the time of the Assembly to the date of its being called precluded the possibility of the widespread the kind of provincial surveys that had been undertaken for the 1583 Assembly of Notables. This would later be delayed for a 30 September start and relocated to the more distant Rouen after the outbreak of plague in Paris. In his letters of summons Henri declared his intention to find money where it could not be sourced from the existing finances and to gain assistance in the raising of an army so that the enemies of the kingdom might be halted from ravaging the countryside and cities. He assured the notables that he would apply whatever reforms they proposed and show them good will. Mariéjol interprets this rhetoric as a sign of his desperation. Henri characterised the problems he experienced as a legacy of his predecessors, denying any role his administration might have had in causing the financial troubles. In the same month, July, he imposed the baron de Rosny on the conseil des finances. His placement on the conseil was designed to enforce Henri's will over the body and serve as an intermediary between the king and the comte de Nanteuil, Sancay and Bellièvre.

=== Cahiers ===
Some of the representatives who came for the assembly drew up cahiers (books of grievances). The deputy from Tours was tasked by those of the city with asking for the convocation of an Estates General on the grounds that the broader election would better be able to advise the king. The representatives were to refused any new taxes on Tours and plead the poverty of the people of Tours if a loan on their city was proposed. High prices were the fault of taxes on goods entering Tours. A reduction in the taille was requested to the levels it had been in 1582 (many people in Tours owned land outside the city). Those taxes that were levied should be verified by the sovereign courts. It was requested that the clergy and office holders no longer be exempted from municipal taxation. Further that nobles not intervene to protect their domestic servants from paying the taille. Instead of taxes, the crown could resolve its financial problems in the mind of the representatives from Tours by eliminating corruption, reducing the number of royal offices to those which had been present during the reign of Henri II and fiscal austerity. If it was not possible to compensate the office holders deprived of their incomes, then instead the office should be terminated on the holders death. Where non walled towns and villages had raised fortifications they asked that these be destroyed.

The cahiers of Lyon presented an apocalyptic picture of the city, racked by plague the legacy of the Protestant uprising of 1562 and its role as a 'frontier city'. The Lyonnais population had provided great sums to the king, such that they had fallen into debt. They suggested a reduction in the size of royal garrisons, a curtailing of the number of royal officials and putting the crowns finances in order.

At the same time as the Assembly was about to convene, the Protestants were meeting at Loudun in southern France. They resolved in October to dispatch six deputies to meet with both the royal court, and with the Assembly of Notables, so that they might secure negotiations between themselves and the king. They returned south to their compatriots on 16 January 1597, prior to the end of the Assembly.

The final surviving cahiers come from the three estates of the Loudunois which were prepared to be presented to the notables around a month after the start of the Assembly. In these cahiers a general internal peace was requested in which both Protestantism and Catholicism could be freely practiced. While noble privileges were to be respected they requested such men be excluded from holding ecclesiastical benefices. Where nobles had remained on their estates or assaulted the other two orders of the kingdom they should lose their noble status and become subject to the collection of the taille (from which they were traditionally exempt). It was proposed that châteaux be demolished, garrisons withdrawn from the interior of the kingdom such that they were only present on the frontiers and the taille be reduced to the levels of the time of François I. Where the crown had been served by dishonest administrators they were to have their goods seized towards the payment of the crown's debts.

While the cahiers indicated support towards Bellièvre's desired program of austerity, they suggest little enthusiasm for his plans for redistributing taxation towards the cities.

Among the chosen representatives there was a general animus towards the lowering of direct taxation, contraction of the states expenditure and clamping down on corruption.

=== Bellièvre's program ===
Two financial projects were drawn up for the attention of the notables in the conseil des finances. Bellièvre had prepared a package typified by austerity and reorganisation. Meanwhile, the baron de Rosny devised a package of quick expedients.

Bellièvre had by 3 August drawn up his program for the Assembly and persuaded his fellow conseillers to sign onto it. The rapidity of his effort was greatly assisted by his veteran experience.

The two men's approaches varied considerably. Bellièvre first outlined the state of the royal revenues, he estimated them as equalling around 30,900,000 livres of which 24,000,000 livres were alienated from the crown or otherwise assigned contractually. Thus only 6,900,000 livres remained to be used by the government, against a government expenditure of 24,900,000 livres - a deficit of 18,000,000 livres. This was three times the deficit Henri III had been faced with in 1583. Bellièvre then began laying out his stall as to how he would combat this deficit. The budget of the royal household would be cut from 1,500,000 to 1,200,000 livres, royal pensions would be reduced by 600,000 livres and military expenditure by 4,500,000 livres down to 3,600,000 livres for a total saving of 5,400,000 livres. A further 3,180,000 livres would be saved by reducing the interest on the rentes constituées (established bonds) from 8.33% to 6% as he had earlier proposed. This would be justified on the grounds that 5-6% was the appropriate interest rate for 'Christian states', and any higher than that would encourage an idle investor class. Venal offices would be curtailed through the termination of the posts upon the deaths of their current holders - saving around another 3,000,000. The remaining deficit of 6,420,000 livres would be combatted through the more astute management of the tax farms (auctioned off rights to tax collection) and the alienation of the royal domain. Bellièvre estimated there were yields of 4,794,000 livres through the application of this. Improper exemptions from the taille would be suppressed. Finally a new tax on goods being brought into towns would fulfil 2,100,000 livres. This tax was already in effect in Normandie and Paris. After factoring in a few more considerations Bellièvre calculated a budget surplus of 174,000 livres.

This assumed the maintenance of the current tax regimen, however Bellièvre was aware that the simultaneous payment by the population of the taille taillon and crue for a sum of 18,000,000 livres was not sustainable. Bellièvre proposed reducing this tax burden by 3,000,000 livres. This would be counter-balanced by raising an equal tax burden on the walled towns. As for the 24,000,000 livres the crown owed for those years when it had been unable to satisfy the rentes it had failed to pay in prior years. While Bellièvre could not countenance the renouncing of the entire obligation, he suggested the creditors might be amenable to receipt of half. To pay this half, a new rente of 15,000,000 livres would be issued on an interest rate of 6%. This new rente would entail a cost of 900,000 livres a year, but would free the kingdom from the burden of 600,000 livres of interest that it currently owed a year. A final budget deficit of 126,000 thus presented itself, but Bellièvre believed he could identify further economies to eliminate this.

These reforms were drastic, and liable to be unpopular with many constituencies of the kingdom. The nobles would be put out by the reductions in the military budget and pensions, the royal officials by attacks on their offices and incomes, and the urban population by the increase in their tax burden. Bellièvre thus looked to the Assembly to get the appropriate buy in to push this package through. To best sell the package to those it would impact, Bellièvre proposed the division of royal revenues into two portions. One half would remain under the purview of the conseil des finances and would contain the revenues of the taille, taillon, crue and the levies on the 'closed towns'. The money this conseil received could be put towards the king's household and the army. The other half of the revenues would be divorced from control of the king, his courtiers and the nobility. This was to be composed of revenues from the domain, aides (excise taxes), gabelles (the tax on salt) and other tax farms, the décimes (clerical tax) and commerce subsidies was to be placed under the authority of a conseil du bon ordre (council of good order) which would be responsible for the payment of salaries, rentes and other contractual obligations. By this means Bellièvre envisioned that there would be greater assurance of receipt to counter the lower incomes and interest rates that could be expected. There would also be a greater confidence in royal credit through this measure. There was a side effect that it expanded the authority of the noblesse de robe.

He was able to secure buy in from the majority of the conseillers for this program. Despite fears of the impact on royal authority, the conseil du bon ordre had received approval on the conseil by 3 August. The connétable de Montmorency objected to the scale of the cuts to the military, and achieved a majority on the conseil in agreement with him for a proposal to pare back the reductions such that they leaved the military budget at 4,500,000 livres by increasing the tax burden on the towns by a further 900,000 livres.

=== Rosny's program ===
The baron de Rosny proposed a less systematic package mainly orientated around expansion of revenues without curtailing spending. He proposed taxes on playing cards, wheat, flour, pastry shops and tennis courts among other things. He proposed the reintroduction of the crowns rights to a tenth of the revenues generated by mines. Those benefices which laid vacant should be appropriated by the crown. New charges would be levied on the process of becoming a naturalised Frenchman, as well as for towns, comtés and duchés to be assured in their rights. Exemptions from the taille were to be curtailed, similar as to how Bellièvre had proposed. He also championed the lower interest rate rentes in return for the redemption of the alienated royal domain. He desired to clamp down on the importation of cloth so as to stimulate domestic production. Despite this an excise duty would be imposed. He also proposed that the currency be debased. He proposed the abolition of the cour des aides and chambres des comptes, and the seizing of the incomes of officials.

Few of his ideas would be considered particularly seriously by the notables.

=== Commissioners to the provinces ===
In September 1596 five commissioners were sent out across France to secure funds for the crown. It was to be their responsibility to drive the zeal of the généraux des finances and trésoriers (generals of finance and treasurers). One of these commissioners was the baron de Rosny. He operated with far less scruples for the raising of funds than his colleagues and brought back from Orléans and Tours 300,000 écus (or 900,000 livres) in seventy carts, pilfered from the wages of royal officers, money allocated to the payment of rentes and pensions. The members of the sovereign courts in the cour des aides and the trésoriers of Tours whose revenues he had plundered (and in the latter case, removed from their office) strongly protested but without effect. Only several months previous, the trésoriers had been assured their office was for life unless they were reimbursed or somehow forfeited it. Henri was greatly impressed by Rosny's energy and ability to quickly raise funds and rewarded him for his efforts. Despite his pleasure at the acts of Rosny, the baron's revenue hunting had the effect of alienating men Henri could ill afford to lose the support of. Indeed, during the meeting of the Assembly, the prévôt des marchands (provost of the merchants - the mayor of Paris) successfully convinced the notables that Rosny's commission should be revoked.

Henri arrived at Rouen for the Assembly either in late September or early October. He was afforded ceremonial entry into the city on 16 October by the burghers of Rouen. He established himself in the palace of abbot of Saint-Ouen. From there he dealt with matters of precedence between the notables and conducted interviews with them as to the conditions in their provinces and to prepare the way for the success of his designs.

== Assembly ==
The Assembly opened in the city of Rouen on 4 November 1596.

=== Invite list ===
Among the attendees of the Assembly were 80 men which broke down according to Babelon, and Mariéjol as nine members of the clergy, nineteen members of the nobility and fifty two members of the commons (primarily drawn from the sovereign courts of the parlements and the chambre des comptes. According to Jouanna it broke down as eleven bishops, twenty six nobles, twenty four members of the sovereign courts, eighteen trésoriers and representatives from fifteen cities. According to Salmon and Jouanna there were ninety four notables which broke down as being composed of princes, maréchaux and various provincial governors of whom there were twenty six; prelates of whom there were eleven, présidents and procureurs-généraux from the sovereign courts of whom there were twenty four; trésoriers from the généralités of whom there were eighteen; the mayors of provincial towns or if they were otherwise engaged the échevins (alderman) of whom there were fifteen. These were only some of the men invited to the Assembly, and others would turn up as the proceedings progressed.

The invitation of the prelates is explained by Major as a desire to resolve the problem of the church that had been raised earlier in the year, and to secure their buy in for the implementation of the Assemblies resolutions in their diocese. Similar reasoning was used for the inviting of the great nobles and maréchaux who would be able to lead their respective provinces towards the implementation of the decisions. The présidents and procureurs généraux were invited so that they might aid the pushing through of the coming edicts. Meanwhile, the trésoriers généraux who were invited from each généralité would provide the financial records. Finally the representatives of the principal towns were invited as the new tax Bellièvre hoped to impose was to fall on their constituents.

Certain invitees proved troubling for Henri. The recently subdued ligueur leader the duc de Mayenne was invited, as was the notoriously challenging grandee the duc d'Épernon. Both men would accept the invitation and arrive for the Assembly.

=== Breakdown of the attendees ===
For the princes du sang was the prince de Conti.

Among the great nobles were the young duc de Nevers (who had succeeded his father to the title the previous year) and the marquis de La Force a powerful Protestant noble Henri had recently established as governor of Béarn and Navarre and whom he kept at his side so as to best flatter him (thus he rarely attended the sessions).

For the maréchaux were Biron, La Châtre, Matignon and the future maréchal Ornano.

Among the prelates was the archbishop of Rouen.

Where the mayor of a town or the premier président was unable to attend, the organs of the city turned to alternate representatives to dispatch to the king. As de facto representatives of their locality, those chosen by the king sometimes consulted with their colleagues and received instructions from them as to how to proceed. The representatives of the towns were aware that the crown was looking to reorientate the burden of taxation towards them from the countryside, and were prepared to oppose this.

For the towns of France representatives were summoned from the following cities: Paris (the prévôt des marchands - provost of the merchants was instructed to bring an échevin - alderman with him); Rouen (the first échevin was invited and when his successor was chosen during the meeting of the Assembly they were summoned to replace him), Bourges (the mayor was summoned); Bordeaux (maréchal de Matignon was the mayor, and therefore the premier jurat was also invited to offer a more local perspective); Orléans (the city decided an assistant should accompany their mayor); Amiens (the mayor was not informed of the change of location or date but fortunately for the city a former mayor was at court at the time of the Assembly); Troyes (an ėchevin was sent in lieu of mayor who plead his age); Tours (an échevin was sent due to the sickness of the mayor); Dijon (mayor attended who was also a member of the parlement of the city); Lyon (an échevin sent in lieu of the mayor); and Châlons (an échevin sent in lieu of the mayor). The first consuls of Marseille and Aix were also summoned, but there is no record of their arrival in Rouen.

The Dauphinois economist Barthélemy de Laffemas who had been enriched in the fabric trade and who in 1602 would be established as the royal contrôleur général du commerce et des manufactures (controller-general of commerce and manufacturing) would be among the attendees.

=== Opening addresses ===
Henri arrived to win over the deputies alongside his mistress the marquise de Montceaux and the royal court.

In the king's opening address of 4 November, he declared himself willing to be put under the tutelage of the notables in the following of the course of action they prescribed. He contrasted his liberal attitude towards their recommendations with his predecessors, who he argued had sought from the notables a rubber seal by which to impose their will. His speech was very brusque and short, totalling around 250 words in total. His mistress the marquise de Montceaux reproached him for his childish imagery, to which the king responded that he would listen to the notables but with a sword in his hand. Indeed, the historian Salmon argues his offer of 'tutelage' was a disingenuous one.

Henri was followed by the chancelier Cheverny who for around 45 minutes spoke on the dire state of the kingdom and the urgent need of the crown for money. After he had spoken Henri rose and the first session was concluded.

=== Three chambers ===
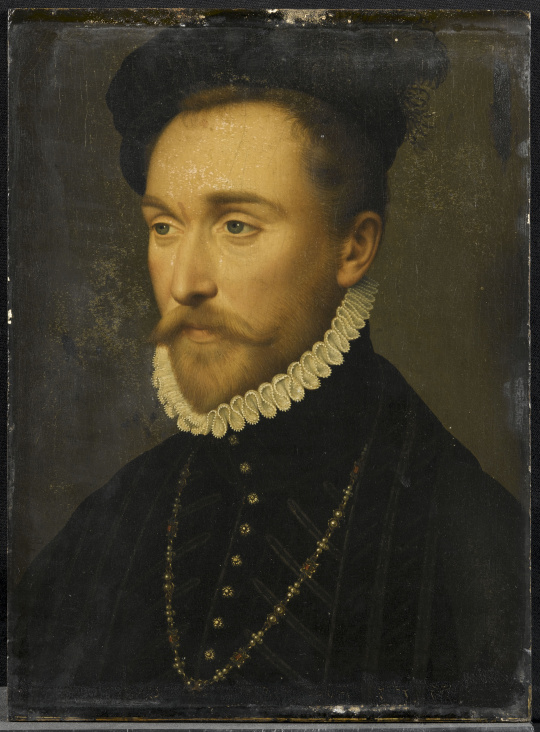
Maréchal de Retz, président of one of the three chambers

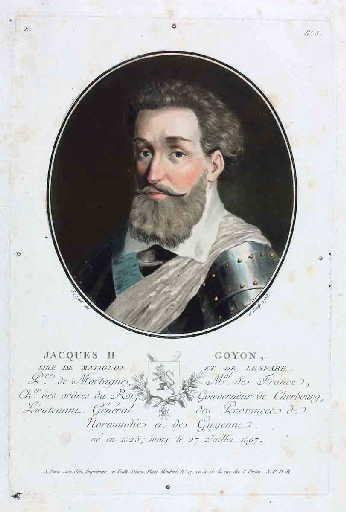
Maréchal de Matignon, président of one of the three chambers

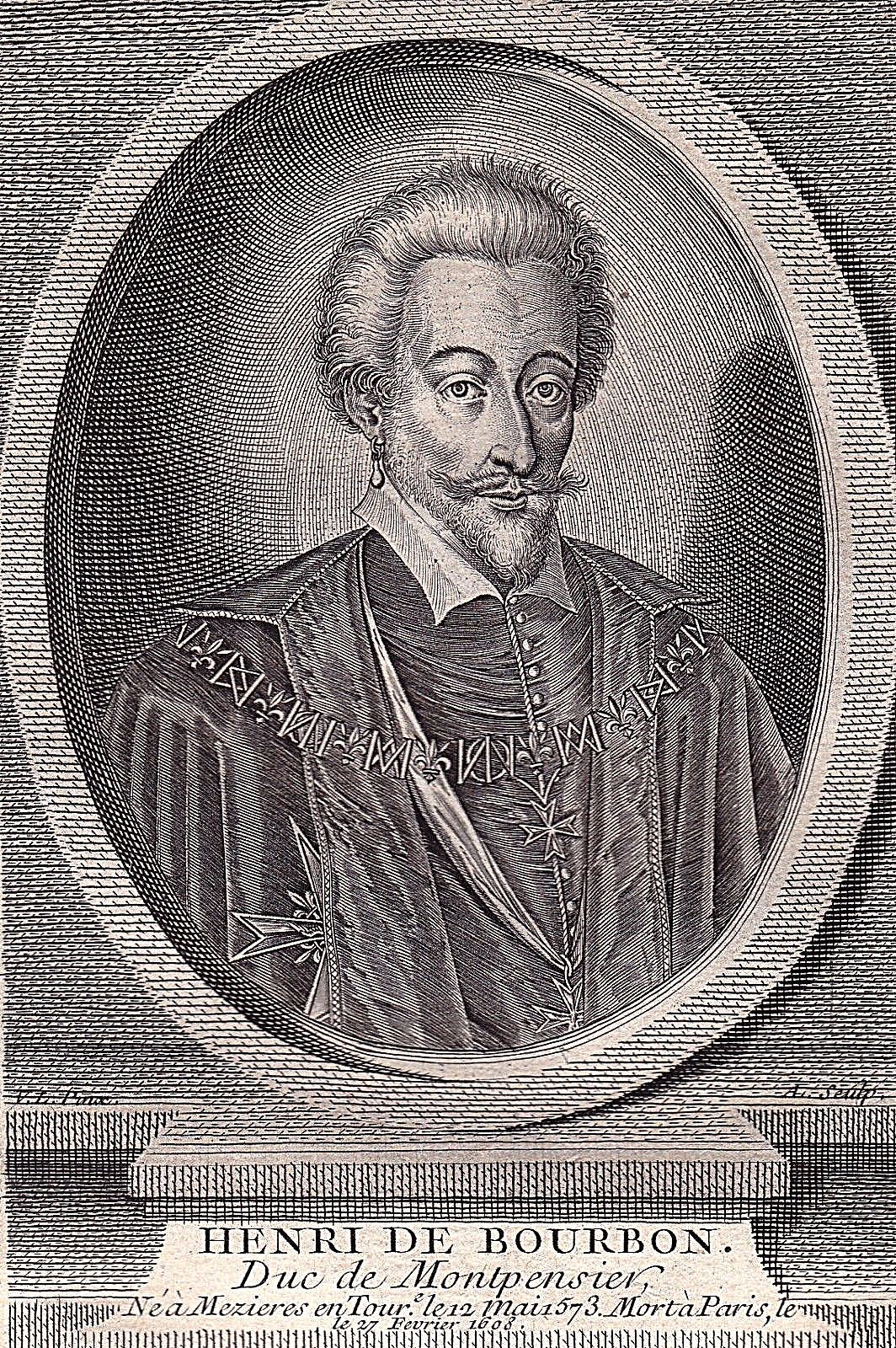
Duc de Montpensier, président of one of three chambers

The following few days were devoted to establishing the deliberate procedure that was to be employed for the Assembly. Bellièvre and the members of the conseil des finances favoured the divisions traditional to the Estates General, one chamber for the clergy, one for the nobility and one for the commons. However, in the end it was resolved to follow the precedent of 1583 where the chambers had consisted of a cross section of all three. According to Rosny this was done at the insistence of the royal officials who feared the nobility would lump them in with the Third Estate. The advantage of dividing proceedings into three chambers was that it allowed every member to voice their opinions without greatly slowing down proceedings.

The deliberations would thus be conducted in three chambers, which were chaired by the veteran maréchal de Retz, the veteran maréchal de Matignon and the young prince du sang (prince of the blood - agnatic relative of the king) the duc de Montpensier. Matignon and Retz were both older than 70 while Montpensier was around 23 years old. Each chamber had a président (above described), a sécretaire and roughly 31 other members. Only the minutes of Montpensier's chamber and the private diary of the parlementaire président Claude Groulart (who was in Matignon's chamber) survive to give us an idea of the course of the discussions.

There would be many joint sessions at which reports would be listened to and general stands made.

The notables consumed many weeks wrangling with one another over matters of precedence and unpicking the contradictions between the general financial report they had received, and that provided by the individual trésoriers. Matters of precedence were particularly of concern to the royal officials among the notables. The trésoriers among the notables became a subject of debate as to whether their presence was as members of the deliberative assembly or simply to give an account of their généralité. One of the parlementaires who was present, named Claude Groulart recounted in his journal of his intervention in a dispute between the duc de Nevers and duc de Montmorency.

=== Early sessions ===
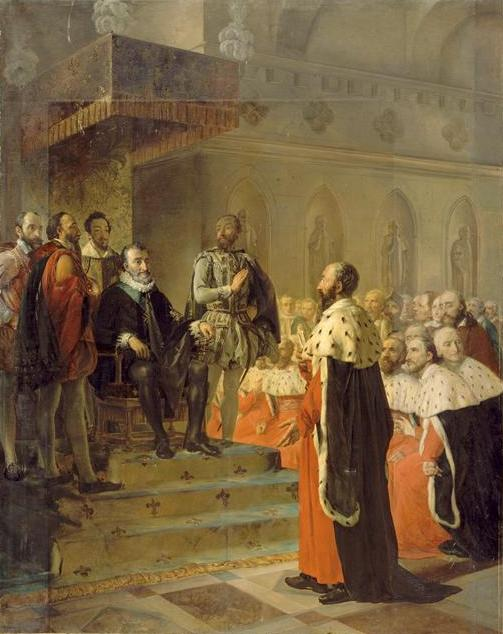
Henri IV seated during the first session of the 1596 Assembly of Notables

On 8 November the first combined session of the chambers was held too hear the reports of the intendants des finances Incarville and Heudicourt outline the fiscal position of the crown. They explained that it would be necessary to establish new venal offices and raise extraordinary taxation. The revelation of this caused the notables to dispatch a delegation to Henri to request the edicts on this matter be delayed. The king retorted that he could not do so given the precarity of his fiscal situation, however he suggested a committee be established by the notables to work with Incarville and Heudicourt to figure out which parts of the extraordinary taxation could be abandoned. By this means any anger at refusal to concede on tax matters was transferred from the king to his officials.

On 12 November, the cardinal de Gondi announced that the committee established as a result of the discussion with Henri on 8 November had engaged with Incarville and Heudicourt and seen the records of taxes raised in each généralite. The figures they had seen in this discussion were divergent with that presented by the trésoriers. As a result of this discordance the Assembly set to work verifying the figures.

The fiscal officials of the crown faced attack on two fronts. They were assaulted with criticism by the notables. When the trésorier Le Gras turned to Henri and his conseillers to complain about the threats they were subject to, Henri offered little reprieve. He left the delegation kneeling throughout their interview with him (something a contemporary described as very rude) and told them that while he was sure some of them served him faithfully, many of their number were guilty of abuses and he would no longer allow his finances to be so poorly administered. It is possible Le Gras and his colleagues also had volatile exchanges with Rosny and members of the royal conseil during their visit to the court.

By 15 November, the parlementaire Achille de Harlay was dispirited by the lack of progress. In his view the crowns financial officials had come to the Assembly insufficiently prepared, the people of the kingdom were suffering from overburdensome tax and it would only be possible to meet the crowns military needs by curtailing the incomes of officials and rentes. In addition to these general problems he was feeling a greater hostility of the king towards him and his parlementaire colleagues due to their failure to verify the king's recent tax edicts. Henri also sought his public backing in front of the notables for a plan to restrict royal officials from involvement in the affairs of great nobles. By this means it would become significantly more difficult for the great nobles to put their fingers on the scales of the affairs of state and engage in the politics of patronage. De Harlay was little enthused to endorse the proposal that might earn him so much ire from the grand nobles.

Many of the notables would have seen the maintenance of royal garrisons in the kingdom's interior as a pointless expense. Henri, who was only recently established in stable power in the kingdom had reason to disagree. The duc de Montpensier defended himself when it was announced the garrison in his château cost almost 18,000 livres by arguing that he wanted the garrison gone himself. The delegate of Amiens was particularly devoted to the avoidance of a garrison in his city.

Revelations followed as to the taxation enjoyed by the duc d'Épernon for his personal benefit in the region of Bordeaux and the practice in Languedoc of taxes raised without royal authority or audit by the provincial and sub-provincial estates - totalling around 210,000 livres. It was charged that this money was then delivered to local governors . Provence experienced similar situations, as well as a poorly guarded frontier and the maintenance of various citadels.

Laffemas presented to his colleagues at the Assembly a proposal for a general regulation on the establishment of factories in the kingdom which he had presented to the king that same year. In it he outlined the policy of mercantilism by which domestic production was encouraged and imports avoided to stem the outflow of currency.

Some strategies of control were employed with the deputies. To this end Groulart was invited to eat with président Séguier and during this meal the cost of buying out the remaining elements of the ligueur party were introduced to him. This side-line reveal of the costs did little to stem the tide of outrage when the proposal was put before the Assembly at large.

On 18 November, the intendant Incarville announced to the notables that the crown had devoted 19,440,000 livres towards the submission of ligueur aligned seigneurs and occupied towns, and that the sum might end up being even greater than this as not all magnates had yet been subdued by treaty. This created a furore among the notables.

This was followed by a report of the expenditure of the royal household on 22 November, which was put at 1,169,487 livres, a sum which was less than Bellièvre had imagined it to be in his projections for his program. This was counterbalanced by the report that the amount being spent on the military was 22,500,000 livres, significantly more than he imagined. These figures were verified by committees.

On 26 November, the duc de Montmorency made a proposal that garrisons who owed loyalty to figures other than the king (i.e. provincial seigneurs) should be disbanded and fortifications demolished. He made a gesture of good will that he would lead the way on this in his own government. He received support for this proposal. Similarly it was agreed that it should be illegal for governors and provincial estates to levy taxes without the approval of the crown. The notables followed this proposal of Montmorency up by asking Henri to reduce the number of governors and captains of châteaux/towns to the level which it had been in the years prior to the civil wars. Similarly governors should no longer be allowed to have guards and recently fortified houses/châteaux should be demolished. The cardinal de Gondi announced, on 28 November, that he had presented these proposals to Henri who was favourable, but lacked the means to effect their enaction: compensation would be required for those relieved of office and the destruction of fortifications was expensive. However he welcomed the notables finding the funds to achieve this. He further provided the notables a break down of the royal income devoted to the military so that the notables might advise him on how best to reduce the military budget.

=== Grinding to a halt ===
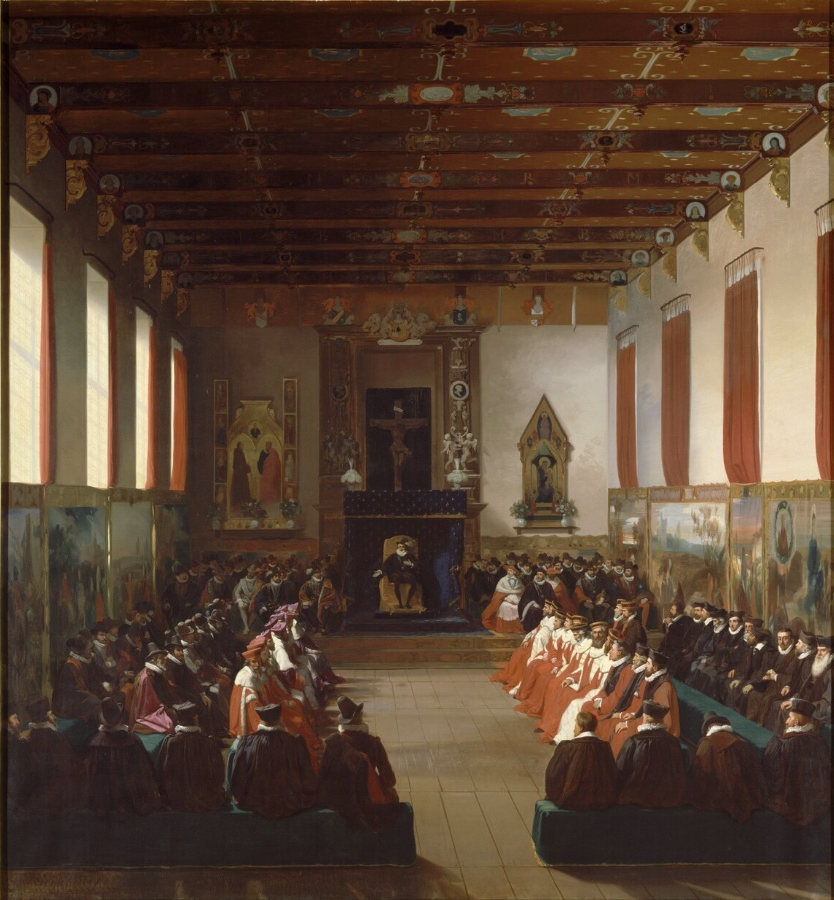
1596 Assembly of Notables during its opening session on 4 November

By 2 December attendance reached such a direly low level that the proceedings could not go ahead. That same day, the cardinal de Gondi met with the royal conseil and was informed by Montmorency that Henri desired the acceleration of the deliberations. The recently arrived Papal Legate the bishop of Mantua protested the presence of the king's Protestant sister Catherine in the 'sacred ground' of the abbots palace but did not object to the recent birth of an illegitimate daughter to the king Catherine-Henriette in the same building on 2 December. The papal legate's arrival had, in addition to the birth of the king's illegitimate daughter, occupied the courts attention at this time to a certain degree.

Groulart would write in his diary on 8 December that some of the notables wished to depart home from Rouen (due to the poor amount that had been accomplished) but had been persuaded to remain in the city by others among the notables.

On 11 December, Henri departed from Rouen for Paris with a small party, and would only return to Rouen on 22 December.

=== New push ===
While it had been hoped on the conseil des finances that simply presently the grim fiscal picture alone would drive the deputies towards proposing new taxation as the cure, it was clear by 12 December this was not going to happen. As a result, Bellièvre and his colleagues appeared before the notables to ask their opinion on several possibilities for new royal revenues. This would be repeated on 19, 23 and 28 December. The prospect of the wars end was hung before the notables, however Bellièvre indicated it would require the funds be provided for one final push. According to a rough draft of a speech of Bellièvre's that survives he argued for the selling of the alienated domain and church property so that the money could be put towards payment of the rentes. Mercantilist methods were endorsed also. A new tax would be required across the kingdom, as well as a grant of a small sum to the king immediately.

While the notables indicated their happiness to afford the king a small sum of money now, there was greater resistance on the matter of a new tax. They counter proposed a clipping of the royal household and military expenses by 8,000,000 livres down to 15,000,000 livres.

On 8 January, the cardinal de Gondi announced that Henri had a few days prior issued an edict that disbanded the companies of horse bound arquebusiers enjoyed by governors, princes and royal officials.

With Henri at his limit of tolerance of the Assembly he had to be begged to not depart Rouen again on 10 January, with the notables asking him to stay until after 16 January so they could submit their cahiers to him. While Henri agreed to maintain himself in Rouen for some further days, 16 January came and went without the submission of the cahiers, the notables still struggling with how to overcome the size of the budget deficit as it was clear economies alone would not achieve it.

=== New tax ===
Henri intervened at this point and proposed to the notables a 5% sales tax on goods entering into towns. The notables were hesitant to endorse such a proposal that put the burden of resolving the deficit on their urban communities as opposed to the crown. At first they attempted to transfer the proposal to the consideration of the 'estates, towns and provinces', but the président of one of the chambers, maréchal de Matignon convinced them to deal with the king's proposal. Thus a committee of first twenty one and then nine were created to meet with the intendant Incarville, Bellièvre and other conseillers to discuss the specifics of the king's tax.

On 25 January the notables approved the 5% sales tax. They also suggested a division of royal revenues into two parts, which might have been inspired by the proposal of Bellièvre's.

=== End of the assembly ===
On 26 January a closing ceremony for the Assembly was held. During the ceremony the notables presented their proposed package of reforms to Henri in the form of their avis (notice) and cahiers de doléances and he informed the notables he would respond within three days.

On 28 January several of the deputies were summoned to meet with some royal financial officials. They were informed it was intolerable to Henri to see his revenues divided as the king required a greater flexibility. The officials were informed by the cardinal de Gondi that this element of the avis could not be modified as the notables had concluded their deliberations. As a result of this on 29 January Henri dismissed the notables without responding to their cahiers.

== Cahiers and avis ==
=== Cahiers of the first and second estates ===
At the front of the avis that the notables presented the king were cahiers submitted by the First (clergy) and Second (noble) Estates that might not have been subject to debates with the other notables.

In the cahiers of the clergy, there was no reference to the adoption of the recommendations of the Council of Trent even though this had brought about the idea of the Assembly to begin with back in March. Indeed, the clerical representatives declared it impractical to reintroduce elections for prelates (a component of the Trentine decrees). Through their rejection of this, the upper clerical offices could remain the preserves of the aristocracy and a method by which the king bestowed his patronage. This contrasted with the cahiers the representatives from the Loudunois had hoped to see adopted. Henri was to encourage the Protestants of the kingdom to follow his example and convert to Catholicism. Catholicism was to be reintroduced into Béarn and Navarre where it had been made illegal in prior years. Clerical abuses were deplored. To resolve this the archbishops were to hold councils every three years to best reintroduce ecclesiastical discipline. Those churches which had as a by-product of the civil wars been transformed into military buildings were to be returned to the church. The horses of soldiers were not to be quartered in places of worship.

These proposals were a great relief to the Papal Legate, who had feared the Protestants of the Assembly might lead the resolutions astray. He reported with satisfaction to the Pope on the good resolution of the notables as concerned religion.

In the cahiers of the nobility it was requested that only those with long and great service to the king, or who had achieved military feats should be ennobled. Those who had been recently ennobled or who weren't ennobled but who possessed the estates of old noble families should be prohibited from taking on the name or arms of the old family. They spoke in favour of sumptuary laws such that luxury be clamped down on and each Estate of the kingdom be dressed in a manner that was visually distinct. They claimed an exclusive right to the offices of the royal household, the baillis and sénéchaux (baillifs and seneschals) as well as participation in the compagnies d'ordonnnace (ordonnance companies - heavy cavalry units that formed the core of the army). While it would not be their exclusive prerogative they wished to be the port of first call for the positions of prelates in the church, abbots, priors, lieutenants to the aforementioned baillis and sénéchaux as well as présidents and conseillers in the various sovereign courts of the crown. Salmon notes that it is a surprise the noblesse d'épee (nobility of the sword) wished to re-enter the judicial domain of the noblesse de robe (nobility of the gown). Where nobles lived in towns they requested the nobles not be subject to the same tax impositions or forced loans that the bourgeois of the town were. They requested Henri resolve the dispute that had arisen in the Dauphiné as to whether nobles should pay the taille on non-noble land they had come into possession in their favour (i.e. that they did not need to pay it). Where nobles experienced a financial loss from the cancellation of the arrears of the taille (due to having taken on the responsibility to garrison towns in return for revenue from the taille) the king should compensate them. In addition to all these demands, the nobles made the offer that no one except the king should have the right to see a fortification established (be it on a town or elsewhere), an endorsement of the proposal of the connétable de Montmorency.

=== Tax and finance ===
Financial administration of France in 1789 with the pays d'État labelled

In the main avis, the notables abandoned Bellièvre's proposal to see the taille, taillon and crue reduced from 18,000,000 to 15,000,000 livres, as this would have required acceptance of a redistribution of the tax burden into a new 3,000,000 in tax on walled towns which they were unwilling to countenance. They approved the creation of the new tax that Bellièvre and Henri had each proposed, which would be known as the pancarte. This was a tax on the entry of goods (with the exception of wheat) into towns for fairs and markets, the value of which was a sou on every livre. This amounted to a 5% tax. The notables wished to at least partly control the pancarte tax. It would be authorised for a three-year period, after which consent would have to be renewed.

The notables were concerned about what use Henri would put the money derived from the pancarte to, given his reputation for financial liberality. Pitts argues, based on this, that the king's invitation of the marquis de Montceaux might have been a mistake. As a result of this they proposed dividing the projected income of 10,000,000 écus into halves. Five million écus would be for Henri to spend at his discretion on his household and the prosecution of war. The other five million would be devoted to debts and wages and would be spent under supervision.

In addition to the pancarte, a direct grant of 1,500,000 écus was offered by the notables to Henri.

They proposed that exemptions from the taille granted to more junior royal officials, towns which had not enjoyed exemption prior to the start of the troubles and those who had bought their nobility after 1577 be revoked. Further on the taille they charged that the pays d'État of Bretagne, Provence, Dauphiné and Bourgogne did not pay their proper share and therefore 658,518 should be raised from these areas.

They expressed their desire to see the suppression of the partis, the financial syndicates that ran several of the tax farms. They urged for the immediate repayment of debts to the crown and expressed a desire to see the tax farms (auctioned off rights to collect taxation to private parties) kept under close control. Concerned that 'financial agents' were redirecting public funds the notables proposed the following. Those who had loaned the king money should be kept away from the levers that controlled financial offices and tax farms. Similarly those with debt should not be allowed immediate access to tax revenues. Limits should be imposed on exporting coinage.

Various checks were to be undertaken on subjects from the tax records (down to the diocese level) to the validity of the king's various debts.

=== Royal budget ===
Similar to how Bellièvre had proposed royal expenses were divided by the notables into two sections: firstly those that concerned military matters or the royal household, secondly those that concerned the rentes and salaries of royal officials. To each of these baskets of expenses would be allocated various tax revenues, with 15,000,000 allocated to the royal household and military, a great degree less than Bellièvre had sought to allocate. The notables did not take up his proposal of a conseil du bon ordre to administer the second basket of expenses.

Economies were also proposed in the avis. Firstly, all royal officials should have their incomes cut by 10%. Further to this there would be a year long suspension to their incomes. The bureaucracy could be curtailed in its size by leaving offices vacant on the deaths of their incumbents. Any further venal office creation should be prohibited Where the crown had created new élections(administrative division for finance) these should be abolished, and the number of officials in an élection should be reduced to four. For the royal household there would be dramatic reductions in size. The number of provincial governors and captains of châteaux was to be slashed. The provincial estates of Languedoc were to scale back their meetings from every year to every three years.

The rentes should not be reduced, but rather the domain should be permanently alienated and those aides that presently had a right of redemption attached. Though the rentes would remain stable, the interest rate on them could be reduced. Before these processes transpired an official would ensure the initial purchase was legal. Where the domain had been alienated in the form of a gift this should be reclaimed by the crown.

=== Miscellaneous requests ===
In a mercantilist vein, they argued against the export of unprocessed raw materials and the import of manufactured goods. By contrast the import of unprocessed materials (and foreign workers) was to be encouraged.

The depredations of the civil wars and corruption in the administration were deplored by the notables. Those royal judges who had become clients of nobles and drew pensions or other benefits from them were to be dismissed from their offices.

They argued tax and coinage could only emanate from the king's authority. Where royal revenues were illicitly appropriate the offender was to be executed.

Finally they requested a new Assembly of Notables be convened three years after the closure of the one in which they had participated, so that they might best assess where affairs had deviated from their recommendations and aid their service of Henri. Subject to the allowance of circumstances, they desired the convening of an Estates General.

=== Reactions to the avis ===
Henri for his part fumed at the notables' attempts to control his finances, but conceded to a small reduction in the expenditure of the royal household and a denunciation of corrupt officials. The cardinale di Firenze opined that consensus was that the notables had made good proposals, but that their utility was contingent on the crowns ability to put them into practice.

At least in the short term, the Assembly of Notables was a triumph for Bellièvre's fiscal program. His triumph would however be short lived. The military crisis that followed shortly on the heels of the Assembly foiled his ability to see the success of his program. Meanwhile, his rival Rosny who raised funds more rapaciously began to supplant him.

== Legacy ==
=== Initial royal adoption of proposals ===
While the notables were still in their deliberations, the conseil des finances had remitted the unpaid taille from the years 1589–1594.

In January the crown began to act upon the recommendations of the notables. Fiscal and eaux et fôrets (water and forest) offices were suppressed. It was declared that nobles could not involve themselves in local tax collection or institute their own charges.

The proposals the crown had desired to clamp down on the power of the great nobles to instrument patron-client relationships were also acted upon. To this end royal officials would not be permitted to hold positions in the households of princes, the ability to place relatives on a court was limited and limits were imposed on the 'special fees' judges were allowed to charge.

Venality too was attacked, with those transfers of office that existing office holders attempted to institute in the final forty days of their lives declared to be invalid. By this means it would be made more challenging to arrange the handover of office.

=== New military crisis ===
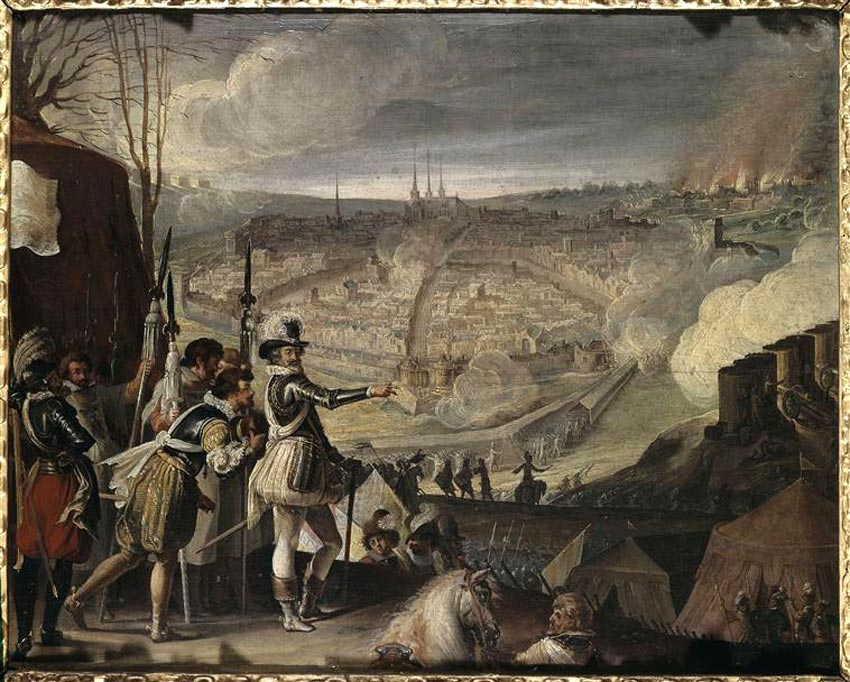
Henri IV, possibly conducting the French siege of Spanish held Amiens

The Spanish capture of Amiens on 11 March 1597 furthered the military crisis and induced further need for money from Henri. The province of Picardie was made vulnerable, as was Paris. The king's other enemies, such as the duc de Mercœur in Bretagne also stirred after the loss. Bellièvre and the conseil des finances protested that they had no incomes for the king. The chambre des comptes likewise rejected the imposition of emergency financial measures to raise funds.

=== Pancarte ===
The pancarte tax was instituted on 10 March 1597 (a day before the fall of Amiens) with the expectation it would yield revenues of 4,000,000 livres. Both Bellièvre and Montmorency were of the opinion its registration should be automatic as it had received the assent of the Assembly of Notables, however the cour des aides disagreed. In particular the président Jean Chandon argued to Bellièvre many of the deputies at the Assembly had been sent there with instructions to stand against the creation of any new taxes. However the desperate plight of the crown after Amiens and Henri's insistence overcame this objection. It was thus with considerable reluctance that the pancarte would be registered by the body on 28 April. The tax raised considerable opposition in the urban centres. Tempers ran particularly high concerning the tax in Limoges. It would yield far lower revenues than anticipated, totalling around 800,000 livres. As a result of these problems the tax would be abolished on 10 November 1602.

On 27 March a general assembly met in Paris to discuss the new pancarte tax. No action on it had been taken by 15 April when Henri announced his intention to make Paris pay to support 4,000 Swiss soldiers for six months. Cheverny, Bellièvre and Montmorency worked to convince the Parisian assemblies of the merit of this course. Nevertheless, on 28 April, Henri was presented with a remonstrance from the city of Paris in which his government was charged with corruption and financial liberality. They requested Henri ensure his conseil des finances was composed of 'good men' and to introduce a special commission to deal with those guilty of financial mispractice. Once the king had done this, they would assent to the 360,000 livres, but even then only if they could assure themselves the money would actually be put towards that end.

In addition to the measures secured from the notables, which would largely offer a long-term financial benefit, Henri needed immediate financial relief. He thus imposed a forced loan of 300,000 livres on the parlementaires and wealthy citizens of Paris to raise war funds. This was met with significant resistance by the parlement. Venal offices in the judiciary and financial administration were sold off once more.

Opposition to Henri from the parlementaires also emerged. They rejected the pancarte, and the levy on them to pay for the king's Swiss mercenaries. Five times between 6 February and 12 March they remonstrated the crown to see the implementation of the suggestions the notables had made at the recent Assembly. The recent fall of Amiens convinced the parlementaires Henri's skills lay in warfare and romance, not administration. The parlement also disapproved of the creation of new venal offices. On 26 April the parlement remonstrated to Henri severely. They accused those around him of robbery, lectured Henri as to his duties, requested he send them for registration the decisions of the Assembly of Rouen. They suggested investigation be undertaken as to the responsible parties who looted the treasury. Beyond this they proposed in the remonstrance that a new conseil de douze (council of twelve) chosen from a list selected by the parlementaires be formed. This conseil would meet twice a day and advice the king on his policy.

This remonstrance was delivered to the king at Saint-Germain-en-Laye by the parlementaire de Harlay who had participated in the Assembly. Harlay accused Cheverny, Bellièvre and the sécretaire d'État Villeroy of gorging themselves at the expense of the people of France. The money they had taken should therefore be returned. This incensed Henri to the point of being on the edge of "madness", and he denounced Harlay repeatedly as a liar causing the parlementaire to break down. Henri opined disapprovingly to the connétable about the foolish men of the parlement and resolved on his plan to make a visit to them himself.

Having failed to secure the yielding of the parlement through either the intermediary of the duc de Montmorency or the chancelier Cheverny, Henri resolved on the necessity of his presence at the palais de justice.

Arriving in the palais de justice Henri worked on the parlementaires with a mixture of reason and soothing words in a meeting on 11 May. He chastised them for their 'slowness, stubbornness and disobedience'. He concluded his address by suggesting he might go to Vlaanderen and risk being shot, as then they would understand the cost of lacking a king. He further shouted at the parlementaires 'I am the king! I will be obeyed!'. Nevertheless, the parlement remained obstinate in their refusal to register his edicts creating new offices and revenue streams. Henri was forced to turn to a lit de justice (a special session which allowed Henri to override parlementaire opposition) to push through the measures. Bellièvre prepared several temperate speeches for the occasion of the lit de justice but the king ignored them in favour of a short belligerent one of his own making. At the same time he pushed through the creation of a new président and ten new conseillers for every présidial court, to raise money for the army. To reassure his opponents that the money raised by this means would not be wasted he announced the revenues would be stored in a triple locked coffer with one key in the hands of a parlementaire and another in the hands of an official from the chambre des comptes. However these offices would not become realities on the ground, as the existing members of the court paid Henri to suppress them. The parlement of Rouen was even more intractable than that of Rouen, and with the embers of the ligue in the city planning to turn the capital of Normandie over to the Spanish, Henri conceded to reduce his financial demands on Rouen by half as well as the number of new offices.

=== Conseil du bon ordre ===
Sometime between the end of the Assembly and the end of April, Henri yielded to the idea that his revenues be divided into two parts and a special council in Paris to deal with contractual revenues and prosecuting cases of corruption. This is testified to in a memorandum. Several provincial councils were also proposed. Decrees actually establishing these conseils were issued on 8 and 21 May respectively. In these decrees the councils were no longer to be in Paris and provincially located, but rather with the court. There would be a chambre royale, established on 8 May, which would deal with financial malpractice. It would have access to the records of the chambre des comptes. Those who provided information to the chambre that yielded a prosecution would receive a quarter of the illicit funds seized. Its membership would be composed of those of the three sovereign courts of Paris and the maître des requêtes. The second council was called the conseil particulier (in effect the conseil du bon ordre that Bellièvre had proposed with the investigate functions spun off into the chambre royale) and would administer those parts of the royal revenues concerned with the payment of officials, rentes and contractual obligations. To this end it would improve the management of the domain aides, gabelles and other farms, reduce salaries as was deemed appropriate and ensure the rentes were as they legally should be allocated. Involved in this conseil would be twelve men: the cardinal de Gondi (who assumed the role of président on 21 May), a handful of great nobles, members of the three sovereign courts of Paris, the maître des requêtes and municipal officials of the capital. The baron de Rosny described this body as a conseil de raison (council of reason).

Rosny would later take credit for convincing the king to assent to the creation of the conseil particulier. He stated that while there had been fears it would divide royal authority and weaken Henri he had informed the king that he could assign to himself those taxes that were to increase in value and be collected easily, and to the conseil the taxes that had declining revenues and were hated by the people. Major challenges Rosny's recollection to a great extent. The baron ignores the role of Bellièvre in devising the conseil and incorrectly ascribes the initiative for the conseil to the notables. The two bodies were created as responses to the recent remonstrances of the Parisian assemblies and parlement to Henri, which had requested a council to deal with corrupt practices (embodied by the chambre royale, and a reconstitution of the conseil des finances (not done, but largely embodied by the creation of a new conseil particulier).

The bodies would have a short half life, surviving barely two months. According to Rosny it was the inexperience of its members that doomed it, with those on the conseil asking to be relieved of their responsibilities due to an inability to cope with the complexity. However, Major again challenges this, arguing that many of the men on the conseil were experienced men of finances. Rather the cause of its dissolution was a by-product of war expenses. Salmon highlights that the conseil that was due to administer the various revenues was not assigned any revenues and thus could not continue to function. The chambre royale meanwhile was undermined both by the corrupt dealings of Cheverny and by the king. In June those financial officials it had investigated were pardoned, and the chambre was abolished, probably in return for a large sum of money from the guilty parties. Major speculates, given the rapid nature of its dissolution whether the purpose of its creation in the first place was for it to be bought out of existence.

=== Triumph of Rosny ===
By October Henri had re-established some of the offices he had suppressed in the wake of the Assembly.

Meanwhile, Henri circumvented the conseil des finances and wrote directly to the baron de Rosny to secure funds for the recapture of Amiens. Rosny raised funds through means of expedient: the creation and sale of new venal offices and an increase in the gabelle among other means. The king complained to Rosny about the chambre des comptes and urged him not to let the funds pass through their hands. Rosny was ordered to join with him with the funds outside Amiens without informing the conseil des finances. Upon his arrival, Henri felt some guilt at circumventing the body and wrote to assure them the money was being put towards a worthy use. In 1598 Rosny would be established as the reconstituted position of the surintendant des finances.

== Sources ==
- Babelon, Jean-Pierre (2009). Henri IV. Fayard.
- Heller, Henry (2003). Anti-Italianism in Sixteenth Century France. University of Toronto Press.
- Jouanna, Arlette (1998). "Le Temps des Guerres de Religion en France (1559-1598)". In Jouanna, Arlette; Boucher, Jacqueline; Biloghi, Dominique; Le Thiec, Guy (eds.). Histoire et Dictionnaire des Guerres de Religion. Éditions Robert Laffont.
- Jouanna, Arlette (1998b). "Assemblées des Notables". In Jouanna, Arlette; Boucher, Jacqueline; Biloghi, Dominique; Le Thiec, Guy (eds.). Histoire et Dictionnaire des Guerres de Religion. Éditions Robert Laffont.
- Jouanna, Arlette (2021). La France du XVIe Siècle 1483-1598. Presses Universitaires de France.
- Knecht, Robert (1996). The Rise and Fall of Renaissance France. Fontana Press.
- Knecht, Robert (2000). The French Civil Wars. Longman.
- Le Roux, Nicolas (2022). 1559-1629 Les Guerres de Religion. Gallimard.
- Le Roux, Nicolas (2023). "Les Protestants, le Roi et la Ligue: Les Guerres de Religion dans la France du Nord". In Le Roux, Nicolas (ed.). Les Guerres de Religion: Une Histoire de l'Europe au XVIe Siècle.
- Major, J. Russell (1974). "Bellièvre, Sully, and the Assembly of Notables of 1596". Transactions of the American Philosophical Society. 64 2.
- Mariéjol, Jean H. (1983). La Réforme, la Ligue, l'Édit de Nantes. Tallandier.
- Pernot, Michel (1987). Les Guerres de Religion en France 1559-1598. Sedes.
- Pitts, Vincent (2012). Henri IV of France: His Reign and Age. Johns Hopkins University Press.
- Salmon, J.H.M. (1979). Society in Crisis: France in the Sixteenth Century. Metheun & Co.
- Sutherland, Nicola (1980). The Huguenot Struggle for Recognition. Yale University Press.
