= Louis, Duke of Joyeuse =

French soldier and official (1622–1654)

Louis de Lorraine
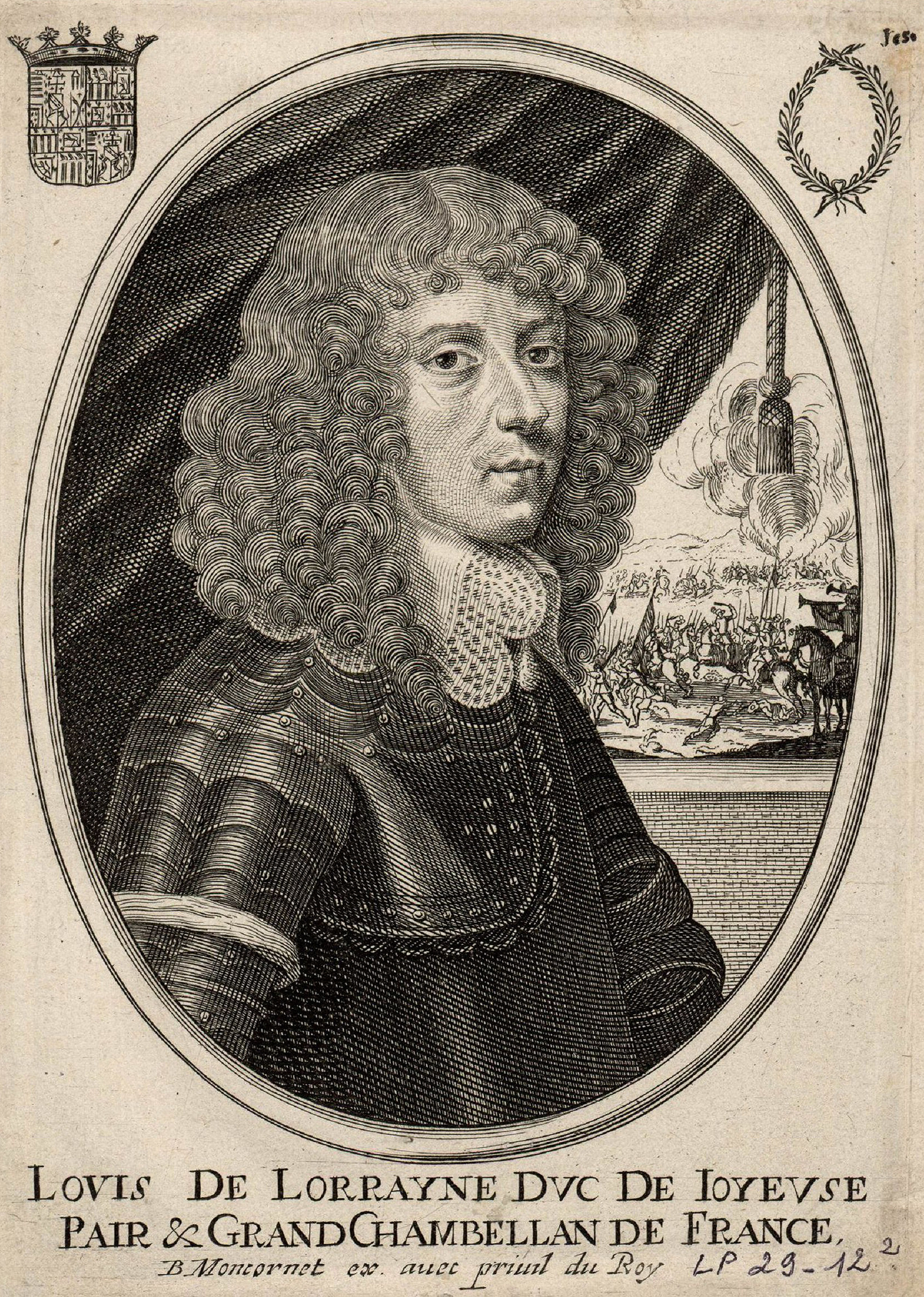
- c. 17th century

Duke of Joyeuse
- Reign: 1647–1654
- Predecessor: Henriette Catherine de Joyeuse
- Successor: Louis Joseph, Duke of Guise
- Born: 11 January 1622
- Died: 27 September 1654 (aged 32); Paris, France
- Noble family: Guise
- Spouses: Marie Françoise de Valois, Duchess of Angoulême
- Issue: Louis Joseph, Duke of Guise; Catherine Henriette
- Father: Charles, Duke of Guise
- Mother: Henriette Catherine de Joyeuse

Louis de Lorraine, Duke of Joyeuse (11 January 1622 – 27 September 1654, Paris) was a younger son of Charles, Duke of Guise and Henriette Catherine de Joyeuse.

== Life ==
He was appointed Grand Chamberlain of France in 1644, shortly after the Guises were permitted to return from their exile in Florence. Louis XIV having returned the confiscated lands of Joyeuse, and the title "Joyeuse", to the once disgraced Guises, upon his majority in 1647 Louis de Lorraine was granted the title Duke of Joyeuse, the duchy of his maternal ancestors.

As Colonel General of the light cavalry, he served as a volunteer at the siege of Gravelines in 1644, and in two other campaigns. ("His company of mounted guards and their trappings were the finest possible", commented a newsletter of the time.) He died in Paris from a wound in his right arm, received on 22 April 1654, while charging the enemy near Arras. He was buried at Joinville near his paternal ancestors.

He married on 3 November 1649, in Toulon, Marie Françoise de Valois (d. 1696), daughter of Louis Emmanuel, Duke of Angoulême, who succeeded her father in 1653. Mentally unstable (imbécile), she was confined, by her mother, to the chateau of Ecouen or at the Hotel d'Angoulême. A few years after their marriage, Marie was sent to the abbey of Essey. They had two children:

- Louis Joseph, Duke of Guise (1650–1671) married Élisabeth Marguerite d'Orléans
- Catherine Henriette (1651–1655/56)

== Sources ==
- Spangler, Jonathan (2009). The Society of Princes: The Lorraine-Guise and the Conservation of Power and Wealth in Seventeenth-Century France. Ashgate.
- Spangler, Jonathan (2016). "Mother Knows Best:The Dowager Duchess of Guise, a Son's Ambitions, and the Regencies of Marie de Medici and Anne of Austria". In Munns, Jessica; Richards, Penny; Spangler, Jonathan (eds.). Aspiration, Representation and Memory: The Guise in Europe, 1506–1688. Routledge. pp. 125–146.
- Ward, A.W.; Prothero, G.W.; Leathes, Stanley, eds. (1911). The Cambridge Modern History. Vol. XIII:Genealogical Tables and Lists. Cambridge at the University Press.

French nobility
Preceded by Henriette Catherine	Duke of Joyeuse; 1647–1654	Succeeded by Louis Joseph
Preceded by Henry II	Count of Eu; 1654	Succeeded by Louis Joseph
Preceded by Louis Emmanuel	Duke of Angoulême with Marie Françoise; 1653–1654	Succeeded by Marie Françoise
