= Henri II, Duke of Guise =

French aristocrat and archbishop (1640–1664)

Henri II de Lorraine
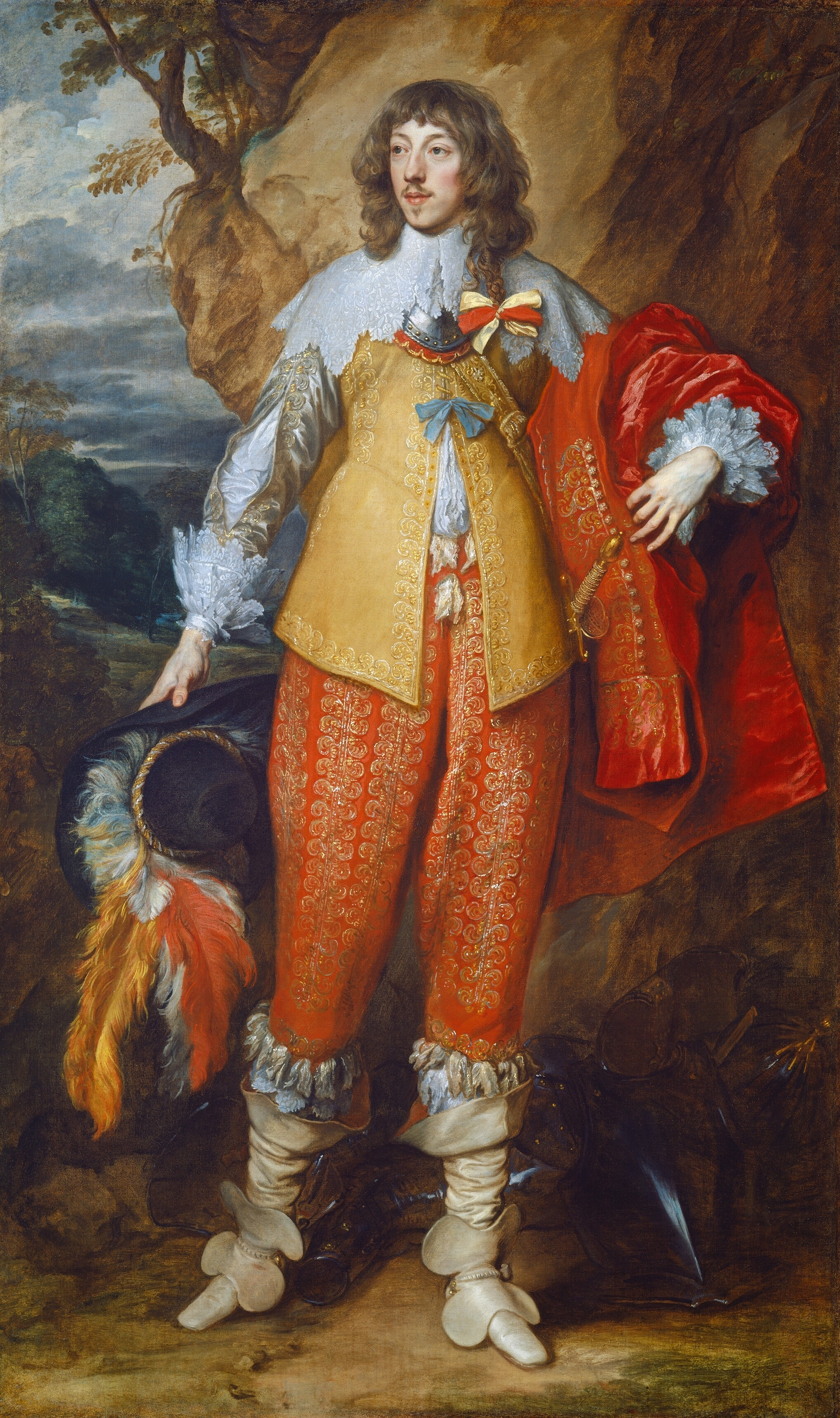
- Henri II de Lorraine, Duc de Guise, by Anthony van Dyck, 1634

Duke of Guise, Prince of Joinville
- Tenure: 30 September 1640 – 2 June 1664
- Predecessor: Charles
- Successor: Louis Joseph

Doge of the Neapolitan Republic
- Reign: 15 November 1647– 5 April 1648
- Predecessor: Philip III as King of Naples
- Successor: Reconquered by Philip III
- Born: 4 April 1614; Paris, France
- Died: 2 June 1664 (aged 50); Paris, France
- House: Guise
- Father: Charles, Duke of Guise
- Mother: Henriette Catherine de Joyeuse

Henri II de Lorraine, 5th Duke of Guise, (4 April 1614, in Paris – 2 June 1664) was a French aristocrat and archbishop, the second son of Charles, Duke of Guise and Henriette Catherine de Joyeuse.

== Life ==
At the age of fifteen, he became archbishop of Reims. According to Gédéon Tallemant des Réaux, he had a well known affair with the actress Marguerite Béguin during this time. The death of his eldest brother Francis in 1639 placed him in the dukedom the following year. He opposed Richelieu, and conspired with the count of Soissons, fighting in the Battle of La Marfée in 1641. For this, he was condemned to death, but fled to Brussels in 1641. His property was seized by the king in 1641, for crime of lèse-majesté. Reprieved, he returned in 1643 and his confiscated property was returned to him.

Coat of Arms of the Dukes of Guise

Hoping to make good his family's ancient pretensions (Note: as son of Charles, son of Henri I, Duke of Guise, son of Anna d'Este, daughter of Renée of France, daughter of Louis XII of France, who reigned as Louis III of Naples (1501-1504).) to the Kingdom of Naples, he joined the revolt of Masaniello in 1647. The "Royal Republic of Naples" was declared, appealing to the protection of France and nominally headed by Guise (entitled doge in imitation of Venice). However, the tactless Guise rapidly alienated the Neapolitans, and wielded little influence with Cardinal Mazarin. He was captured by the Spaniards in 1648 when the republic fell, and held by them until 1652. He made a second attack on Naples in 1654, but it ended in failure, partly because of the presence of an English fleet under Robert Blake in support of the Spanish.

Afterwards, he settled in Paris, becoming Grand Chamberlain of France to Louis XIV and going deeply into debt because of his expenditures for horses and entertainments. He was the patron of Pierre Corneille, to whom he gave a lodging in the Hôtel de Guise.

Over the years two women laid claim to being his wife. The first was Anna Gonzaga later known as the "Princess Palatine," who in 1639 appears to have been duped into believing that a clandestine marriage ceremony was genuine. The second was a widow of Albert Maximilien de Hénin-Liétard (1617-1640), Honorée de Berghes, Countess of Bossut (1617-1679), who claimed to have married him in Brussels on November 11, 1641. In March 1666 the Sacra Rota declared the marriage valid; but the King (and the House of Guise) refused to recognize the decision, thereby preventing Mme de Bossut from receiving any of the late Duke's vast fortune.

Anna Gonzaga described Duke Henri's "good and bad qualities" as follows:

Monsieur Guise had the figure, the air and the manners of a hero in a novel, and his entire life bore the mark this character. Magnificence reigned in his entire person and in everything that surrounded him; his conversation was especially charming: everything he said, everything he did, proclaimed that he was an extraordinary man. Ambition and love dominated his projects, which were so vast that they were Homeric; but with such an illustrious name, heroic valor, and a bit of good fortune, nothing exceeded his hopes. He had a gift for making himself loved by all those he wanted to please, which seemed to be the lot of the princes of the House of Lorraine. He was flighty in his attachments, inconstant in his projects, hasty in carrying things out.

Henri died in Paris on 2 June 1664 and was succeeded by his nephew Louis Joseph de Lorraine.

== Sources ==
- Bergin, Joseph (1996). The Making of the French Episcopate, 1589-1661. Yale University Press.
- Graheli, Shanti (2017). "Collections of Italian Broadsheets in French Libraries". In Pettegree, Andrew (ed.). Broadsheets: Single-Sheet Publishing in the First Age of Print. Brill.
- Spangler, Jonathan (2009). The Society of Princes: The Lorraine-Guise and the Conservation of Power and. Routledge.

Catholic Church titles
Preceded by Gabriel de Sainte-Marie	Archbishop of Reims; 1629–1641	Succeeded by Léonore d'Étampes de Valençay
French nobility
Preceded by Charles	Duke of Guise and Prince of Joinville; 1640–1664	Succeeded by Louis Joseph
Preceded by Charles	Count of Eu; 1640–1654	Succeeded by Louis
