= Henriette Catherine de Joyeuse =

French noblewoman (1585–1656)

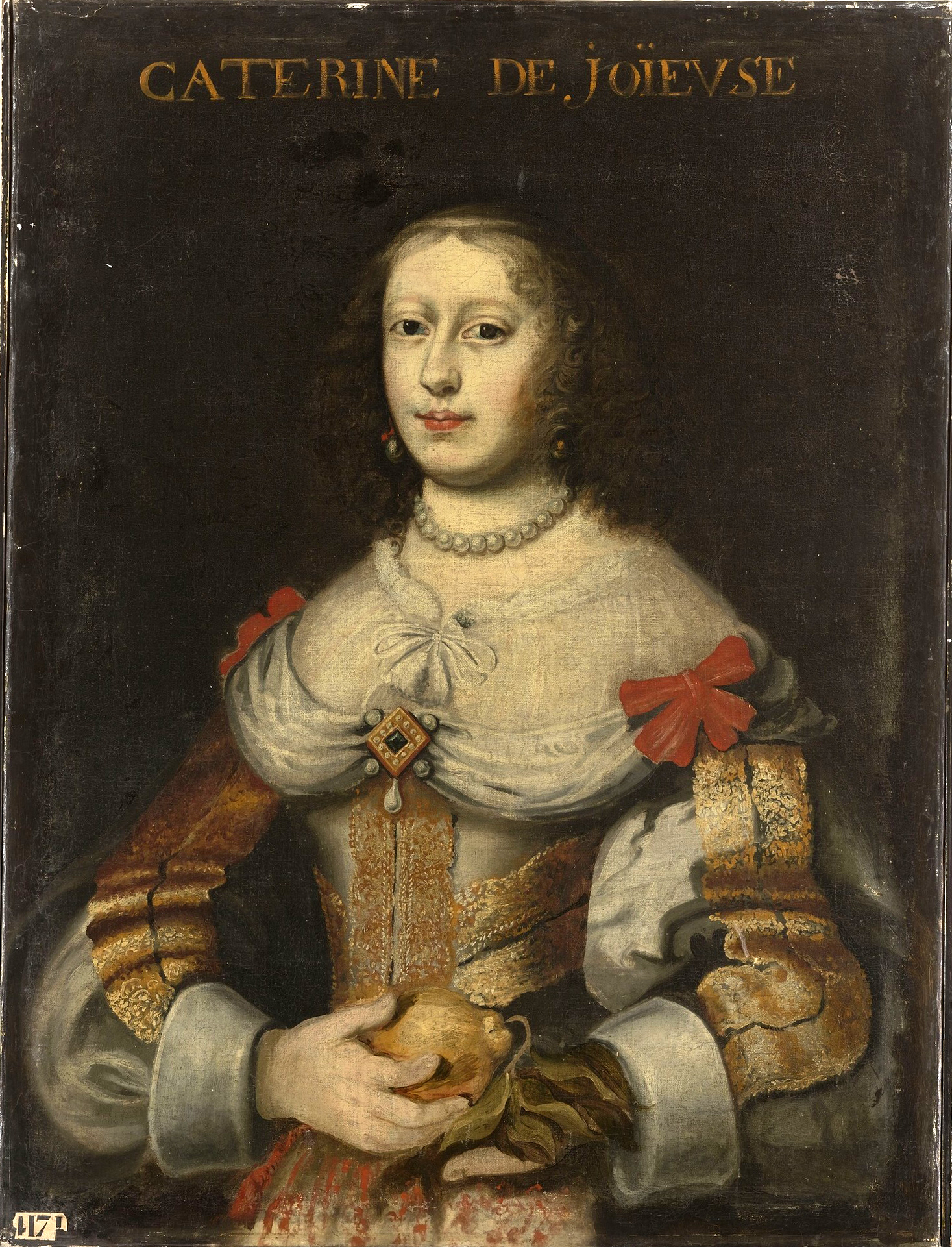

Duchess of Joyeuse
- Reign: 1608 – 25 February 1656
- Predecessor: Henri, Duke of Joyeuse
- Successor: Louis, Duke of Joyeuse
- Born: January 8, 1585
- Died: 25 February 1656 (aged 71)
- Spouse(s): Henri, Duke of Montpensier; Charles, Duke of Guise
- Issue: Marie de Bourbon, Duchess of Montpensier; François de Lorraine; Henri II, Duke of Guise; Marie de Lorraine, Duchess of Guise; Mademoiselle de Joinville; Charles Louis de Lorraine; Louis, Duke of Joyeuse; Françoise Renée de Lorraine; Roger de Lorraine
- Father: Henri, Duke of Joyeuse
- Mother: Catherine de Nogaret de La Valette

Henriette Catherine de Joyeuse (8 January 1585 – 25 February 1656) was the daughter of Henri de Joyeuse and Catherine de Nogaret de La Valette. She married her first husband, Henri de Bourbon, Duke of Montpensier, on 15 May 1597 and her second husband, Charles, Duke of Guise, on 6 January 1611.

== Marriages and children ==
From her first marriage to Henri de Bourbon she had one child:

1. Marie de Bourbon, Duchess of Montpensier (15 October 1605 – 4 June 1627), who married Gaston Jean Baptiste de France, duc d'Orléans; parents of la Grande Mademoiselle

From her second marriage to Charles, Duke of Guise she had ten children:

1. François de Lorraine (April 3, 1612 – December 7, 1639)
2. Twin boys (4 March 1613 – 19 March 1613), who were very frail and sickly. They died on the same day.
3. Henri de Lorraine, Duke of Guise (1614–1664), also Archbishop of Reims
4. Marie de Lorraine, Duchess of Guise (1615–1688)
5. A girl, called Mademoiselle de Joinville (4 March 1617 – 18 January 1618), who was born healthy but caught a cold in the winter of 1617 and died shortly thereafter.
6. Charles Louis de Lorraine (July 15, 1618 – March 15, 1637, Florence), styled Duke of Joyeuse
7. Louis de Lorraine, Duke of Joyeuse (1622–1664), also Duke of Angoulême
8. Françoise Renée de Lorraine (January 10, 1621 – December 4, 1682, Montmartre), Abbess of Montmartre
9. Roger de Lorraine (March 21, 1624 – September 9, 1653)

== Sources ==
- Diefendorf, Barbara B. (2004). From Penitence to Charity: Pious Women and the Catholic Reformation in Paris. Oxford University Press.
- Spangler, Jonathan (2009). The Society of Princes: The Lorraine-Guise and the Conservation of Power and Wealth in Seventeenth-Century France. Ashgate Publishing.
