= Henri, Duke of Montpensier =

French 'prince du sang' and governor (1573-1608)

Henri
- Duke of Montpensier
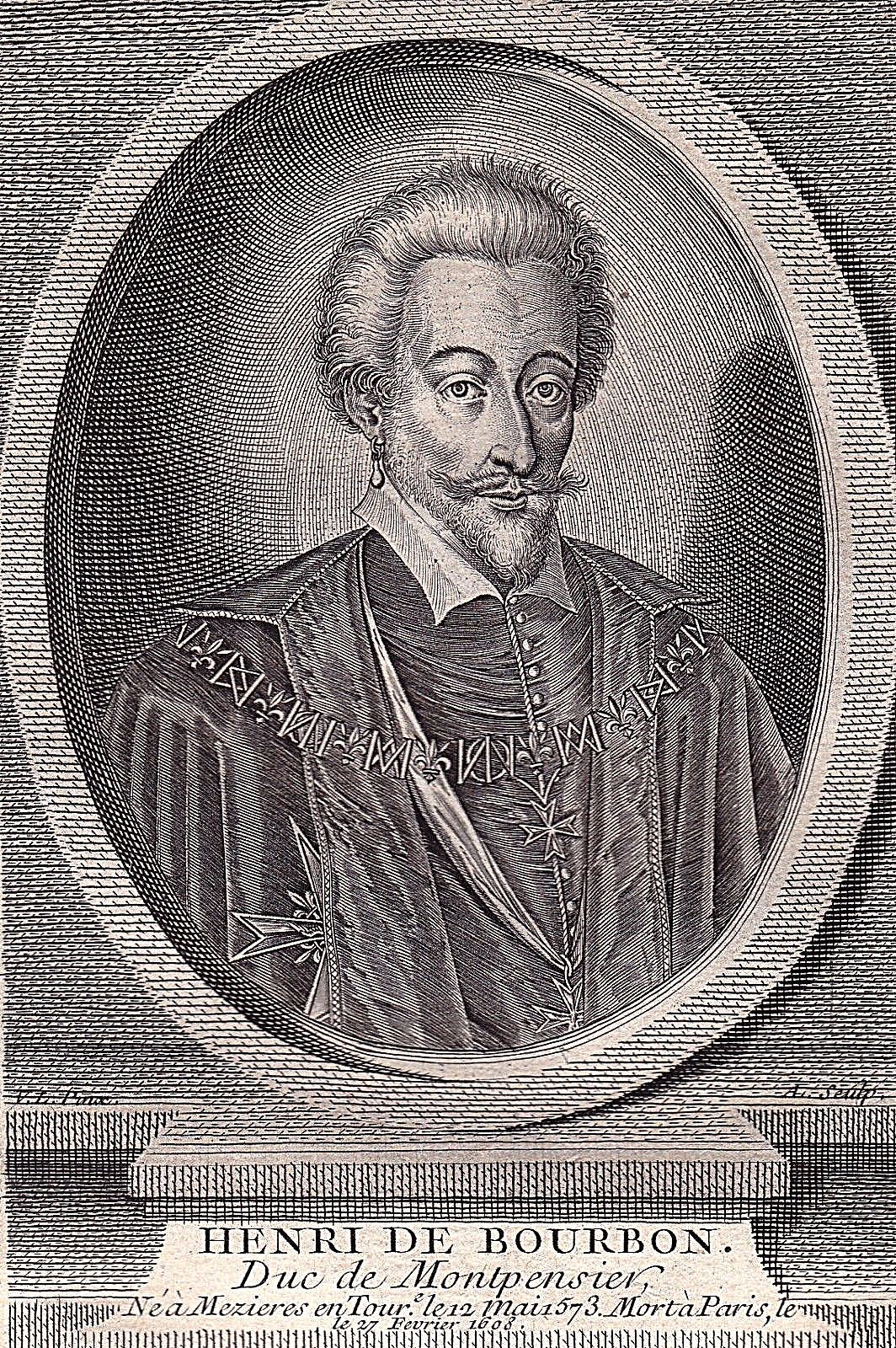
- Born: 1573
- Died: 27 February 1608 (aged 34–35)
- Spouse: Henriette Catherine de Joyeuse
- Issue: Marie, Duchess of Montpensier
- Father: François, Duke of Montpensier
- Mother: Renée d'Anjou-Mézières
- Religion: Catholic

Henri, prince dauphin d'Auvergne, then prince de Dombes and duc de Montpensier (1573 – 27 February 1608) was a French prince du sang (prince of the blood), duke, military commander, governor and royal councillor during the final days of the French Wars of Religion. The son of François, Duke of Montpensier and Renée d'Anjou, Montpensier (known as Dombes prior to the death of his father) remained loyal to king Henri III after he entered war with the Catholic ligue (league) in December 1588. As a reward for his loyalty he was made first governor of Basse (lower) Auvergne, and then, upon the capture of the comte de Soissons he was established as governor of Bretagne.

This role brought him into conflict with the ligueur aligned former governor of the province duc de Mercœur. He initially had advantage against the ligue in the province, but this was reversed when Mercœur invited a large Spanish garrison into the province. After the death of Henri III in August 1589, Dombes and his father Montpensier transferred their loyalty to the Protestant king of Navarre who continued the royalist war on the ligue. In June 1592, Dombes' father died, and he succeeded him as governor of Normandie and duc de Montpensier. He succeeded in securing Honfleur for the royalist cause, however the majority of Normandie was brought into the royal fold by the buying off of its governor Admiral Villars. Montpensier presided over one of the Three Estates at the Assembly of Notables convoked to alleviate the kingdoms financial troubles in 1596. He was among the grandees who opposed the Edict of Nantes which granted toleration to Protestantism. His seniority in the line of succession ensured him a place on the royal council, even if Henri had a low opinion of his intelligence. He died on 27 February 1608 and was succeeded as governor of Normandie by the future king Louis XIII.

== Early life and family ==
Henri, duc de Montpensier was born in 1573, the only son of François, Duke of Montpensier and Renée d'Anjou.

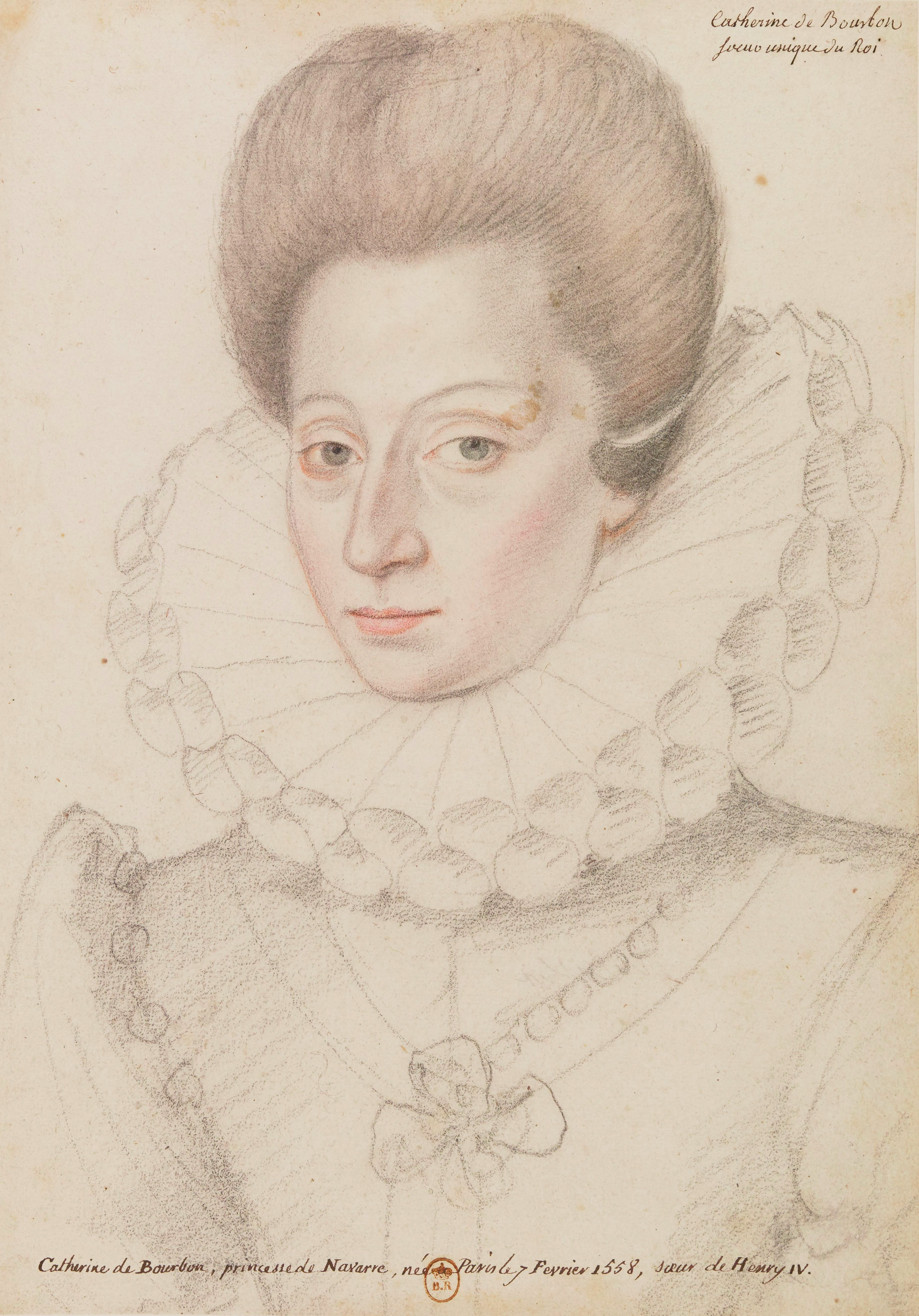
Sketch of Catherine of Bourbon who was at various times proposed as a wife for Montpensier

During 1586, negotiations were undertaken between the Bourbon-Montpensier family and the Gonzague duc de Nevers for several marriages between the houses. Henri was destined for a marriage with Henriette de Gonzague when he reached marriageable age, while his father François was to marry Catherine de Gonzague. Neither of these marriages would come to pass.

Montpensier was promised the prospect of a marriage to king Henri IV's sister Catherine. The earliest negotiations to this affect were undertaken in 1592, with the king bringing Montpensier from Bretagne so that the marriage could be arranged. However, when he met Catherine, she revealed that she had already promised her hand to the king's cousin the comte de Soissons, enraging the king. Despite negotiations undertaken by the king's chief council Sully in 1596, this arrangement ultimately came to nothing. In 1597, Montpensier married the extremely wealthy heiress Henriette Catherine de Joyeuse. Henriette-Catherine brought both the inheritance of the royal favourites Henri de Joyeuse and Anne de Joyeuse with her in the arrangement, a total of 2,000,000 livres in value. She would outlive her husband, marrying again to the duc de Guise in 1611.

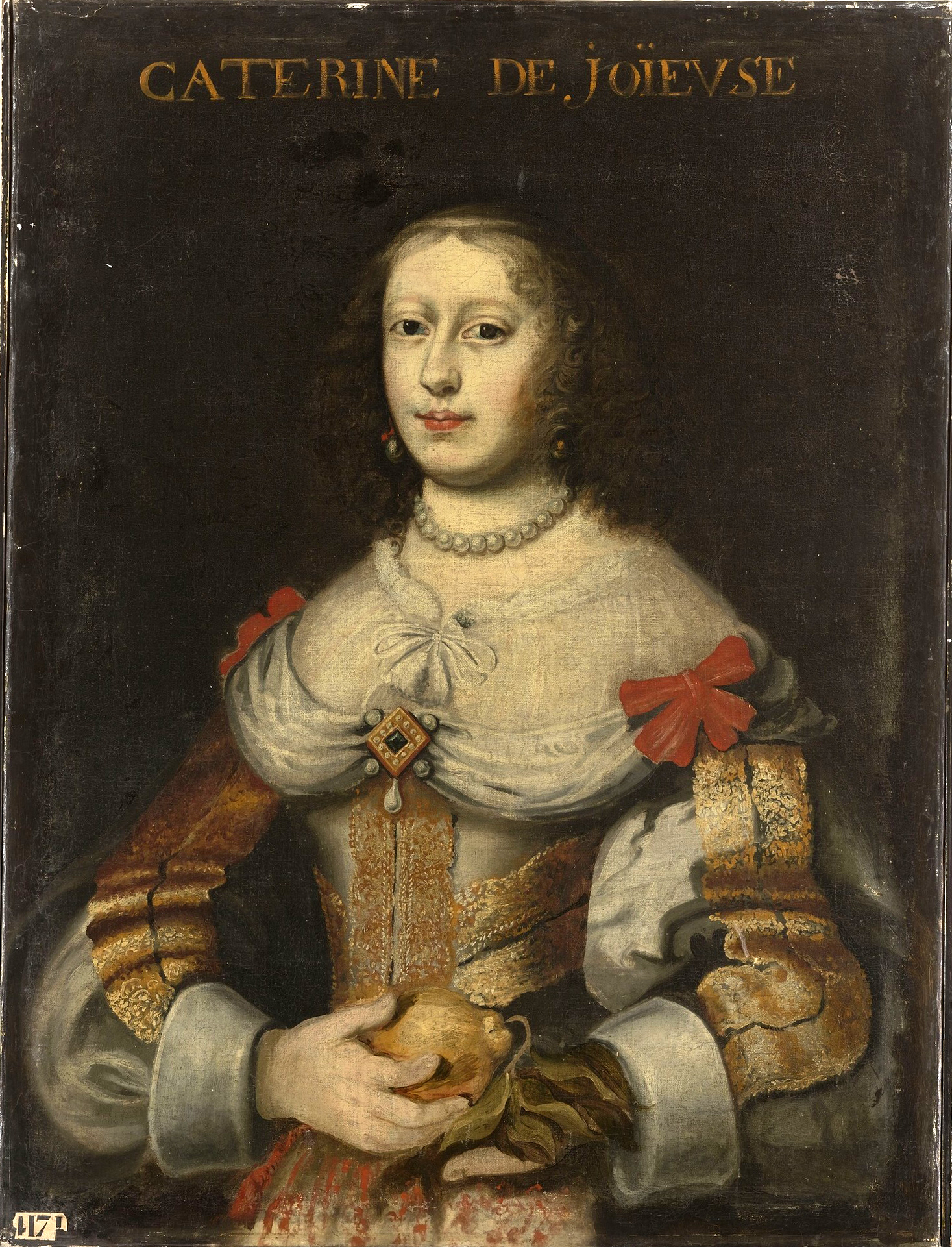
Montpensier's wife, Henriette Catherine de Joyeuse

Together they would have the following issue:

- Marie, Duchess of Montpensier (1605-1627), married Gaston, Duke of Orléans, brother of Louis XIII.

== Reign of Henri III ==
=== Second Catholic ligue ===
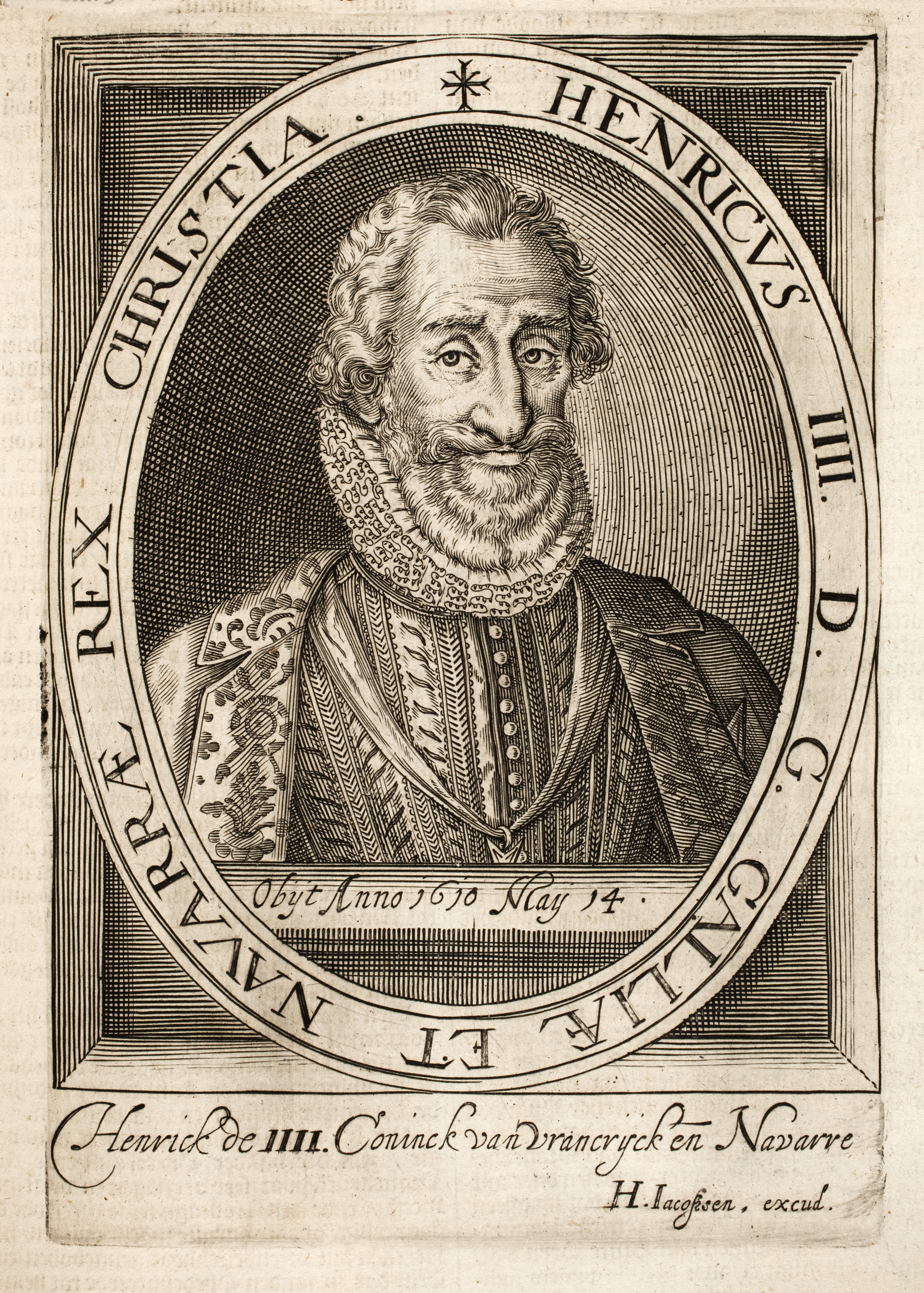
Engraving of the king's cousin, the king of Navarre and future king of France Henri IV

In 1584, Henri III's brother Alençon died, and in the absence of a son his heir became his distant Protestant cousin the king of Navarre. This was unacceptable to segments of the Catholic nobility, led by the duc de Guise who re-founded the Catholic ligue (league) in opposition to his succession and other grievances. According to the ligueur (leaguer) theorists, the heir to the throne was Navarre's Catholic uncle Cardinal Bourbon. In this framework, the young Catholic prince de Dombes was fifth in line for the throne.

In the wake of the Day of the Barricades, during which the ligue seized Paris, the royal favourite the duc d'Épernon was disgraced as a concession to the Parisian ligueurs. He retired from court to his stronghold of Loches. Denied access to royal favour, he looked to alternate sources of support, first among them the Bourbon princes. Dombes was solicited alongside the prince de Conti and the comte de Soissons for backing.

=== Governor ===
On 23 December 1588, Henri oversaw the assassination of the leader of the Catholic ligue, the duc de Guise. In response to this move, those aligned with the ligue entered war with the crown. Dombes and the other Catholic prince du sang (princes of the blood) remained loyal to the king. As a reward for his loyalty Dombes received the governorship of basse (lower) Auvergne in February 1589. Through receipt of this office he relieved the comte de Randan.

In his capacity as governor in Auvergne, he took charge of the royalist war effort in the province against the ligue, aiming to drive them from the area.

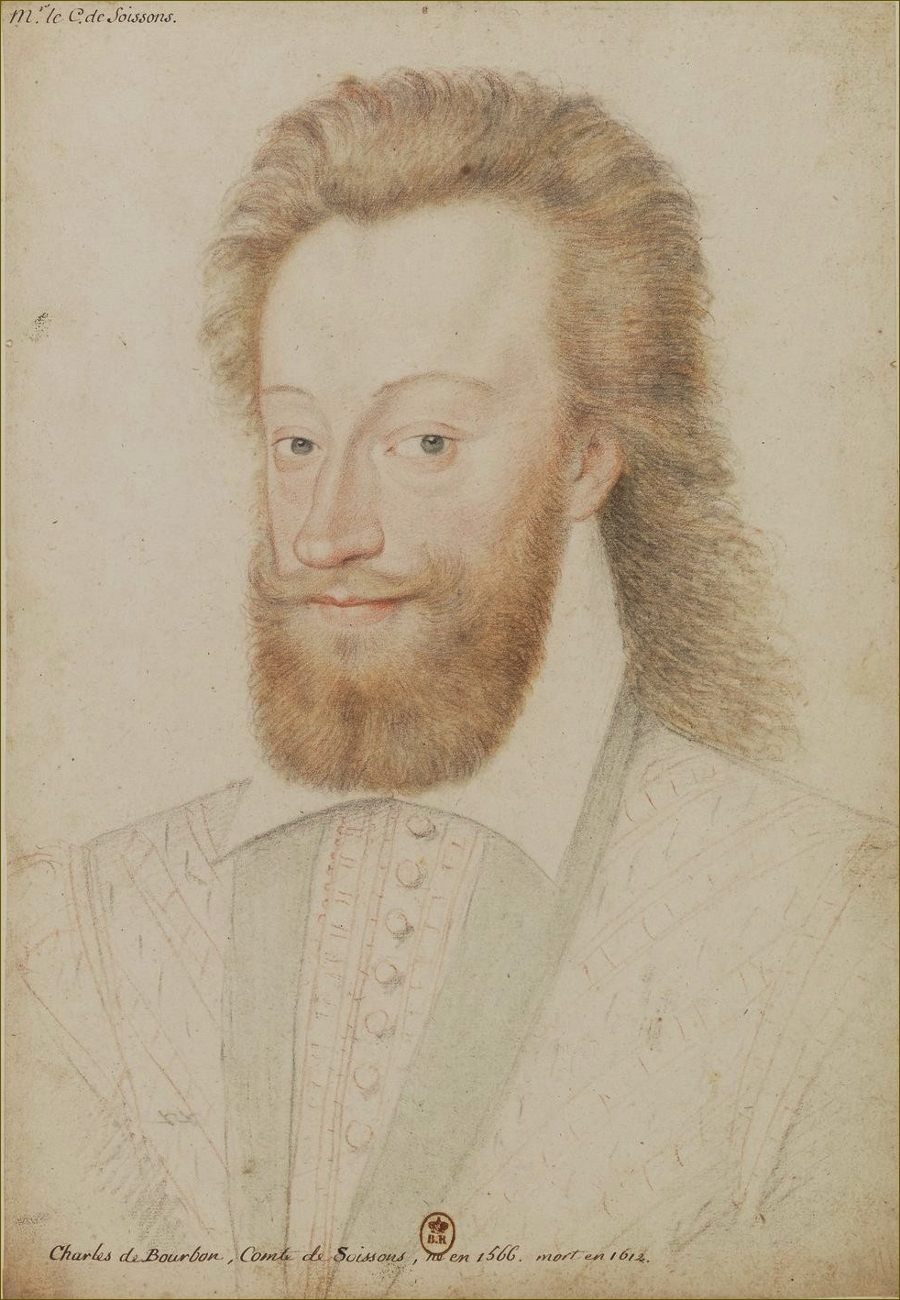
Sketch of the comte de Soissons, who was made governor of Bretagne

Another replacement caused by the beginning of a war with the ligueurs was the appointment of Soissons as governor of Bretagne, in replacement of the ligueur duc de Mercœur. On route to take up his new charge, Soissons was ambushed at Châteaugiron and taken prisoner by ligueur forces. With little interest in Soissons honour, Henri quickly appointed Dombes to replace him in his charge, infuriating Soissons. The king of Navarre, with whom Henri was allied against the ligue, while closely related to Soissons, congratulated Henri on his choice of Dombes.

Soissons would not long be captive however, and on 21 July he escaped from his prison in Nantes. He quickly set about a campaign of letter writing to have his governate returned to him, however Henri was uninterested in humouring these requests, focused as he was on his plans to besiege ligueur held Paris.

== Reign of Henri IV ==
=== Loyalist ===
With the death of Henri III, Navarre succeeded him as the royalist candidate for the throne as Henri IV. Dombes maintained his loyalty to the royalist cause even under a Protestant king. To this end he brought much of the Breton nobility that found Mercœur intolerable into the royal camp.

At first Dombes had Mercœur on the backfoot in Bretagne, however his relative ascendency was reversed after Mercœur invited a Spanish occupation of the province, with a Spanish army of 4000 men establishing itself at Blavet in the summer of 1590. Dombes responded with a propaganda offensive, writing to the provincial Estates of Bretagne, denouncing the 'tyranny of the Spanish'.

=== Duc de Montpensier ===
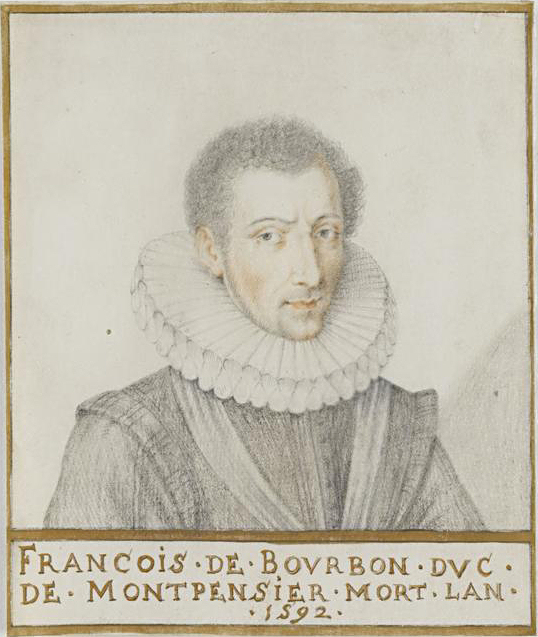
Montpensier's father François, Duke of Montpensier

On 4 June 1592, Dombes' father died, and he became the duc de Montpensier. He therefore took up his father's command as governor of Normandie. While loyal to the royalist cause, he warned Henri that if he did not fulfil the promise he had made to convert to Catholicism, he and the other Catholic Bourbon princes would have little choice but to defect to the ligue for the 'preservation of their dynastic rights'. In this way he formed part of a 'third party' at the court of Henri that pushed him towards his conversion to Catholicism in June 1593.

Montpensier featured in the propaganda of his opponents. He was portrayed alongside Henri as a 'devil' while the ligueur duc de Mayenne and Mercœur were shown to be 'angels'. In the final years of the war with the ligue, Montpensier was wounded.

On 27 February 1594, Henri was finally able to have his coronation conducted in Chartres. Alongside the king for this momentous occasion were the various royalist princes and dukes: Conti, Piney, Retz, Ventadour and Montpensier. Of the three royal princes present, Montpensier was third in precedence behind Conti and Soissons, who were closer in the laws of primogeniture succession.

Though governor of Normandie, Montpensier still lacked control of the most important city of his province, that of Rouen, which was held by the ligue. In mid 1594, Henri negotiated the surrender of the city, after his entry into Paris, at an exorbitant sum. The ligueur governor of the city extracted the promise that he could remain at his post, and receive the office of Admiral. This meant that Montpensier would remain with little control over the city.

Denied the prospect of securing Rouen, Montpensier had to satisfy himself with bringing Honfleur back into the control of the crown.

=== Assembly of Notables ===
In November 1596, the king convoked an Assembly of Notables at Rouen. Their purpose was to consider several proposals to alleviate the financial hardship the kingdom was experiencing. One package was prepared by the king's minister Sully and proposed various quick expedients to secure a cash flow, the other was devised by Bellièvre, and was constituted of a wide scale austerity program, with large restructuring of France's finances. To lead the discussions of the notables in considering these proposals the three orders (clergy, nobility and commons) were led by Montpensier, Marshal Retz and Marshal Matignon respectively.

In the end, the notables agreed to the establishment of a new tax, known as the pancarte which appropriated 1/20th of the revenue of goods, and a year long suspension of royal wages.

=== Nantes ===
Despite his newfound Catholicism, in 1598 Henri established the Edict of Nantes which granted toleration to Protestantism across France. Montpensier opposed the decree, in alliance with the duc de Joyeuse and duc d'Épernon. The three men met in Paris to discuss how to respond to the measure.

By 1600 there was growing unease among much of the senior aristocracy of Henri's centralising and autocratic tendencies. In opposition to this, in 1601 Montpensier brought a proposal to the king in which he advocated that provincial governates be hereditary in nature. Only an oath of loyalty would bind them to the king. Henri scoffed at the idea, opining that Montpensier was too unintelligent to have even come up with it himself. He therefore proceeded to reject it out of hand.

=== Final years ===
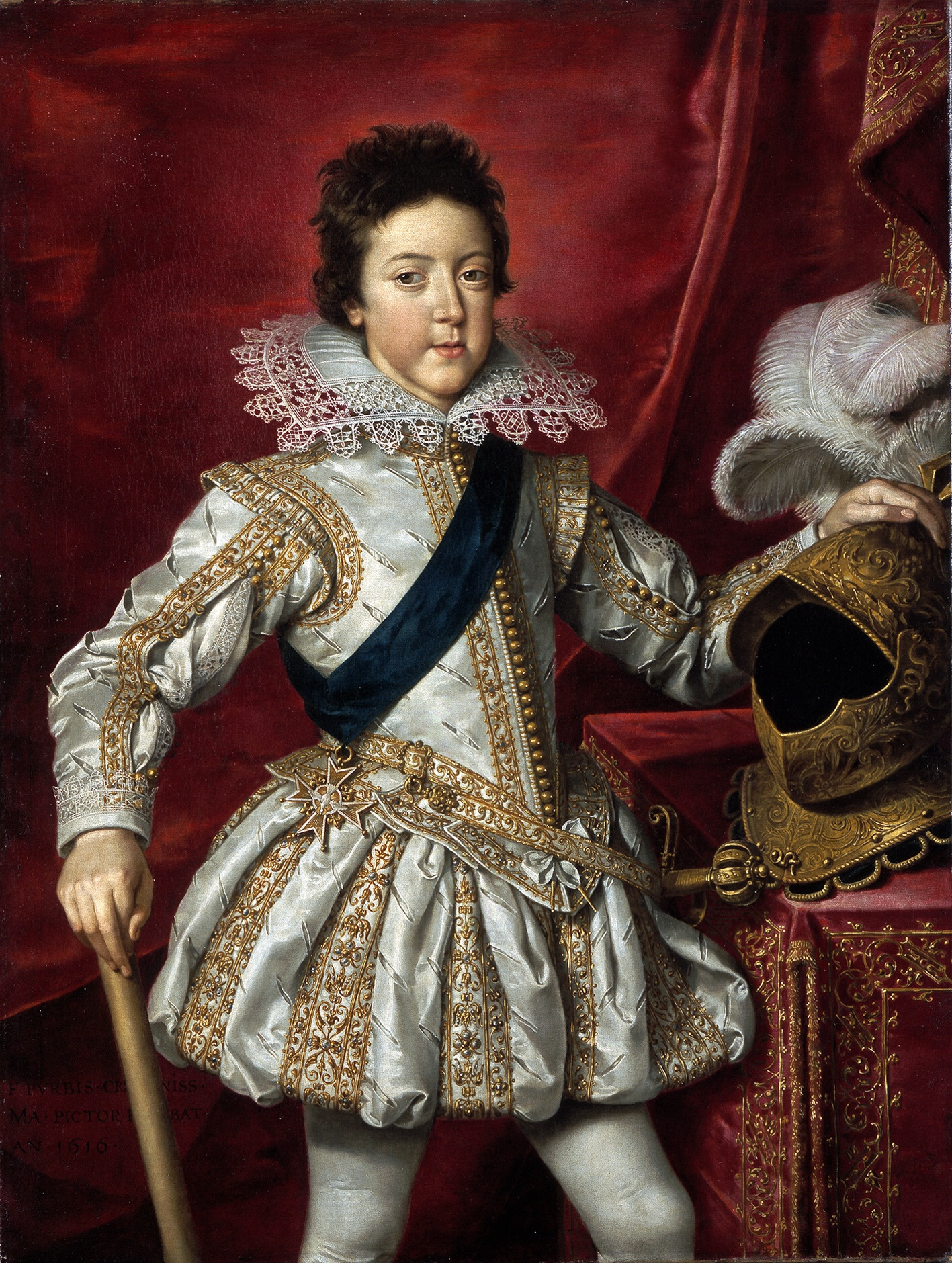
The Dauphin of France and future king Louis XIII who succeeded Montpensier as governor of Normandie at the age of 7

Despite the low esteem in which the king held him, the seniority of his relation to the royal line ensured that he held a regular place on the royal council during the years of Henri's reign.

On 27 February 1608, Montpensier died. He was succeeded as governor of Normandie by the dauphin of France.

== Sources ==
- Babelon, Jean-Pierre (2009). Henri IV. Fayard.
- Boltanski, Ariane (2006). Les ducs de Nevers et l'État royal: genèse d'un compromis (ca 1550 - ca 1600). Librairie Droz.
- Carroll, Stuart (2011). Martyrs and Murderers: The Guise Family and the Making of Europe. Oxford University Press.
- Constant, Jean-Marie (1996). La Ligue. Fayard.
- Harding, Robert (1978). Anatomy of a Power Elite: the Provincial Governors in Early Modern France. Yale University Press.
- Jouanna, Arlette (1998). Histoire et Dictionnaire des Guerres de Religion. Bouquins.
- Knecht, Robert (2016). Hero or Tyrant? Henry III, King of France, 1574-1589. Routledge.
- Le Roux, Nicolas (2000). La Faveur du Roi: Mignons et Courtisans au Temps des Derniers Valois. Champ Vallon.
- Le Roux, Nicolas (2006). Un Régicide au nom de Dieu: L'Assassinat d'Henri III. Gallimard.
- Pitts, Vincent (2012). Henri IV of France: His Reign and Age. Johns Hopkins University Press.
- Roberts, Penny (1996). A City in Conflict: Troyes during the French Wars of Religion. Manchester University Press.
- Salmon, J.H.M (1979). Society in Crisis: France during the Sixteenth Century. Metheun & Co.
