= Henri, Duke of Joyeuse =

French Duke and Military Commander (1563–1608)

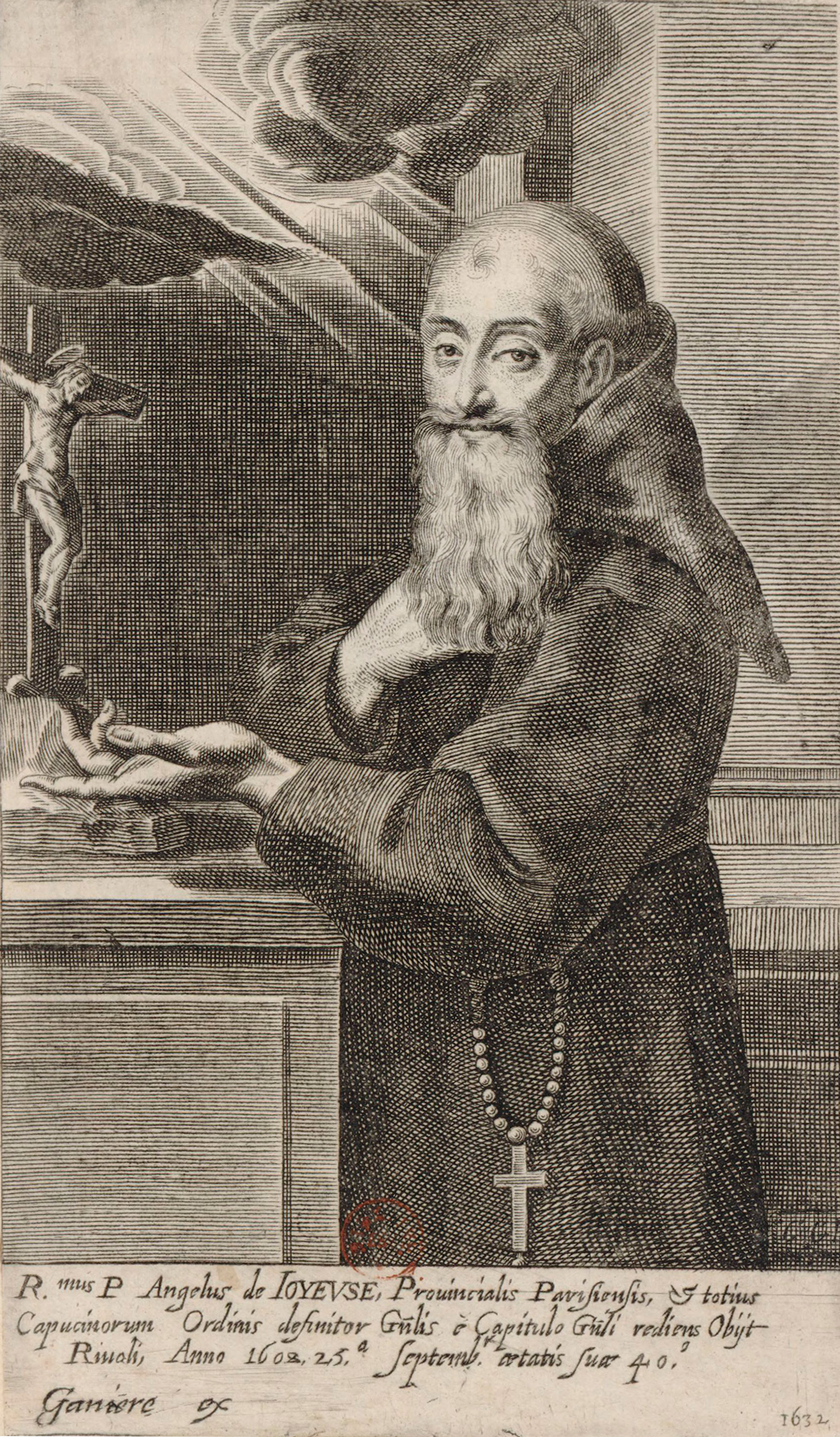
Henri de Joyeuse

Henri, Duc de Joyeuse (Toulouse, 21 September 1563 – Rivoli, 28 September 1608) was the youngest brother of Anne de Joyeuse and François de Joyeuse. He was a General in the French Wars of Religion and a member of the Catholic League, who became ordained as a Capuchin after the death of his wife, Catherine de La Valette.

After another of his brothers, Scipion, drowned himself in the Tarn after the defeat of Villemur in 1592, his title of Duke of Joyeuse was passed to Henri. The pope then released him from his vows and he was later appointed a Marshal of France. However he rejoined the Capuchins in 1599.

When he died in 1608, the title passed to Henri's daughter Henriette, who had married Henri de Montpensier in 1597.
