= Cecilia of Rome =

Christian Virgin martyr and saint

Saint Cecilia
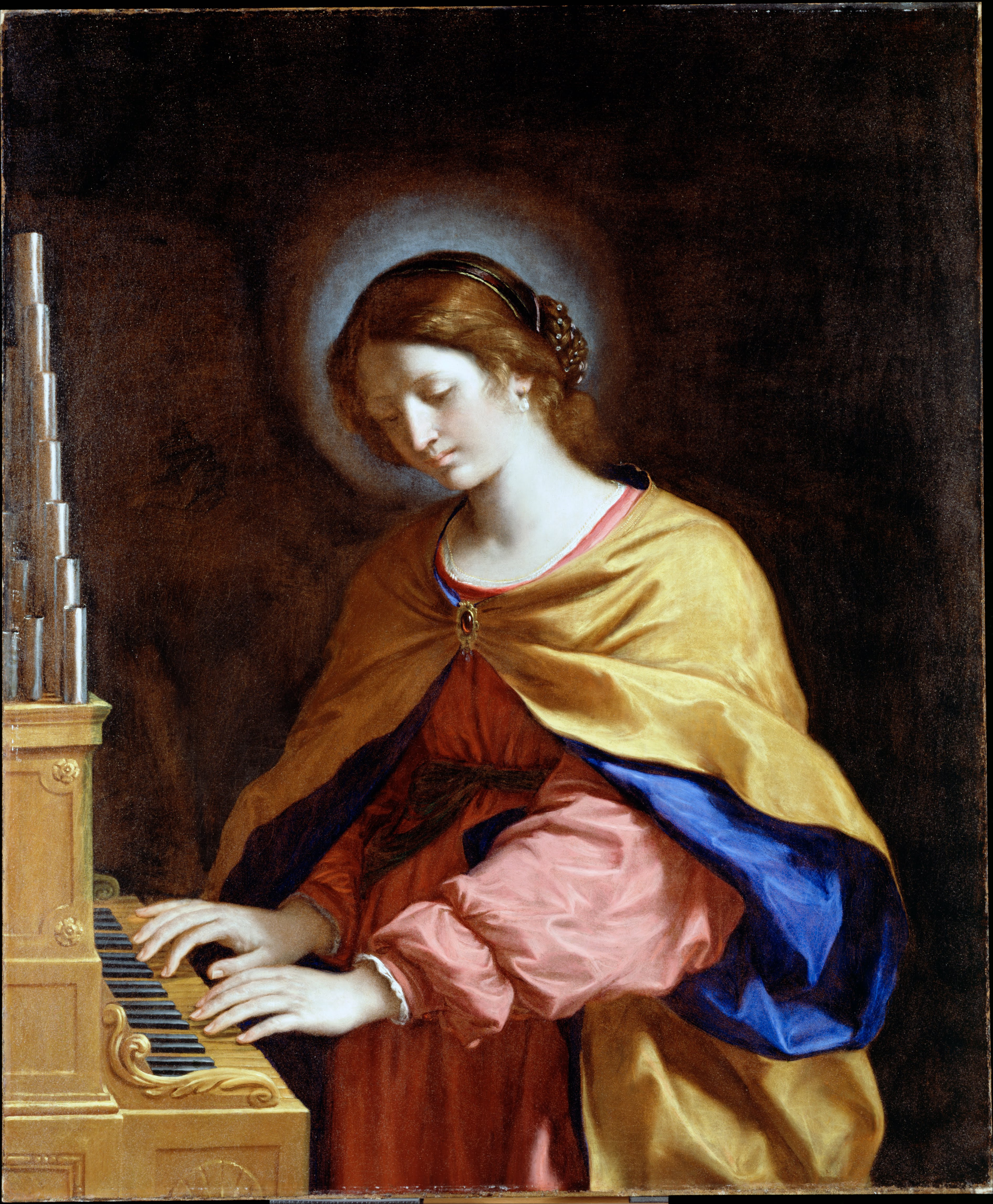
- Saint Cecilia playing the pipe organ, by Antonio Franchi, 1749.

Virgin and martyr
- Born: 200–230 AD; Rome
- Died: 222–235 AD; Rome
- Venerated in: Catholic Church; Eastern Orthodox Church; Anglican Communion; Lutheran churches
- Major shrine: Santa Cecilia in Trastevere, Rome
- Feast: 22 November
- Attributes: Flute, organ, roses, violin, harp, harpsichord, songbird, singing
- Patronage: Sacred music; organ builders; luthiers; singers; musicians; poets; Archdiocese of Omaha; Albi, France; Mar del Plata, Argentina

Cecilia of Rome was a Christian virgin martyr, who is venerated in Roman Catholic, Eastern Orthodox, Anglican, and some Lutheran churches, such as the Church of Sweden. She became the patron saint of music and musicians, it being written that, as the musicians played at her wedding, Cecilia "sang in her heart to the Lord." Musical compositions are dedicated to her, and her feast, on 22 November, is the occasion of concerts and musical festivals.

Cecilia is one of several virgin martyrs commemorated by name in the Canon of the Mass in the Latin Church. The church of Santa Cecilia in Trastevere, founded in the 3rd century by Pope Urban I, is believed to be on the site of the house where she lived and died.

== Life ==
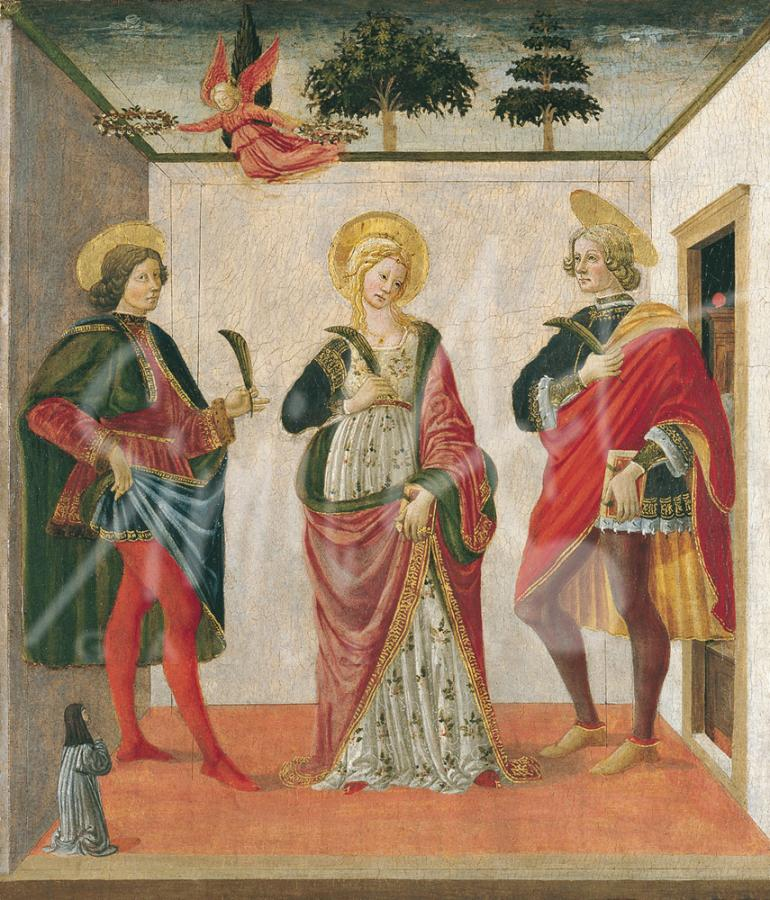
Saints Cecilia, Valerian, and Tiburtius by Botticini

It is popularly supposed that Cecilia was a noble woman of Rome who, with her husband Valerian, his brother Tiburtius, and a Roman soldier named Maximus, was martyred about 230, under the Emperor Alexander Severus. Giovanni Battista de Rossi, however, argues that instead she perished in Sicily under the Emperor Marcus Aurelius between 176 and 180, citing the report of Venantius Fortunatus, Bishop of Poitiers (d. 600).

According to the story, despite her vow of virginity, her parents forced her to marry a pagan nobleman named Valerian. During the wedding, Cecilia sat apart singing to God in her heart, and for that, she was later declared the saint of musicians. When the time came for her marriage to be consummated, Cecilia told Valerian that watching over her was an angel of the Lord, who would punish him if he sexually violated her but would love him if he respected her virginity. When Valerian asked to see the angel, Cecilia replied that he could see the angel if he would go to the third milestone on the Via Appia and be baptized by Pope Urban I. After following Cecilia's advice, he saw the angel standing beside her, crowning her with a wreath of roses and lilies.

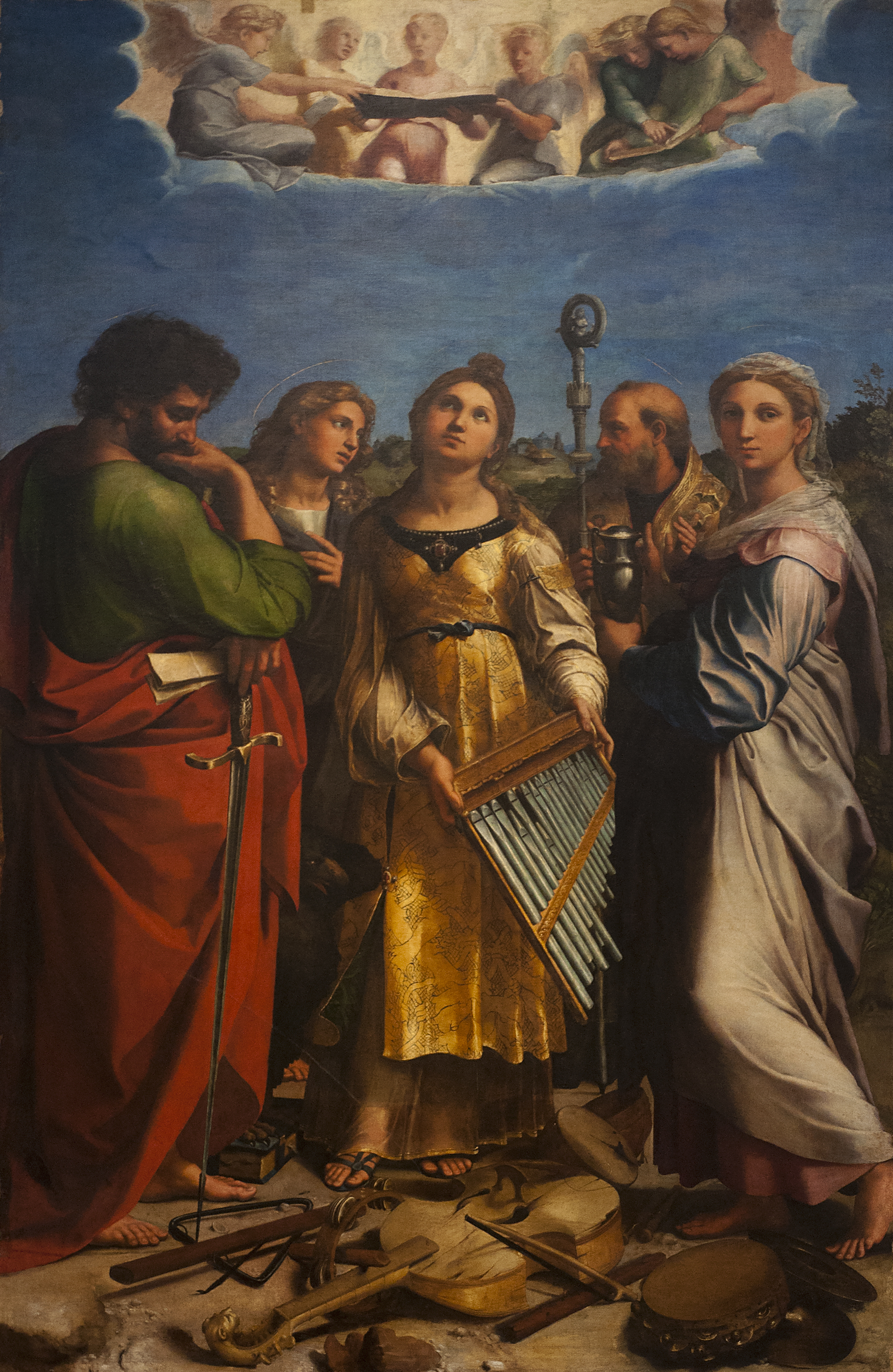
The Ecstasy of St. Cecilia by Raphael

The martyrdom of Cecilia is said to have followed that of her husband Valerian and his brother at the hands of the prefect Turcius Almachius. According to an ancient tradition, after being struck three times on the neck with a sword, she lived for three days, and asked the pope to convert her home into a church.

Cecilia was buried in the Catacomb of Callixtus and later transferred to the Church of Santa Cecilia in Trastevere. In 1599, her tomb was opened and, according to multiple witnesses, her body was found to be still incorrupt, and she seemed to be simply sleeping.

Cecilia is one of the most famous Roman martyrs, although some elements of the stories recounted about her do not appear in the source material. According to Johann Peter Kirsch, the existence of the martyr is a historical fact. At the same time, some details bear the mark of a pious fiction, like many other similar accounts compiled in the fifth and sixth centuries. The relation between Cecilia and Valerian, Tiburtius, and Maximus, mentioned in the Acts of the Martyrs, has some historical foundation. Her feast day has been celebrated since about the fourth century. There is no mention of Cecilia in the Depositio Martyrum, but there is a record of an early Roman church founded by a lady of this name, Santa Cecilia in Trastevere.

== Santa Cecilia in Trastevere ==
The church of Santa Cecilia in Trastevere is reputedly built on the site of the house in which she lived. The original church was constructed in the fourth century; during the ninth century, Pope Paschal I had remains that were supposedly hers buried there. In 1599, while leading a renovation of the church, Cardinal Paolo Emilio Sfondrati had the remains, which he reported to be incorrupt, excavated and reburied.

== Name ==
The name "Cecilia" applied generally to Roman women who belonged to the plebeian clan of the Caecilii. Legends and hagiographies, mistaking it for a personal name, suggest fanciful etymologies. Among those cited by Chaucer in "The Second Nun's Tale" are: lily of heaven, the way for the blind, contemplation of heaven and the active life, as if lacking in blindness, and a heaven for people to gaze upon.

== Patron of musicians ==
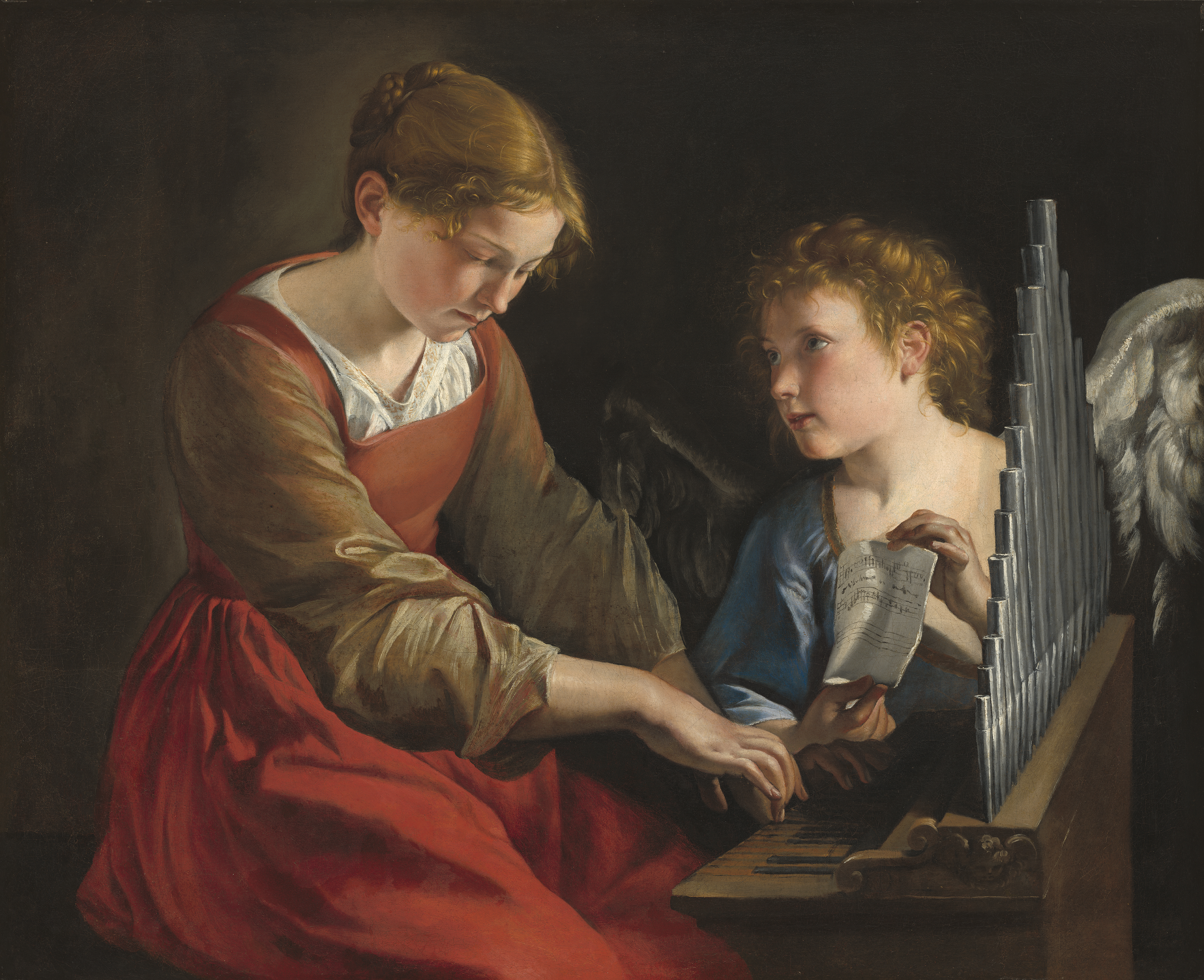
Orazio Gentileschi and Giovanni Lanfranco, Saint Cecilia and an Angel, c. 1617–1618 and c. 1621–1627, National Gallery of Art, Washington, D.C.

The first record of a music festival in her honour was held at Évreux in Normandy in 1570.

The Accademia Nazionale di Santa Cecilia in Rome is one of the oldest musical institutions in the world. It was founded by the papal bull, Ratione congruit, issued by Sixtus V in 1585, which invoked two saints prominent in Western musical history: Gregory the Great, after whom Gregorian chant is named, and Cecilia, the patron saint of music.

Her feast day became an occasion for musical concerts and festivals that occasioned well-known poems by John Dryden and Alexander Pope and music by Henry Purcell (Ode to St. Cecilia); three different oratorios by Marc-Antoine Charpentier, Caecilia virgo et martyr octo vocibus H.397, for soloists, double chorus, double string orchestra and bc, Cecilia virgo et martyr H.413, for soloists, chorus, two treble instruments and bc, and Caecilia virgo et martyr H.415, for soloists, chorus, two treble instruments and bc, to libretti probably written by Philippe Goibaut); George Frideric Handel (Ode for St. Cecilia's Day; Alexander's Feast); Charles Gounod (St. Cecilia Mass); as well as Benjamin Britten, who was born on her feast day (Hymn to St Cecilia, based on a poem by W. H. Auden). Herbert Howells' A Hymn to Saint Cecilia has words by Ursula Vaughan Williams; Gerald Finzi's "For Saint Cecilia," Op. 30, was set to verses written by Edmund Blunden; Michael Hurd's 1966 composition "A Hymn to Saint Cecilia" sets John Dryden's poem; and Frederik Magle's Cantata to Saint Cecilia is based on the history of Cecilia. The Heavenly Life, a poem from Des Knaben Wunderhorn (which Gustav Mahler used in his Symphony No. 4) mentions that "Cecilia and all her relations make excellent court musicians."

From the name of Cecilia comes Cecyliada, the name of the festival of sacred, choral, and contemporary music, held from 1994 in Police, Poland.

== Legacy ==
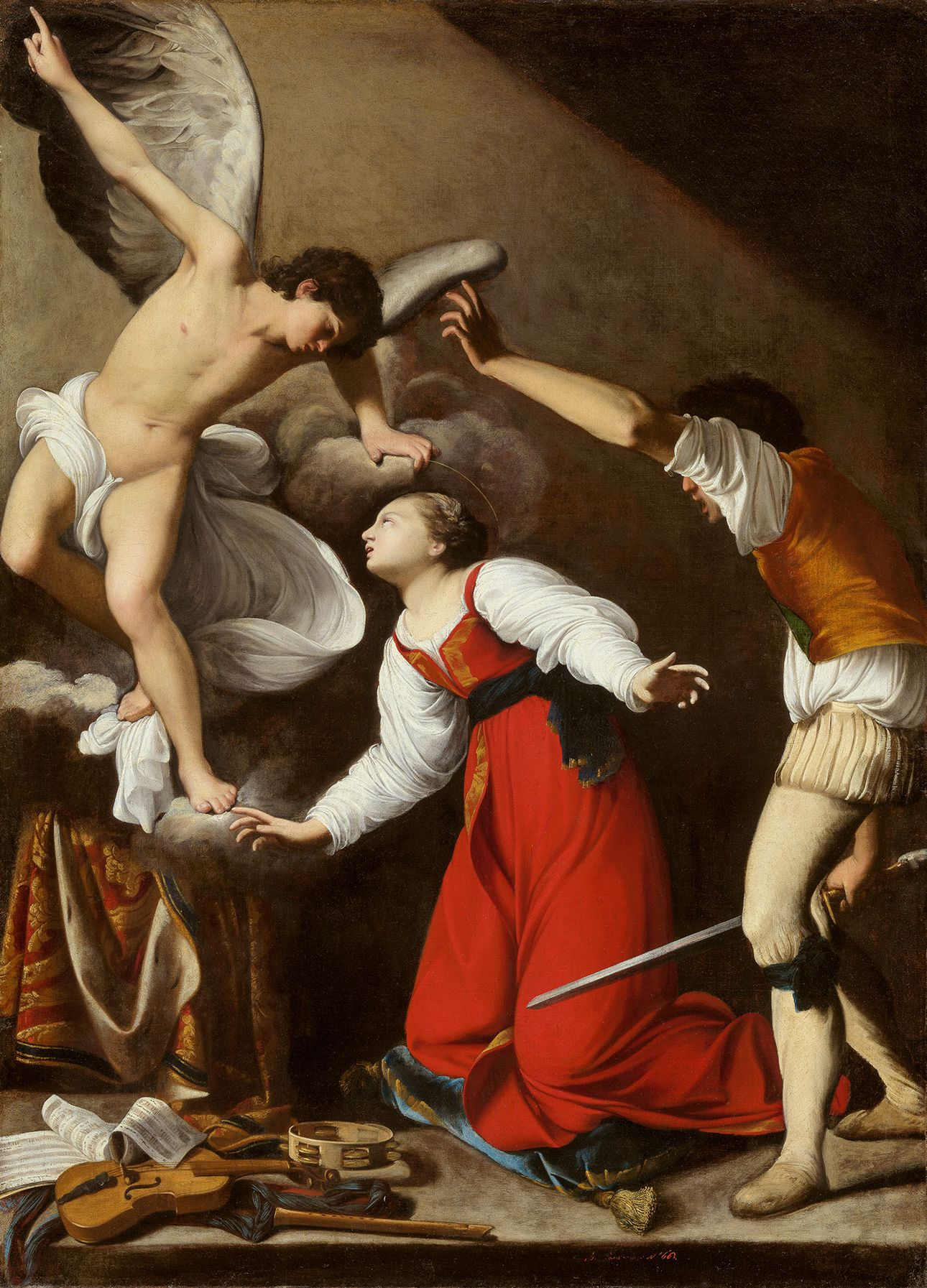
The Martyrdom of St Cecilia by Carlo Saraceni (c. 1610)

Cecilia symbolizes the central role of music in the liturgy.

The Cistercian nuns of the convent nearby Santa Cecilia in Trastevere shear lambs' wool to be woven in the palliums of new metropolitan archbishops. The lambs are raised by the Trappists of the Abbey Tre Fontane in Rome. The Pope blesses the lambs every 21 January, the Feast of Saint Agnes. The pallia are given by the Pope to the new metropolitan archbishops on the Solemnity of Saints Peter and Paul, 29 June.

Located on the Isle of Wight, St. Cecilia's Abbey, Ryde was founded in 1882. The nuns live a traditional monastic life of prayer, work, and study in accordance with the ancient Rule of Saint Benedict.

The famous luthier Jean-Baptiste Vuillaume produces a line of violin and viola under the name St. Cécile with a decal stamped on the upper back.

Cecilia is remembered in the Church of England with a commemoration on 22 November. She is honored on the Episcopal Church liturgical calendar with Agnes of Rome on 21 January.

Croatian journal for church music Sveta Cecilija is named after her. It is published since 1877.

== Iconography ==
Cecilia is frequently depicted playing the viola, a portative organ, or other musical instruments, evidently to express what was often attributed to her, namely that while the musicians played at her nuptials, she sang in her heart to God. The organ, however, may be misattributed to her as the result of a mistranslation.

A miniature Saint Cecilia beneath Worcester Cathedral was featured on the reverse side of the Sir Edward Elgar £20 banknote, which was withdrawn by the Bank of England in 2010.

== In music ==
=== Renaissance, baroque and classical music ===
- Marc-Antoine Charpentier composed four Histoires sacrées using a text thought to have been written by his colleague Philippe Goibaut des Bois La Grugère:
  - In honorem Caeciliae, Valeriani et Tiburtij canticum H.394 for three voices, two treble instruments, and continuo (1675 ?).
  - Caecilia virgo et martyr octo vocibus H.397 for soloists, double chorus, double orchestra, and continuo (1677–78).
  - Caecilia virgo et martyr, H.413 for soloists, chorus, and two treble instruments (1683–85).
  - Caecilia virgo et martyr H.415 – H.415 a for soloists, chorus, and two treble instruments (1686).
- Henry Purcell, Laudate Ceciliam (1683), Welcome to all the pleasures (1683), Raise, raise the voice (c1685) and Hail! Bright Cecilia (1692).
- Sébastien de Brossard, "Canticle for Saint Cécila" SdB.9 (1720 ?)
- Alessandro Scarlatti Il martirio di santa Cecilia, oratorio donné pour la première fois le 1^{er} mars 1708; Messa di Santa Cecilia(1720).
- Georg Friedrich Händel composed two works for Saint Cecilia with John Dryden: The Oratorio Alexander's Feast or The Power of Music (1736) and Ode for St. Cecilia's Day (1739).
- Joseph Haydn, Missa Sanctae Caeciliae ou Missa Cellensis in honorem Beatissimae Virginis Mariae (1766–67).
- Ferdinand Hiller, St. Cäcilia (1848), cantata for soloists and orchestra to the text by Wolfgang Müller von Königswinter.
- Charles Gounod, Hymne à Sainte Cécile, CG 557 (1865) for solo violin and orchestra
- Julius Benedict, Legend of Saint Cecilia (premiered 1866)

=== Contemporary music ===
- Judith Shatin wrote The Passion of Saint Cecilia for piano and orchestra and Fantasy on Saint Cecilia for solo piano.
- Fred Momotenko composed "Cecilia", a composition for full mixed choir, "a hymn to the past as well as to the future of the monastic tradition." The world premiere was at Koningshoeven Abbey on Saint Cecilia's feast day, 2014.
- Benjamin Britten wrote Hymn to St Cecilia, a setting for the poem by W. H. Auden.
- Paul Simon wrote the 1970 song "Cecilia" which title refers to the patron saint of music. The song's chorus line was sampled by The Vamps in their 2014 single Oh Cecilia.
- Lou Harrison wrote his Mass for St. Cecilia's Day for choir, harp, and drone (1983–86).
- Stalk-Forrest Group (later name changed to Blue Öyster Cult), recorded the song "St. Cecilia." The EP was later released under the SFG name as the St. Cecilia Sessions.
- Arvo Pärt was commissioned to compose a work for the Great Jubilee in Rome in 2000, and wrote Cecilia, vergine romana (Cecilia, Roman virgin) for mixed choir and orchestra. The Italian text deals with the saint's life and martyrdom. It was first performed on 19 November 2000, close to her feast day, by the Accademia Nazionale di Santa Cecilia conducted by Myung-whun Chung.
- Gerald Finzi composed "For St. Cecilia" for solo tenor, chorus (SATB), and orchestra. Setting of a work by English poet and author Edmund Blunden. Duration ca 18 minutes.
- Herbert Howells composed his "A Hymn for Saint Cecilia" for choir and organ in 1960, as commissioned by the Worshipful Company of Musicians, with a text by Ursula Vaughan Williams.
- On the 2015 Feast of Saint Cecilia, Foo Fighters released their EP Saint Cecilia for free download via their website. The five-song EP features the title song "Saint Cecilia." The EP was recorded during an impromptu studio session at Hotel Saint Cecilia located in Austin, Texas.
- Informator Choristarum (organist and master of the choristers) at Magdalen College, Oxford (1957–1981), Bernard Rose's unaccompanied anthem for SATB choir (with divisions) Feast Song For St. Cecilia (1974) is a setting a poem of the same name by his son, musician Gregory Rose.
- E. Florence Whitlock composed Ode to St. Cecilia, Opus 5, based on text by John Dryden, in 1958.
- Singer/Songwriter/Guitarist, Rik Emmett, composed the song "Calling St. Cecilia" on his 1992 LP Ipso Facto.
- Blue Öyster Cult released the song "The Return of St. Cecilia," on their 2020 album The Symbol Remains.
- In the pop opera Bare, the catholic school is named St. Cecilia's.
- The Chicago band Turnt (now known as Everybody All The Time) released a song called "Girls" which refers to St Cecilia in the lyrics. The song was first performed at Northwestern University's Mayfest Battle of the Bands on Friday 24 May 2013 at 27 Live in downtown Evanston.
- On 2008 Brian Eno's and David Byrne's album Everything That Happens Will Happen Today, Cecilia is referred to in the song "The River."
- Iceage release song “Dear Saint Cecilia” on their 2021 album Seek Shelter.
- British pop band The Vamps released the song "Oh Cecilia (Breaking My Heart)" on their 2014 debut studio album Meet the Vamps.
- Welsh rock band Holding Absence released the song "Saint Cecilia" on the split EP "This Is as One" with British metal band Loathe in 2018.

== Cultural references ==
- The poem "Moschus Moschiferus," by Australian poet A. D. Hope (1907–2000), is subtitled "A Song for St Cecilia's Day." The poem is of 12 stanzas and was written in the 1960s.
- Geoffrey Chaucer retells the story of Cecilia and Valerian and his brother in "The Second Nun's Tale" in The Canterbury Tales.
- Cecilia is a symbol for the divine power of music in Heinrich von Kleist's extended anecdote "St. Cecilia, or the Power of Music."
- In the Japanese manga and anime series Saint Cecilia and Pastor Lawrence, the main character's name is inspired from Saint Cecilia
- In the episodic survival horror video game Song of Horror, the entirety of episode 4 takes place in the fictional St. Cecilia's Abbey.
- Croatian writer Mario Volf (pseudonym: Martin Tower) wrote biographical novel Sveta Cecilija ("Saint Cecilia").
- In the scripted comedy podcast "Confessions of a Catholic Single" the main character is named Cecilia, after the Saint. One of the other main characters is named Agnes, after St. Agnes of Rome.
- In the 2025 mockumentary film Spinal Tap II: The End Continues, the band’s promoter Simon Howler claims he suffers from so-called St. Cecilia’s Curse making him unable to comprehend music.

== Gallery ==
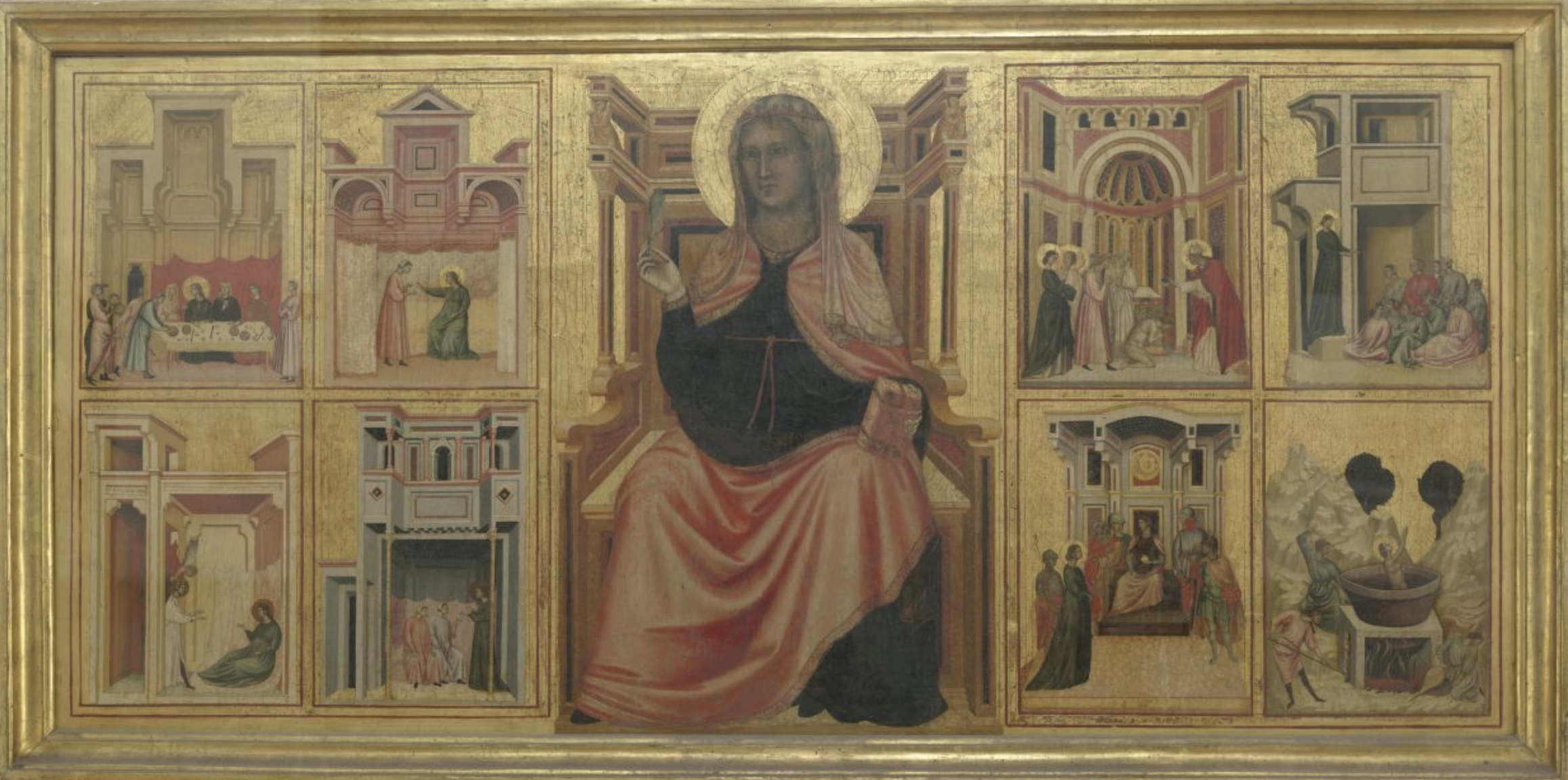
Master of St. Cecilia, Saint Cecilia Altarpiece (1305-1310)

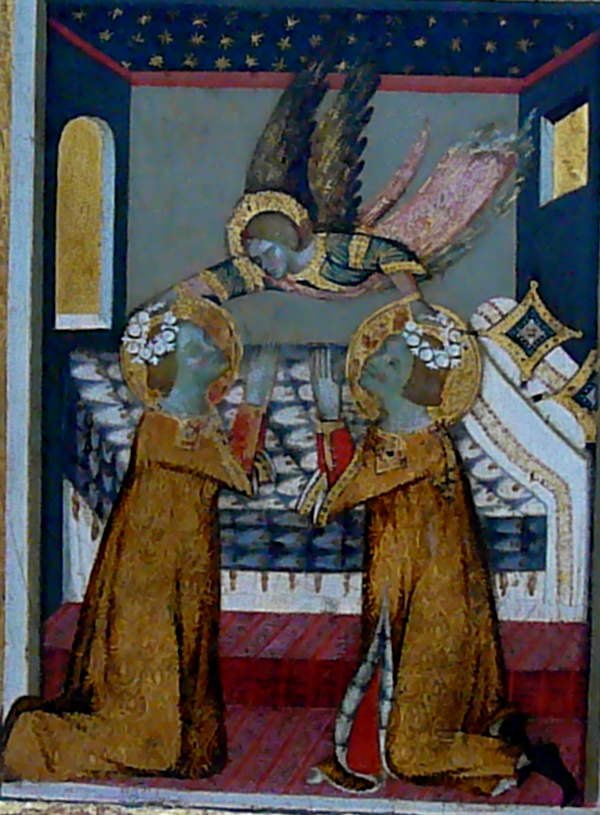
An Angel Crowning Saints Cecilia and Valerian (1330s)

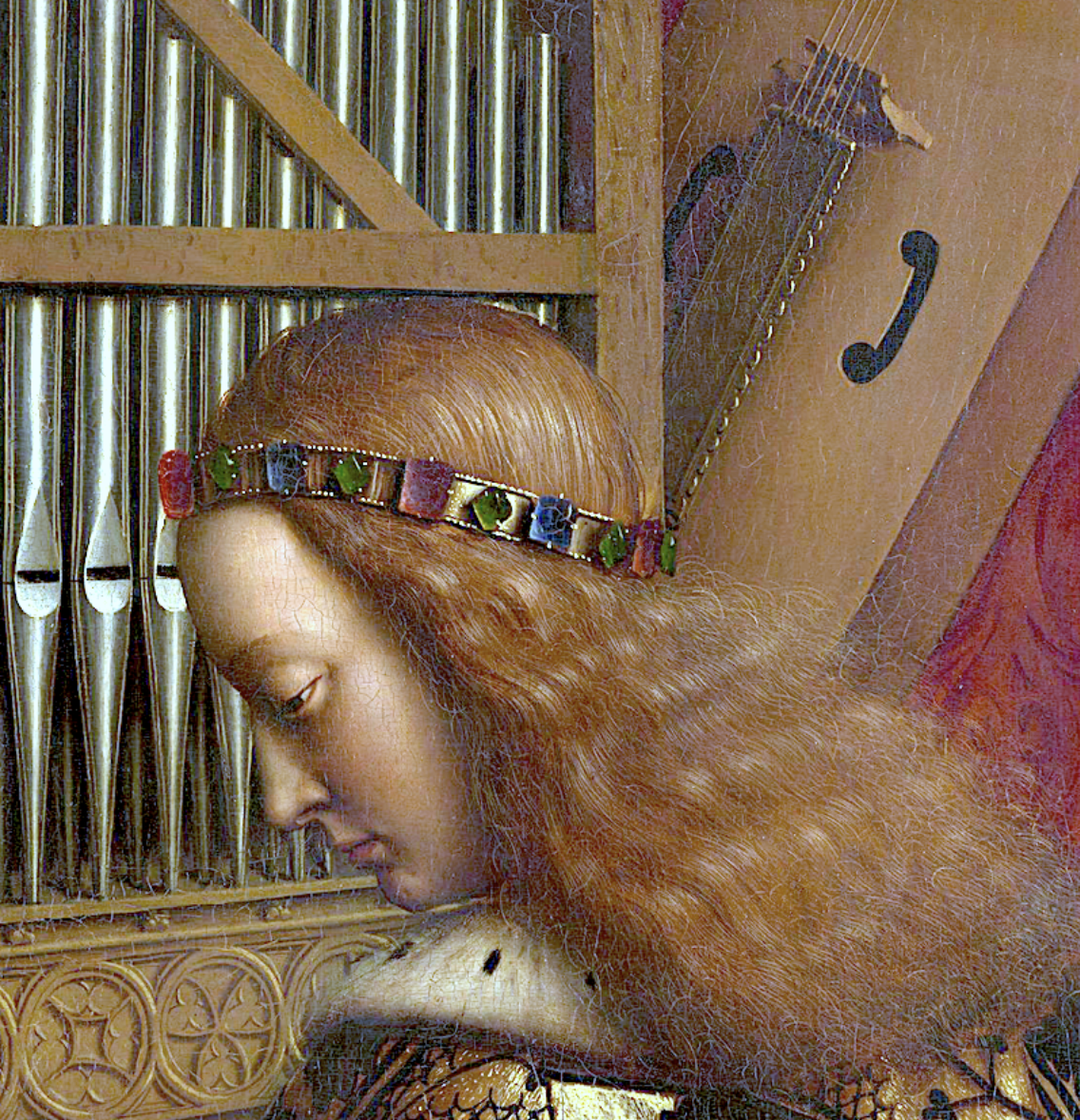
Jan and Hubert Van Eyck, Ghent Altarpiece, detail of St. Cecilia (1432)

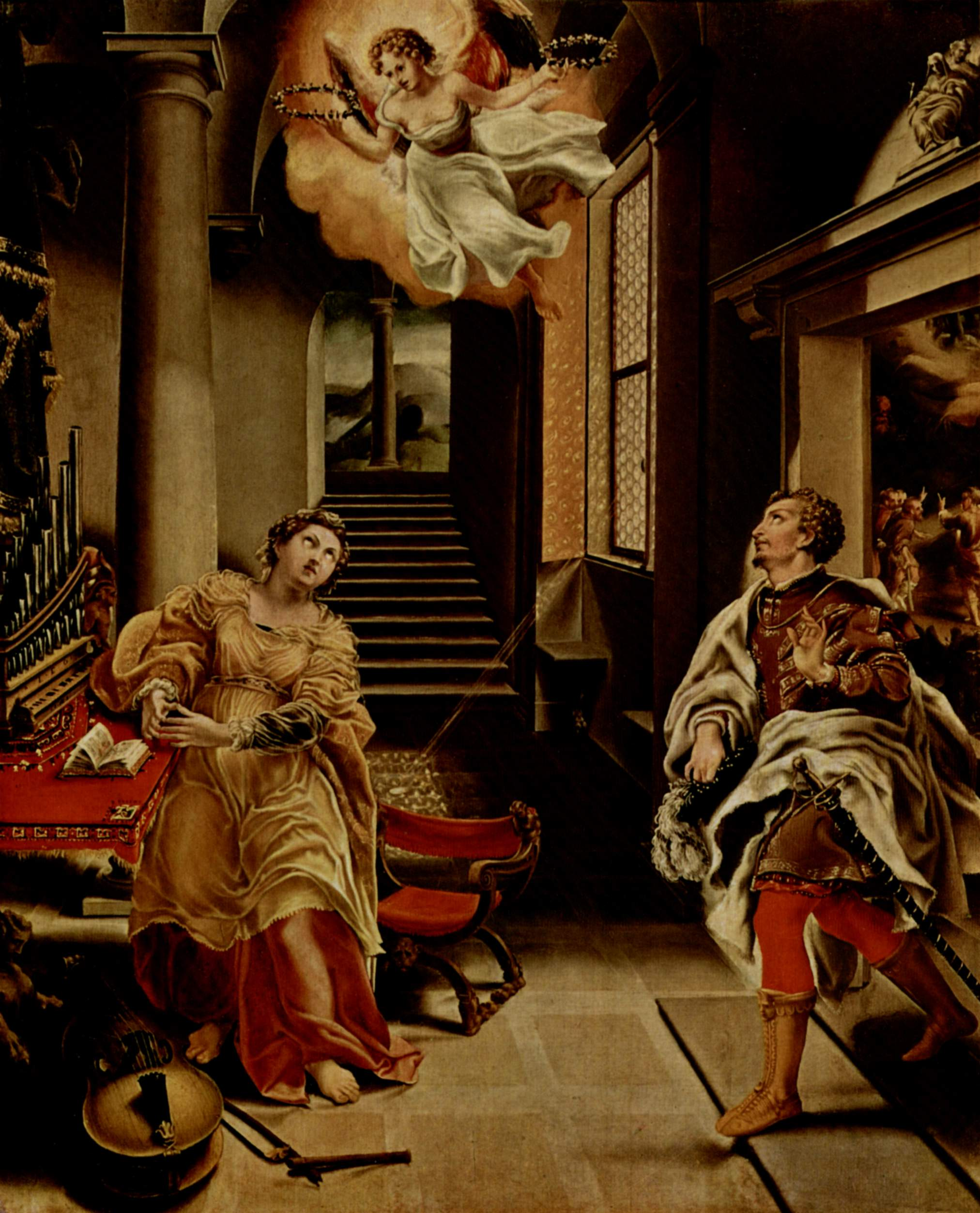
Saint Cecilia and Saint Valerian, Lelio Orsi (c. 1555)

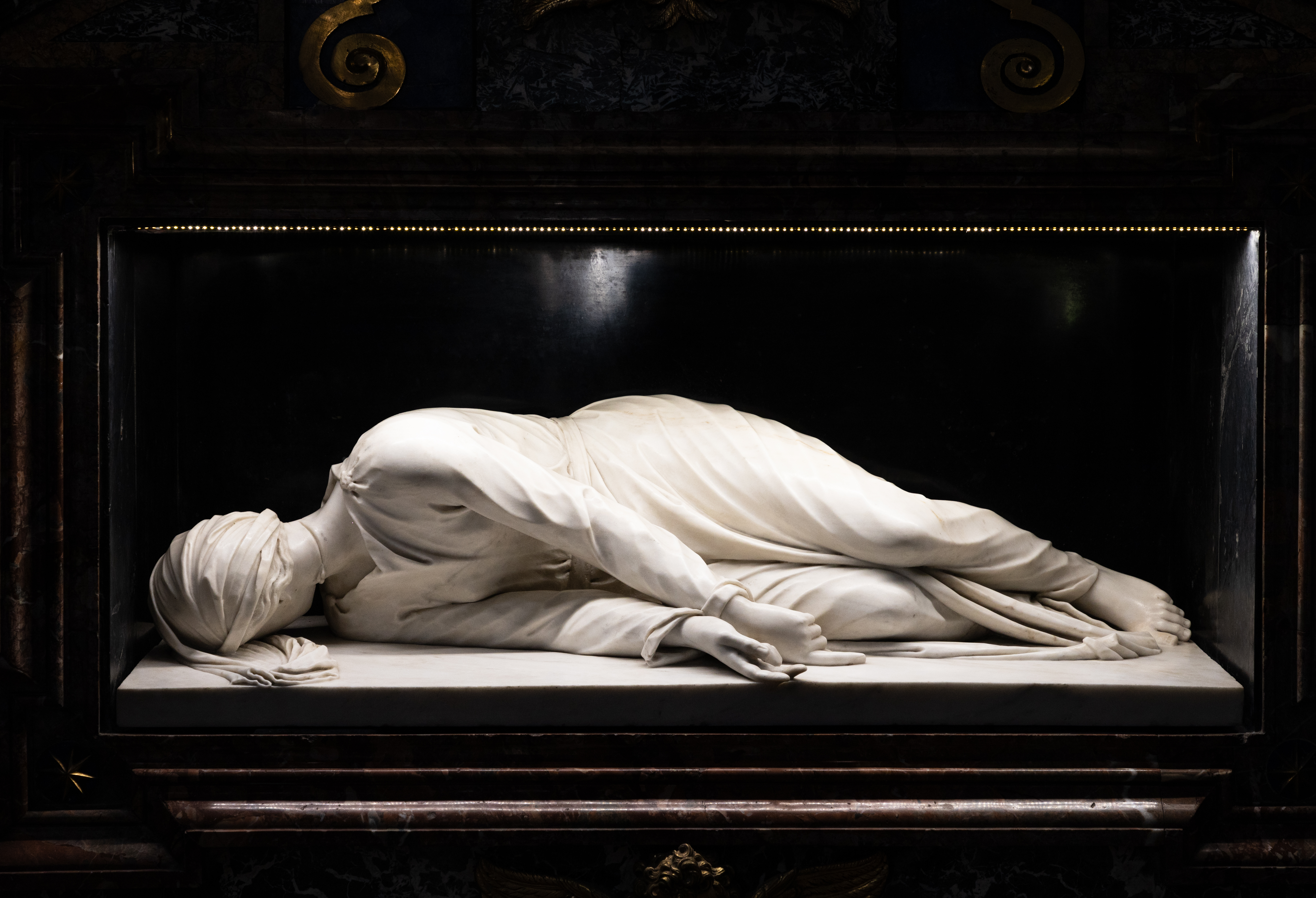
Stefano Maderno, St. Cecilia, 1599

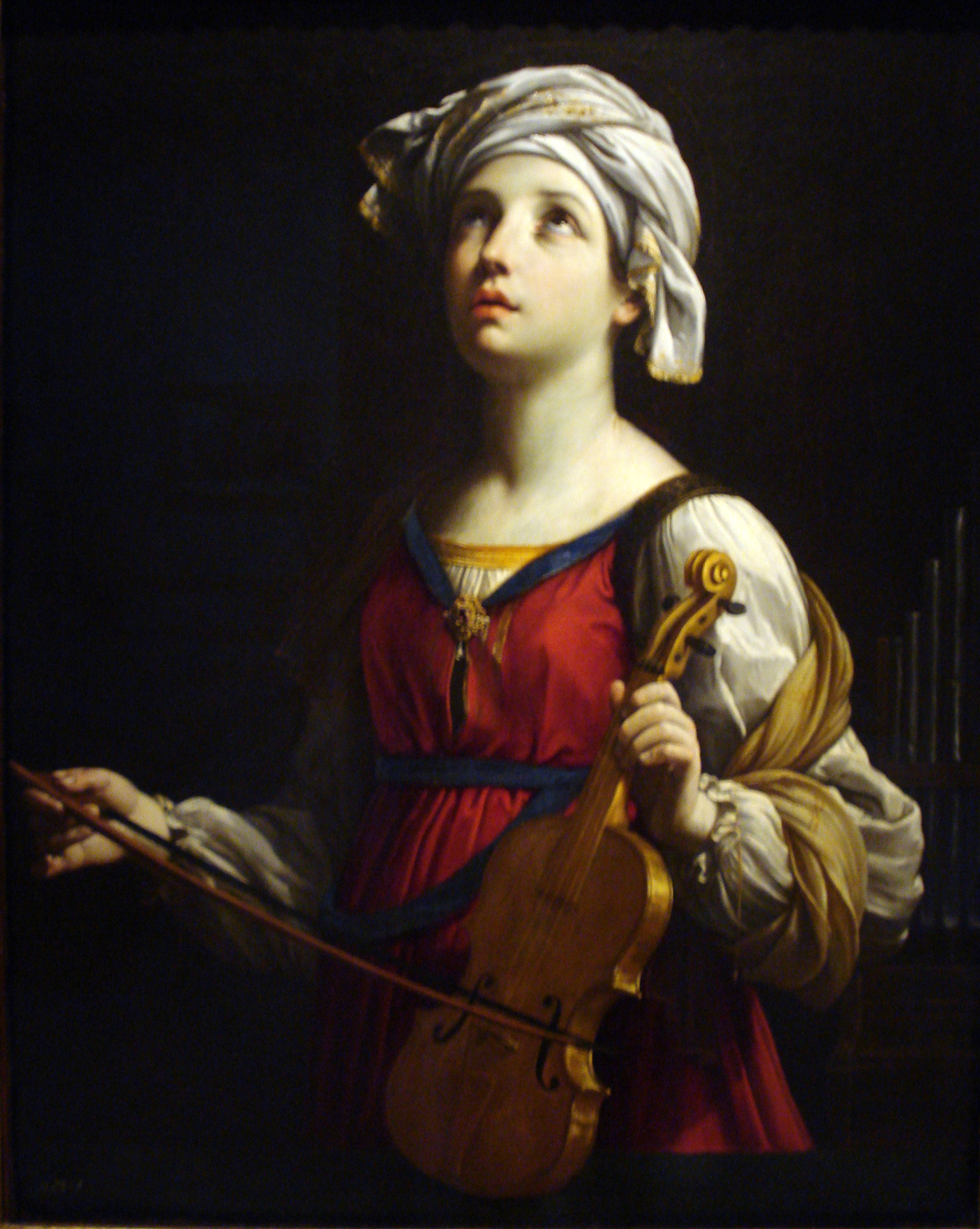
Guido Reni, Saint Cecilia (1606)

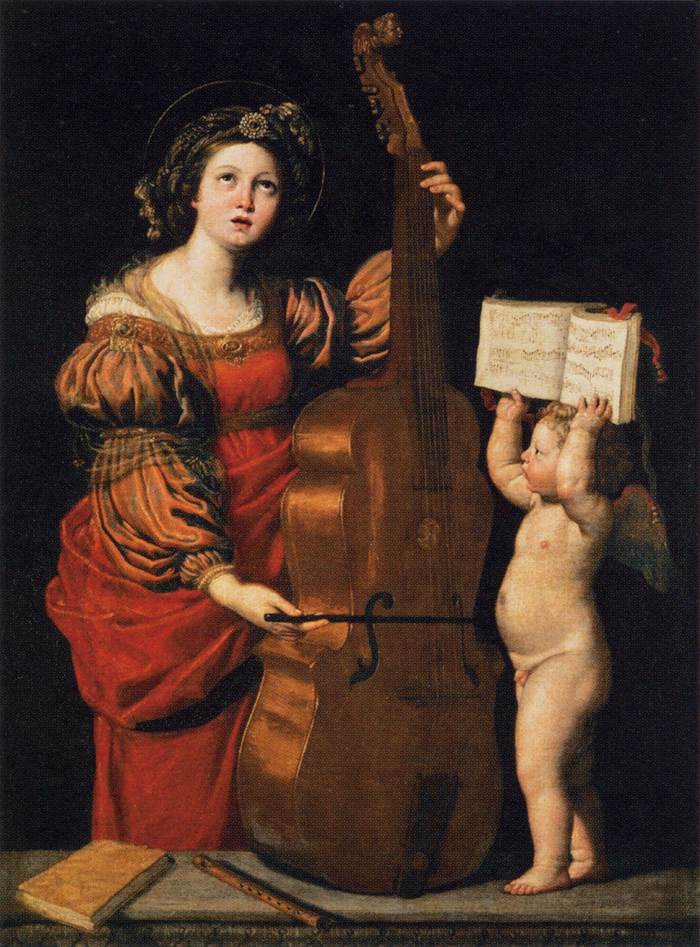
Domenichino, Saint Cecilia with an angel holding a musical score, (c. 1617–18).

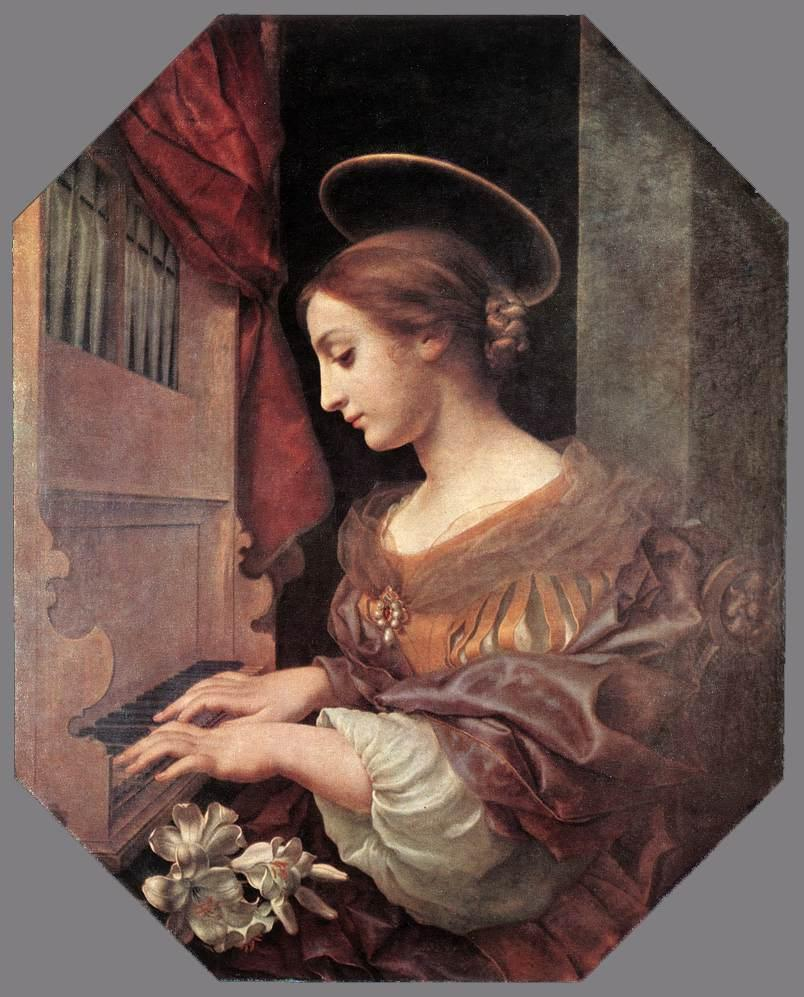
Carlo Dolci, St Cecilia at the Organ (1665-1677)

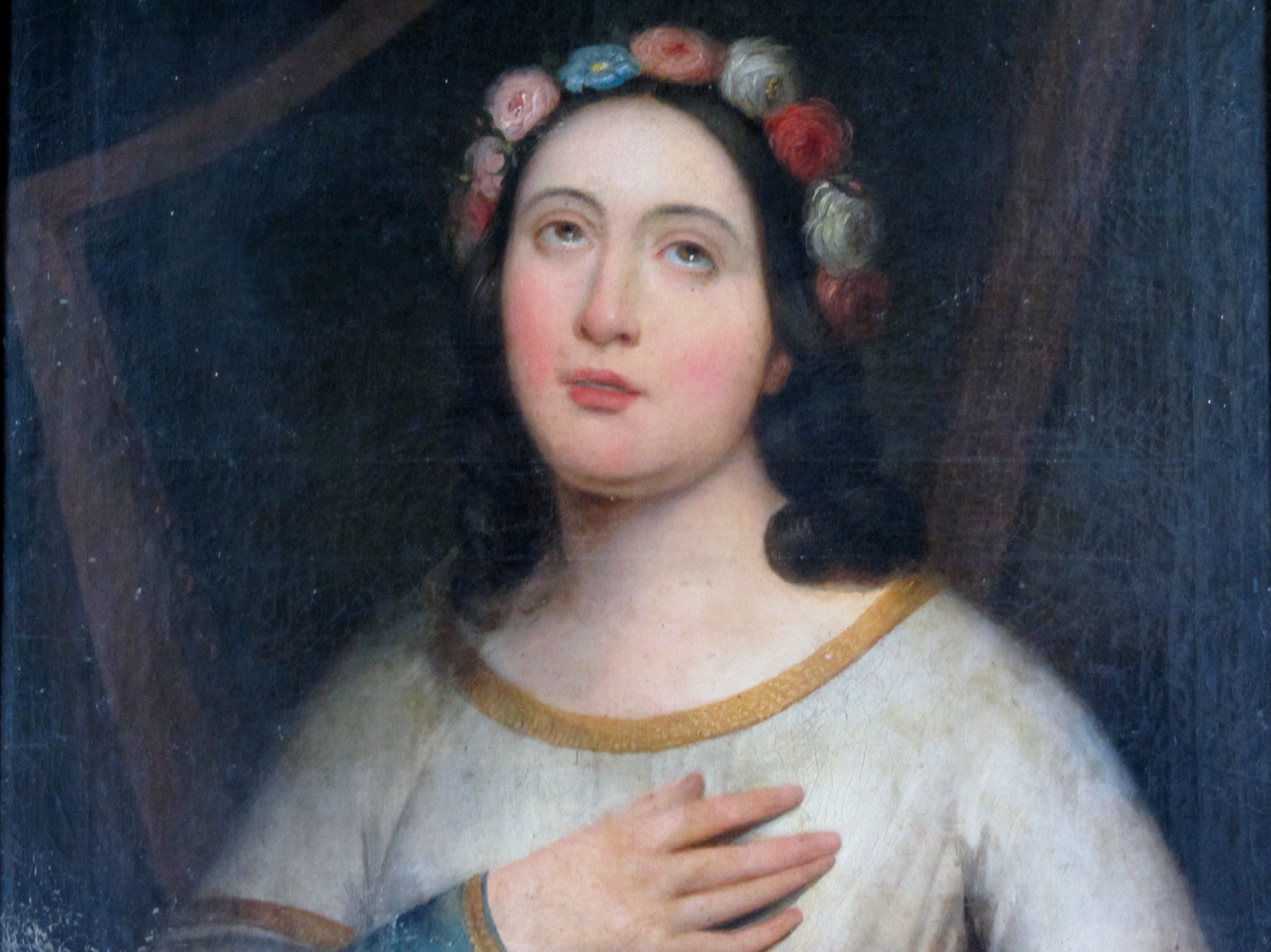
Saint Cecilia by Raymond Monvoisin

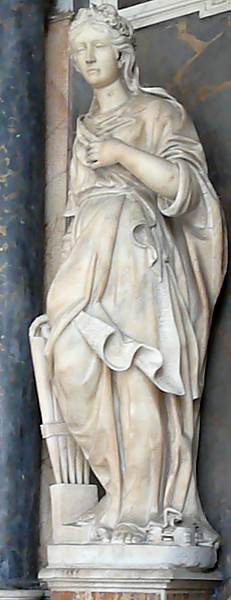
Statue from the porch of St. Cecilia, Trastevere

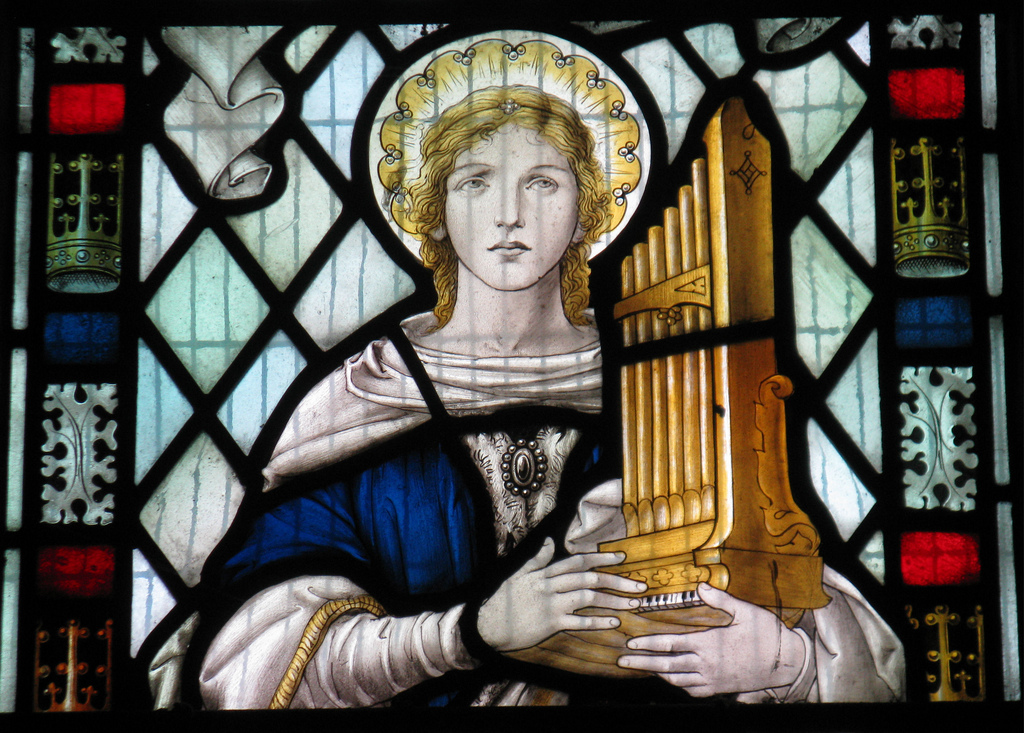
Saint Cecilia Wymondley

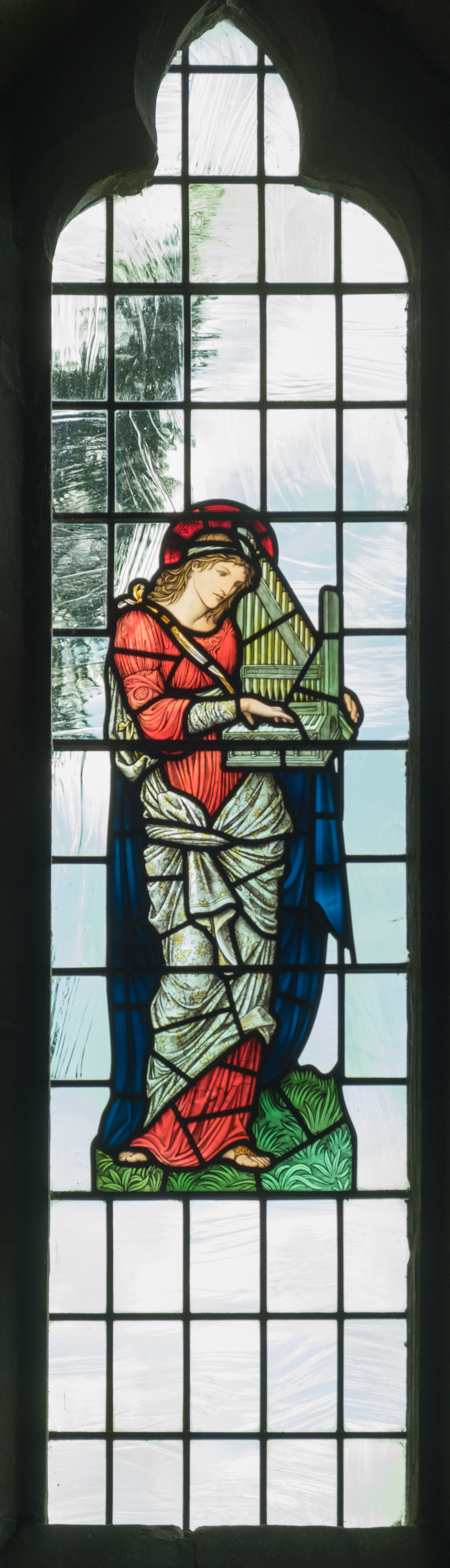
Saint Cecilia stained glass by Edward Burne-Jones in All Saints church, Preston Bagot

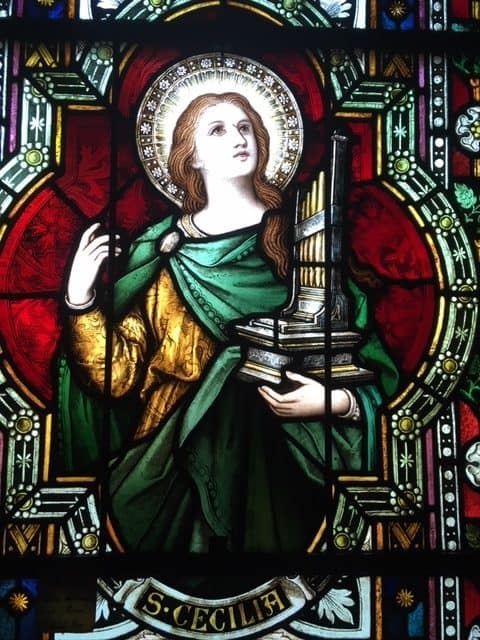
Franciscan Sisters' Saint Cecilia window inspires vocations at Saint Mary's Chapel, Holy Family Convent Motherhouse in Manitowoc, WI

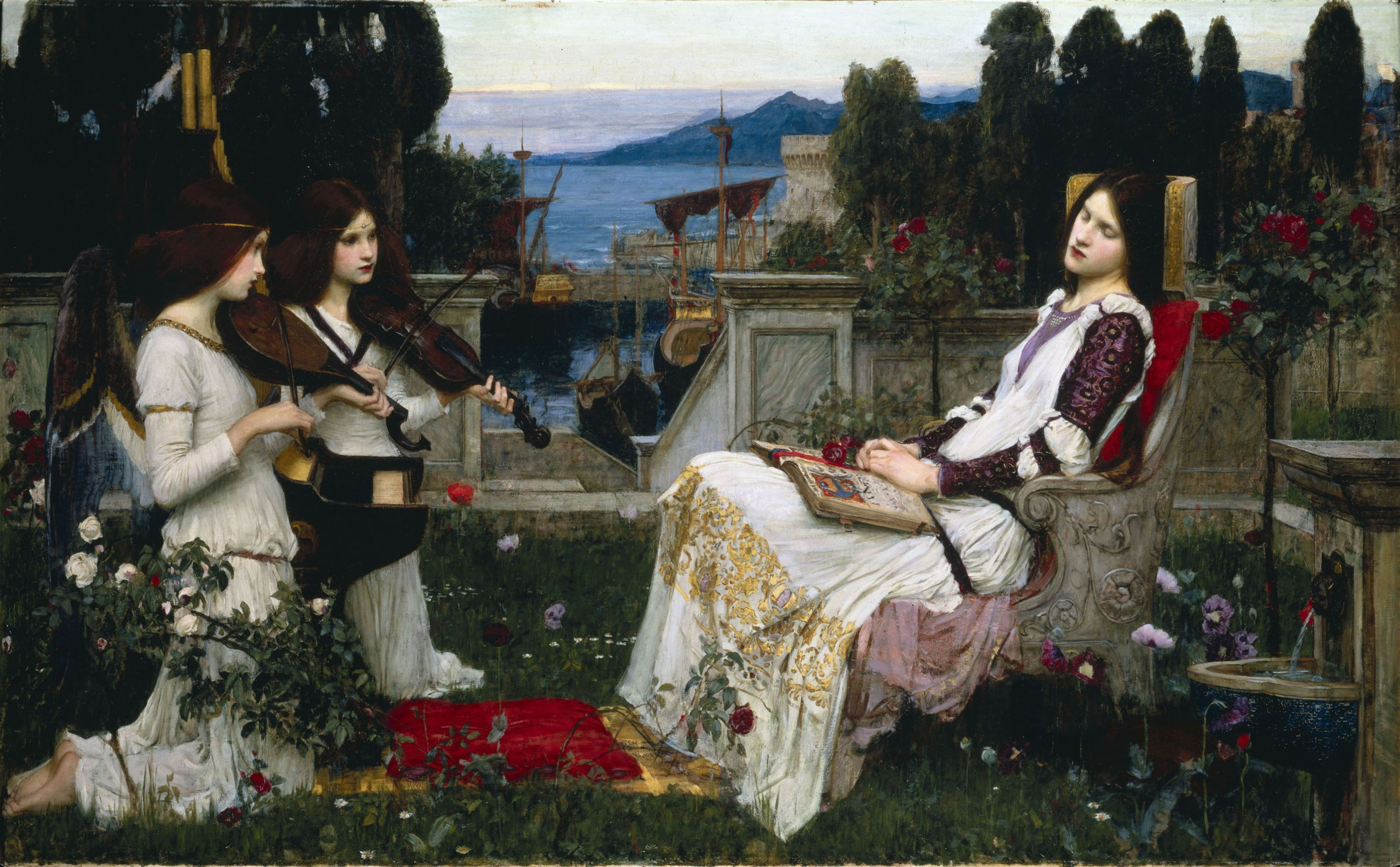
John William Waterhouse, Saint Cecilia (1895)

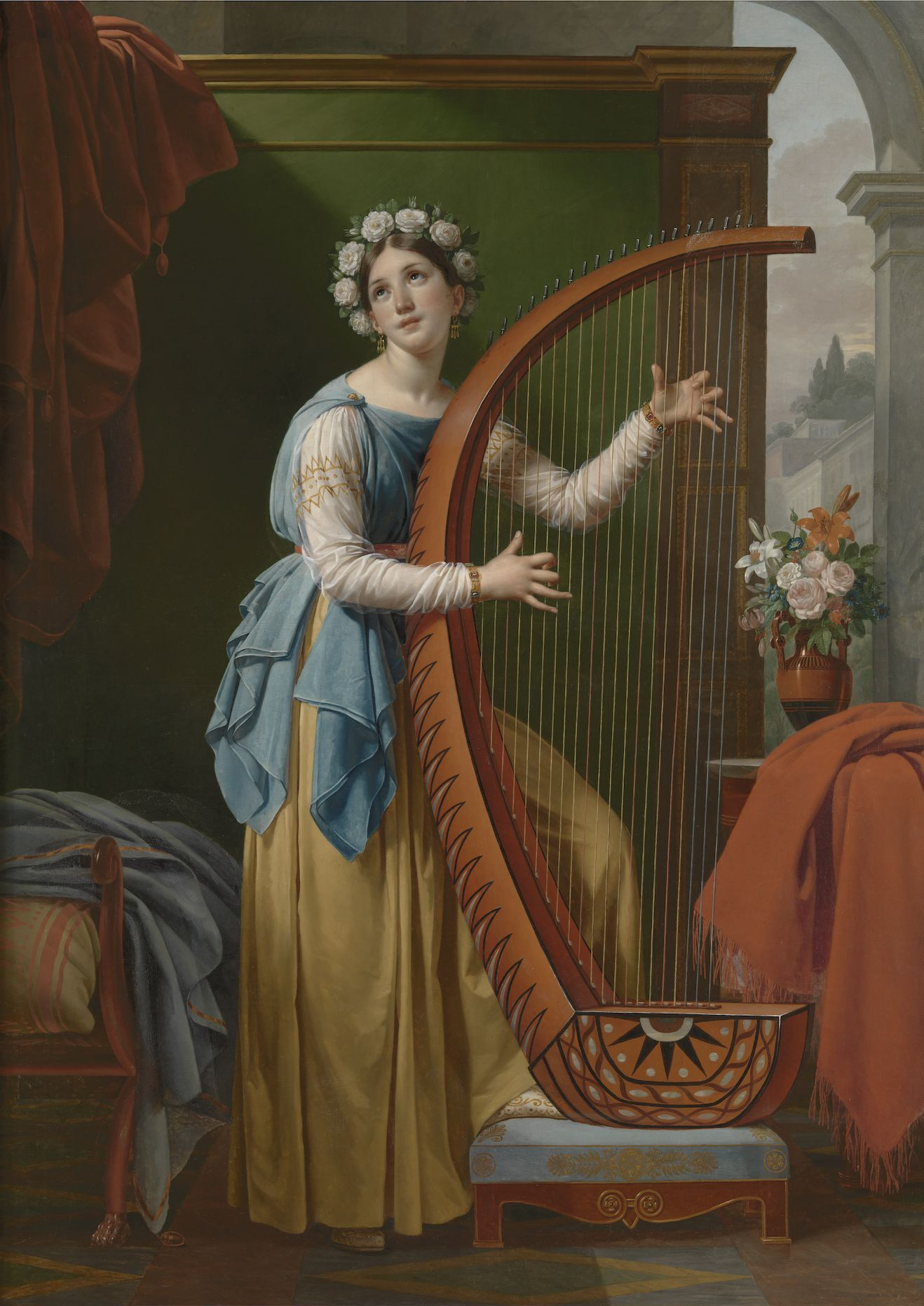
Saint Cecilia (1829) by Fanny Paelinck-Horgnies at the Museum of Fine Arts in Ghent
Domenichino's Fresco Cycle in San Luigi dei Francesi, Rome (1614)

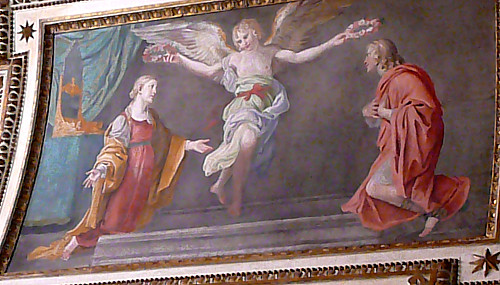
The Crowns

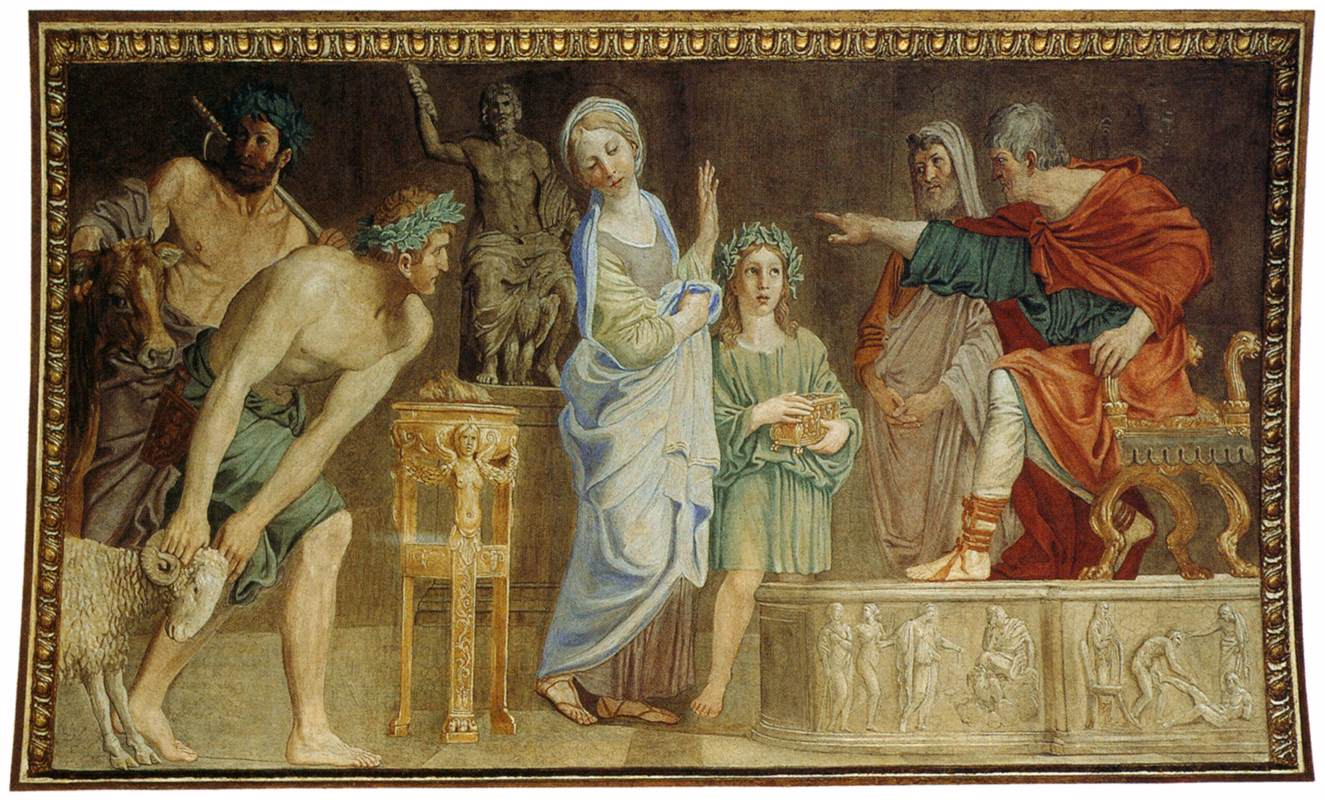
Cecilia's Trial

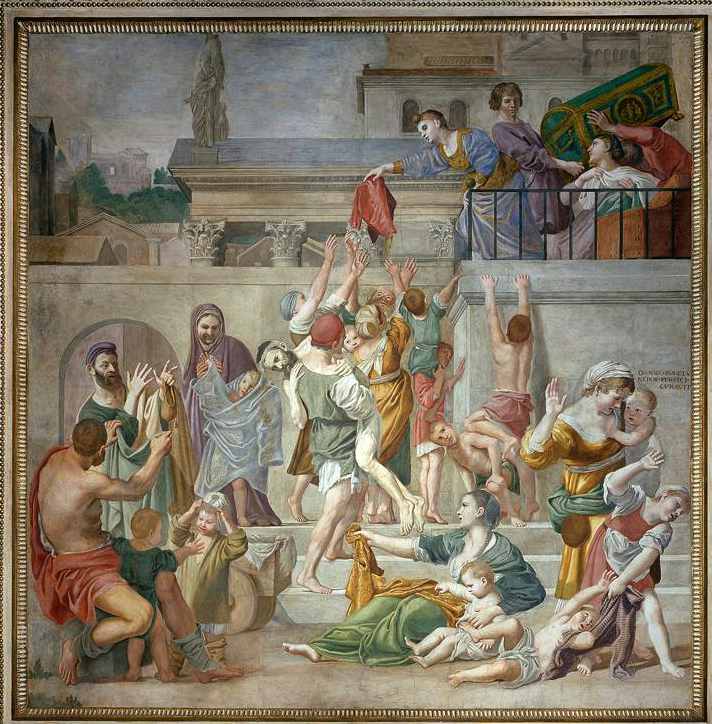
She distributes her goods to the poor

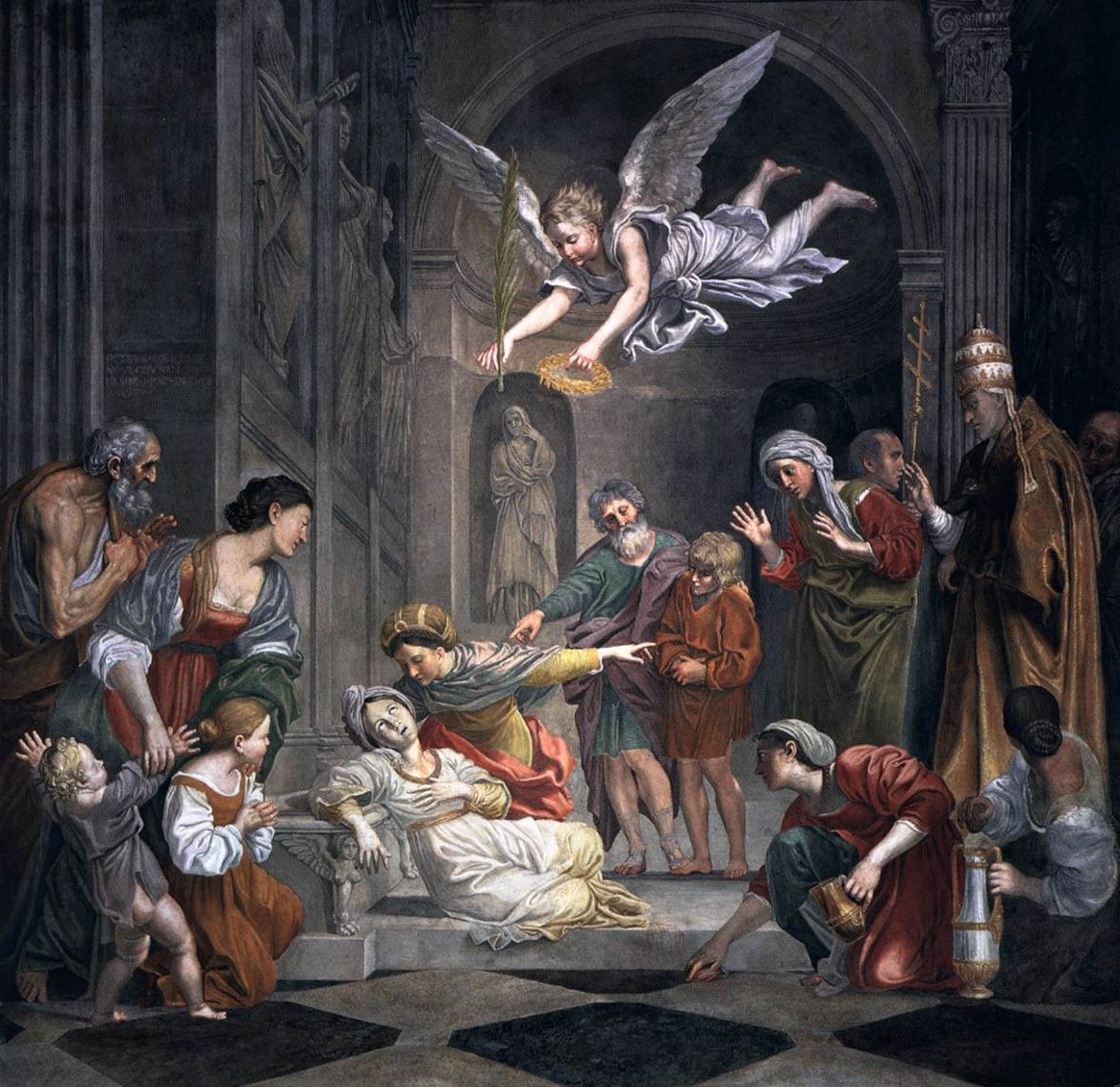
Her death
The apse mosaic in the Church of St. Cecilia in Trastevere

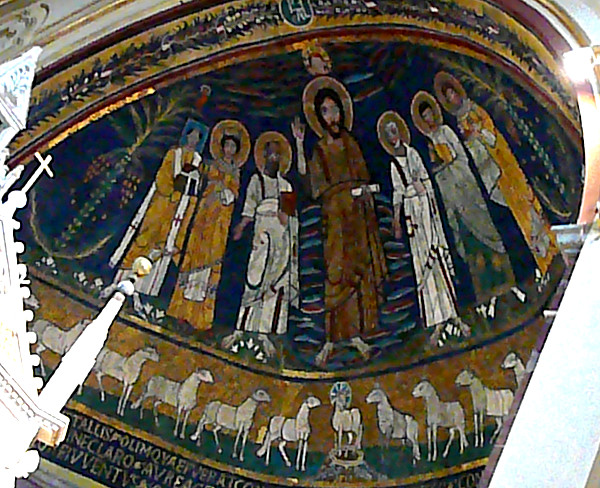
The apse

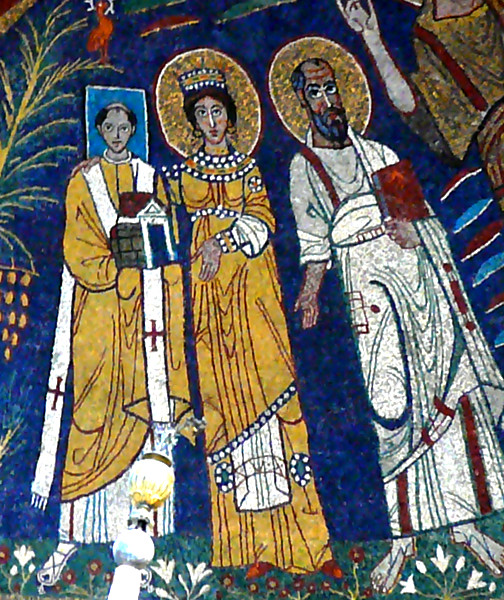
Detail: left side

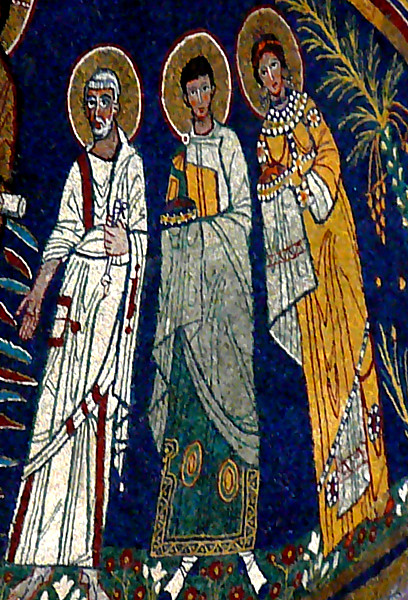
Detail: right side

== See also ==
- Albi Cathedral, Albi, France
- List of Christian women of the patristic age
- St. Cecilia Cathedral, Omaha, Nebraska, United States
- St. Cäcilien, Cologne, Germany
- St. Cecilia Catholic School, Houston, Texas, United States
- Saint Cecilia's Catholic Church (Brooklyn)
- St. Cecilia Catholic Church (Los Angeles)
- Saint Cecilia, patron saint archive
- Santa Cecilia Chapel, Għajnsielem, Gozo, Malta
- Santa Cecilia Tower, Għajnsielem, Gozo, Malta
- The Ecstasy of Saint Cecilia by Raphael, Pinacoteca Nazionale di Bologna, Bologna, Italy
- Basilique-Cathédrale Sainte-Cécile, Salaberry-de-Valleyfield, Quebec, Canada
- Church of Saint Cecilia in Cos
