= The Second Nun's Tale =

Part of the Canterbury Tales

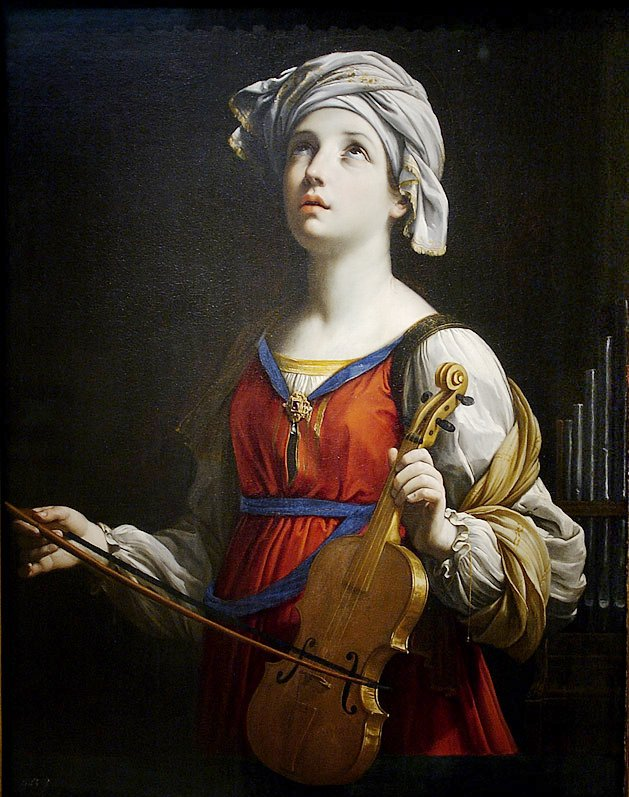
St. Cecilia, the focus of the Second Nun's Tale

"The Second Nun's Tale" (Middle English: Þe Seconde Nonnes Tale), written in late Middle English, is part of Geoffrey Chaucer's The Canterbury Tales. Narrated by a nun who remains unnamed, it is a hagiography of the life of Saint Cecilia.

The lack of portrait description for the second nun in the General Prologue of The Canterbury Tales has led some scholars to speculate that the tale is merely the second tale of the single nun or of the prioress but this idea is not widely held. Its relationship to the subsequent "The Canon's Yeoman's Tale" is to offer a serious and worthy religious-themed story before a much more irreverent tale of contemporary religious behaviour about foolish alchemists.

== Placement in The Canterbury Tales ==
Although it is unconfirmed what order Geoffrey Chaucer intended The Canterbury Tales, and therefore where "The Second Nun's Tale" would be placed, the main scholarly consensus has placed "The Second Nun's Tale" in Fragment VIII (Group G) out of X of the Canterbury Tales.

In all of the extant manuscripts, The Second Nun's Tale always occurs with The Canon's Yeoman's Tale, further indicating that the two tales are to be regarded as a pair.

The Second Nun's Tales may have been written for another occasion and only later inserted into The Canterbury Tales. In line VIII.62 of the Second Nun's Prologue, the Second Nun refers to herself as an "unworthy sone of Eve", indicating that the tale previously had a male narrator. In addition, the attribution of the tale to the Second Nun occurs only in the rubrics of the manuscripts, not in the Prologue or the Tale itself.

== Notable characters ==
- Cecilia – Saint, wife of Valerian
- Valerian – Husband of Cecilia
- Tiberuce – Brother of Valerian
- Almachius – The prefect of the district
- Pope Urban

== Prologue ==
The Prologue of The Second Nun's Tale contains three sections: 1. four stanzas on the hazards of idleness, 2. the Invocation to Mary (nine stanzas), and 3. the "Interpretation of the name Cecilia which Brother Jacob of Genoa put in his legend". This final section comprises a series of invented etymologies about that name Cecilia. "It is a good example of a medieval method of interpretation that adds rather than discovers meaning; it aims not for one but for a variety of interpretations, all of which are right and none which excludes the others, so that the object of interpretation, here the name Cecilia, gains in richness of meaning and range of reference."

=== Invocation to Mary ===
The Invocation to Mary (Invocacio ad Mariam) is a nine paragraph portion of the prologue, telling of the origin of the name of Cecilia. The Invocation has been argued to draw from many other sources in terms of its composure,: first of all Dante, but also many medieval liturgical hymns.

== Synopsis ==
A Roman maiden, Cecilia, is to be wedded to a man Valerian. Cecilia asks Valerian to swear not to betray her if she tells her secret, that she has an angel that watches over her, Christianity being a crime at the time. The angel will slay anyone who touches her. Valerian must be baptized and purged of sin before he can see the angel, so Cecilia sends him on a journey to Saint Urban, who is in hiding. Valerian finds Saint Urban and is converted. When he sees Cecilia's guardian angel, he is granted a wish: that his brother Tiburce be given the same gift of conversion. This is accomplished, again through Saint Urban.

The prefect Almachius orders them to be seized, but Maximus, the officer sent for them, is converted by Cecilia. Both Tiburce and Valerian nonetheless submit to the execution as an act of martyrdom to their new faith, and as their heads fall their spirits rise up to heaven, a miracle which Maximus uses to convert many others. Eventually, Almachius orders his men to capture Cecilia, and when she is brought before him she refuses to worship the Roman gods; Almachius commands her to worship the gods and boasts of his power; Cecilia shows him the foolishness of his arguments. She is condemned to be burned in a "bath of flames"; she survives a night and a day. A tormentor attempts to behead her, striking three times. She survives for three days, preaching the faith. Finally she dies; her house becomes the church of St. Cecilia in Rome, where it survives "[u]nto this day" (l. 552).

== Plot ==
The Second Nun's Tale explains the story of a young noble lady named Cecilia, and how her unwavering faith in God transformed her into Saint Cecilia.

A young maiden named Cecilia, from "her cradle onward," was highly devoted to her faith in Christ, and her love for Virgin Mary, so she asked God to protect her virginity. Even when she was betrothed to a man named Valerian, on her wedding day she begged God again to protect her virginity and sang to him, "O Lord, keep my soul and my body unspotted, lest I be confounded." On her wedding night, Cecilia asked Valerian to understand her decision to not consummate the marriage, and informed him that her body is protected by an angel of God, and if he was to touch or love her "ignobly," the angel would "without delay...slay you on the spot". However, if he protects Cecilia "in clean love", the angel would also love him and appreciate him for his purity. When Valerian asked to see the angel, Cecilia told him that he must "go forth to the Appian Way," and get baptised by Saint Urban.

After his baptism, during which he saw God who appeared as an old man in pure white garments, Valerian returned home and saw the angel. The angel gifted him and Cecilia with two crowns of lilies and roses, and asked that they guard the crowns with "a pure body and unspotted thought." The lilies and roses from the crown were fetched by the angel from "Paradise". Valerian then asked his brother, Tiburce, to come and accept God and know the truth, so he could also be protected by the angel. The angel then agreed and called his brother to come.

Upon his arrival, Valerian convinced Tiburce to get baptised by Pope Urban, and renounce his faith in idols. Cecilia referred to them as, "nothing but vain things, for they are dumb and deaf…" Tiburce went with his brother to Pope Urban, and got christened, which allowed him also to see the angel of God.

Eventually, Almachius the prefect heard of this and ordered his officers to take these saints to the idol of Jupiter, and to behead anyone who does not make a sacrifice. On his way, Maximus, one of his officers, started crying and per the saints' instructions, he took the executioners to his house and from their preaching, "...they rooted out the false faith from the executioners," and made them believers of God. Cecilia baptised them all together, and told Valerian and Tiburce that they had served well, and preserved their faith, and in order to save their lives, they should do the sacrifice. However, Valerian and Tiburce did not care for this, and in their unwavering devotion, fell to their knees, ready to lose their heads. When Maximus saw this, he told many others, in turn converting many of them, and also losing his life to his oppressor, Almachius.

After Cecilia buried the three of them, Almachius sent for some of his men to seize her and have her taken to Jupiter to make a sacrifice, who were also converted by her preaching. After hearing this, Almachius ordered her to be brought before him, and in a trial, questioned her about her faith. Cecilia told him that she did not fear his power, and that she would neither make a sacrifice nor renounce her faith in Christianity. Cecilia greeted a man with such power as a "foolish creature". She stated that Almachius "in all things an ignorant officer and a vain judge". Enraged by her boldness and steadfast faith, Almachius commanded his men to bring her to the bathhouse and "burn her right in a bath of red flames."

She laid in the bath for the day and night however her body, representative of her unwavering faith, remained unharmed that "she sat cold and felt no pain; it did not make her sweat even a drop". So Almachius sent for one of his men to slay her and kill her. The executioner struck her thrice in her neck, and no more because it was against the law, yet she still did not die. Cecilia stayed like that, half-dead, with her neck cut open for three days, preaching and converting those who gathered around her. She finally died after the third day, and after she died, Pope Urban buried her body with the other saints and decreed her as Saint Cecilia.

== Saint Cecilia's body analysed ==
Throughout the story, the importance of chastity is first to Saint Cecilia.

Daily, Cecilia prayed that God would "protect her virginity". She then tells her husband, Valerian, that if he were to "touch or love [her] ignobly, without delay [the angel] will slay you on the spot; and thus [he] would die in [his] youth". He hears this and he respects her wishes. Almachius, a Roman prefect, does not.

After learning that she is practising Christianity and of her boldness, he orders her to be burnt. Although she sat in a bath of flames, she sat there untouched by any of them. She sat cold and did not sweat one drop. After realising his failure, he then used his "evil mind" to devise that she be beheaded. She was then sent to be executed by three strokes to the neck. After three strokes, her head was still attached and the executioner could not hit her again. Even with this occurrence, Saint Cecilia still tells the Gospel to anyone that will hear her.

Despite the physical torture that Cecilia's body endures through the beating, burning, and slashing of her throat, she still remains alive for three days, and is able to convert many non-believers through her preachings. Her body supports her, and does not fail her when she needs it the most. Cecilia's body is a symbol for her unwavering faith, and devotion. It refuses to give in to the pain inflicted by her oppressor, Almachius, just like how Cecilia refuses to give in to his psychological tortures.

Cecilia's body's ability to maintain its chastity can also be seen as noteworthy. Despite having been forced into marriage to Valerian, and being punished for her chastity by Almachius, she was still able to preserve her chastity until she died. During this time, the female body was seen as one of the major sources where evil was birthed from. In "Body Symbolism in the Book of Margery Kempe", Susan Morgan states that, "medieval theologians and hagiographers viewed female sin as intrinsically bodily and sexual, emanating from within." By keeping her virginity intact, Cecilia's body was able to evade this "sin" which ultimately helped her maintain her devotion, and led to her being a saint.

According to "Body and Soul Dialogues in the Seventeenth Century", "the body may commit sinful actions, but the guilt is really the soul's". In the case of Cecilia, she controlled her body through her soul. She did not let the ways of the world affect her soul, therefore her body remained unharmed. "Body and Soul" goes on to state that the soul was "created good and noble". The "world and the devil" impacted the flesh, yet the soul can take control and urge the body not to sin. This is what Saint Cecilia does through her faith. "Body without soul does nothing" meaning that her soul and faith are so strong, her body must and will follow her willingly.

Cecilia's ability to maintain control over her body can be explained by her tendency to fast. Cecilia prayed to God to protect her virginity, and "for the love of Him who died upon a tree she fasted every second or third day." By many, fasting was seen as a way to maintain control over one's body. Susan Morgan states that, "[t]he link between eating and sexual domination has a long history in Christian tradition" and "[w]hen women…fasted…they were…punishing and disciplining their flesh in pursuit of the higher goal of asexuality or chastity." Similarly, Cecilia's decision to fast helped her control her body and remain chaste and pure. Additionally, Morgan states that, "food asceticism" helps one "journey into the body, conjoining the humanity of Christ…" Therefore, fasting not only helps Cecilia exhibit control over her body, but it also helped her feel closer to God and his power. As a woman, she holds exponential power when it comes to her religion. According to "Woman and the Church", "all through the history of the church women have played a great part". It goes on to say "Our Lady in the beginning had, and still holds, a most exalted position".

Remaining chaste and being in control of their own bodies, can also help women feel powerful. Cathy Hampton states that, '[a]ll virtuous women must accede directly to the call to chastity, an imperative that places them on equal footing rather than in a relationship of hierarchy." Relating to Cecilia, her decision to keep her virginity intact throughout her life may have also helped her feel more powerful, and made her realise that she had the independence to control her life allowing her to battle the oppression of Almachius.

== "Corones two" ==
An angel gives two crowns both to Valerian and Cecilia in "The Second Nun's Tale", which is symbolic in its nature. The crowns are composed of roses and lilies, which are allegorical references to martyrdom and virginity. These crowns were given to Valerian and Cecilia after the angel told them to "always guard these crowns well, with pure body and unspotted thought". By referencing virginity through the flowers the angel fetched from "Paradise", the crowns are now a symbolic representation of their purity through God and from God.

== Importance of bodily sensation on divine comprehension ==
In the Second Nun's Tale, Geoffrey Chaucer's characters' senses of sight, smell, and touch allows them to perceive the divine nature of things and gain a deeper spiritual understanding, which helped some of them ultimately reach martyrdom.

Sight: When Valerian asks Cecilia to see the angel, she says, "That angel you shall see… so long you believe in Christ and are baptized." Tiburce, also, only sees the angel after he gets baptised by Saint Urban. Elizabeth Robertson states that, "Chaucer validates the body's ability to apprehend the meaning of Christianity through senses." Overcoming their limited sight and seeing the angel, parallels to them gaining a deeper understanding of Christianity and religion.

According to "Truth and Sight: Generalizing without Universalizing", "with the type of psychology that the awareness of deceit creates, the idea that what is seen is more truthful than what is reported in speech seems an obvious way in order to bypass human...deceit".

Smell: Tiburce was immediately able to smell the sweet odour of the crowns of lilies and roses, even if he could not see them. These crowns are symbolic of the divine and his brother's and Cecilia's faith in God, and they lure Tiburce to seek this divinity and become a believer. Robertson confirms this by saying, "the flowers create in Tiburce a desire to know more about the spiritual truth, a desire that leads him to affirm his belief in God."

Touch: Valerian is unable to touch Cecilia's body, because the angel of God will kill him, so long as he is still a non-believer. Later, Cecilia tells Almachius to go beyond the materialised idols, and touch what he cannot see. However, Almachius is unable to do so, thus preventing him from gaining deeper spiritual understanding and belief.
