= Hymn to St Cecilia =

Composition by Benjamin Britten

- Choral music by Benjamin Britten
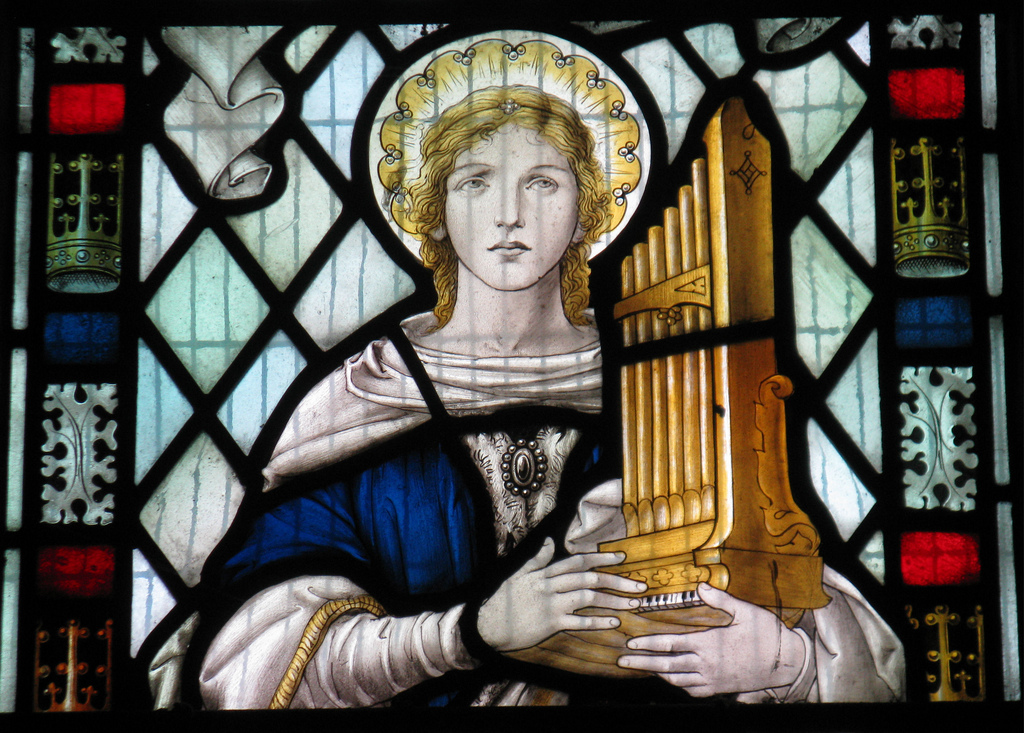
- St. Cecilia, the patron saint of music
- Opus: 27
- Text: poem by W. H. Auden
- Language: English
- Composed: 1942

Hymn to St Cecilia, Op. 27 is a choral piece by Benjamin Britten (1913–1976), a setting of a poem by W. H. Auden written between 1940 and 1942. Auden's original title was "Three Songs for St. Cecilia's Day", and he later published the poem as "Anthem for St. Cecilia’s Day (for Benjamin Britten)".

For a long time Britten wanted to write a piece dedicated to St Cecilia for a number of reasons. Firstly, he was born on St Cecilia's day; secondly, St Cecilia is the patron saint of music; and finally, there is a long tradition in England of writing odes and songs to St Cecilia. The most famous of these are by John Dryden ("A song for St. Cecilia's Day" 1687) and musical works by Henry Purcell, Hubert Parry, and George Frideric Handel. Another briefer work by Herbert Howells has the similar title A Hymn for St Cecilia, but was written later in 1960. The first extant reference to Britten's desire to write such a work is from 1935 when Britten wrote in his diary "I’m having great difficulty in finding Latin words for a proposed Hymn to St Cecilia. Spend morning hunting."

Britten first met Auden later that year, and subsequently worked with him on a number of large-scale works, including the operetta Paul Bunyan (1941). Britten asked that Auden provide him a text for his ode to St Cecilia, and Auden complied, sending the poem in sections throughout 1940, along with advice on how Britten could be a better artist. This was to be one of the last works they collaborated on. According to Britten's partner Peter Pears in 1980, "Ben was on a different track now, and he was no longer prepared to be dominated – bullied – by Wystan, whose musical feeling he was very well aware of. ...Perhaps he may have been said to have said goodbye to working with Wystan with his marvelous setting of the Hymn to St. Cecilia." Britten began setting Hymn to St. Cecilia in the United States, certainly in June 1941 when a performance by the newly formed Elizabethan Singers was projected to take place in New York sometime later that year. In 1942, the midst of World War II, Britten and Pears decided to return home to England. The customs inspectors confiscated all of Britten's manuscripts, fearing they could be some type of code. Britten re-wrote the manuscript while aboard the MS Axel Johnson, and finished it on 2 April 1942. It was written at the same time as A Ceremony of Carols, which shares the same affect.

The text itself follows in the tradition of odes, including an invocation to the muse: "Blessed Cecilia/Appear in visions to all musicians/Appear and inspire". Britten uses this as a refrain throughout piece, whereas it is the last portion of Auden's first section.

The piece is in three sections, plus three iterations of the refrain, with slight variations, following each section. The first section is very similar to the refrain, couched in the E Phrygian scale and with the same melody. The second section is a scherzo with a modified fugue form. The third section is more lyrical, with solos in each voice describing a different instrument, traditional in odes to St. Cecilia.

The hymn was given its first radio performance in 1942.
