= Philippe Goibaut =

French translator

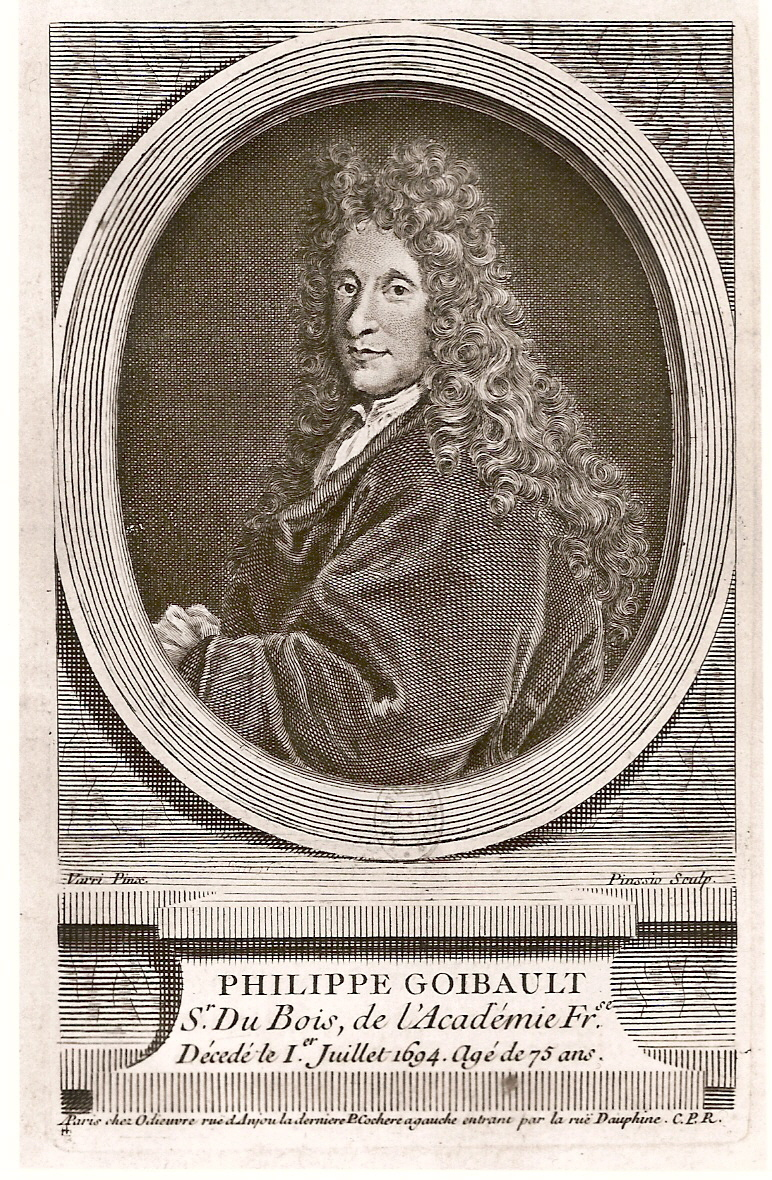
Philippe Goibaut ("Monsieur Du Bois") c. 1690

Philippe Goibaut des Bois La Grugère (pronounced [filip ɡwabo de bwɑ la ɡʁyʒɛʁ]; 22? March 1629 – 1 July 1694), known to his contemporaries as Monsieur Du Bois (pronounced [məsjø dy bwɑ]), was a translator of St. Augustine, member of the Académie Française and director of Mademoiselle de Guise's musical ensemble. Goibaut is the preferred spelling: that is how he signed his name.

One of his detractors claimed that Goibaut began his career as dancing master to the young Louis Joseph, Duke of Guise and did not learn Latin until he was thirty, when the Jansenist “Messieurs” of Port-Royal became his spiritual and intellectual mentors. In 1965 Jean Mesnard's research into the circle around Blaise Pascal proved the inaccuracy of this legend. Mesnard's findings have shaped the biography that follows.

== Biography ==
Philippe Goibaut was born into a solid bourgeois family of Poitou. His father, Philippe Goibaut, "écuyer" and "seigneur du Bois et de La Grugère" (d. 1638), was sénéchal of Champdeniers, a fief of the powerful Rochechouarts. Young Philippe studied in Poitiers and in 1655 asserted that he was a maître d’hôtel ordinaire du roi. An inventory of his possessions drawn up that year refers to a library of some 200 books in Greek, Latin and French, as well as a viol, a theorbo and a guitar. In other words, by the time he was twenty-five, Goibaut was already skilled in classical letters and was at least a competent performer on stringed instruments. In 1655 he married Françoise Blacvod (d. 1676), the daughter of an official of Poitiers who descended from Adam Blackwood, physician to Mary, Queen of Scots.

In 1660, Du Bois journeyed to Paris and rapidly entered the circle of Artus Gouffier, Duke of Roannez, the royal governor of Poitou. Roannez introduced him to his close friend Pascal, to Christiaan Huygens who was in Paris 1660-1661, and also to the “Pascalins,” a group of writers who claimed to be disciples of Pascal or who at least were obsessed with his example and inspired by him. After two sojourns in Paris, Goibaut, with his wife, moved there permanently in 1666. He began trying his hand at translation, consulting with Antoine Arnauld about Port-Royal's translation of the New Testament and gaining Arnauld's lasting respect for his translation skills. Goibaut would soon be described as a man of “limitless intellect who, they say, most closely approaches Monsieur Pascal and has imitated him best.” Although Goibaut initially defended his Jansenist friends of Port-Royal and, in 1670, participated in their edition of Pascal's Pensées, he gradually distanced himself from the movement.

In 1666 Mlle de Guise chose Goibaut to be the preceptor (other sources say the “governor”) of her sixteen-year-old nephew, Louis-Joseph de Lorraine|Louis Joseph, Duke of Guise. Indeed, Goibaut had earned respect for his theories about how best to educate princes. Upon his arrival at the “Hôtel de Guise”, Goibaut set about ghost-writing the memoirs of Mlle de Guise's late brother, Henry, Duke of Guise, who had died in 1664. The memoirs were published under Henry's name in 1668.

Mlle de Guise lodged her protégé in an apartment in the newly renovated stable wing of her splendid urban palace. There Goibaut regularly entertained one or another of the “pascalins.” One of his neighbors was Roger de Gaignières, who was amassing a collection of historical documents and images. A few years later, the princess also offered her protection to a young composer named Marc-Antoine Charpentier, to whom she granted an apartment adjacent to Goibaut's. After the Duke's death in 1672, both Mlle de Guise and the Duke's widow, “Mme de Guise” continued their protection of Goibaut and Charpentier. For seventeen years the two men — joined by an ever-increasing number of singers and instrumentalists — performed religious and secular music for the two Guise princesses, not only in their private residences and chapels but also at the royal court and in select Parisian venues. To be precise, Goibaut conducted and Charpentier composed. Goibaut may occasionally have played with the ensemble, just as Charpentier sometimes sang with it. Indeed, when Goibaut died, he still owned his viol, plus fifty-six volumes of music by a variety of composers. For some of these volumes he had badgered the resident in Paris for Cosimo III de' Medici, Grand Duke of Tuscany, to ship Italian songbooks to Paris for the enjoyment of Mlle de Guise. A neo-Latinist who probably wrote most, if not all the libretti for Charpentier's oratorios, Goibaut was respected for his ability to set Latin texts to plainsong.

After the death of the Duke of Guise in 1672, Goibaut began translating Latin texts into French: Thomas à Kempis's Imitation of Christ, two volumes of Cicero and eight volumes of St. Augustine. For his point of departure he used the recent Latin editions done by the scholarly Benedictines of Saint-Maur. Always keeping the lay reader in mind, he worked to present not only the author's ideas but also his tone and his manner of expressing himself. To this end, Goibaut did not translate word for word; instead, he conveyed "what the author wanted to impress upon the reader's spirit and heart." The translated text was complemented by brief annotations providing background information about the history of the late Roman Empire or the theological quarrels of the first centuries of the Church. The result, said Pierre Bayle, is "exact, faithful, pure, elegant, and admirably disentangled." The first of these translations came off the press 1678; the last appeared posthumously in 1696. In addition, the Revocation of the Edict of Nantes in October 1685 caused Goibaut to write his Conformité de la conduite de l’église en France, which parallels the Church's repressive conversion of the Donatists and its forcible conversion of Protestants after the Revocation. Goibaut calls for using, instead, "the force of Truth," that is, the gentler approach recommended in two of St. Augustine's letters.

During Mlle de Guise's last illness, Goibaut and Father François de la Chaise, S.J. may well have exerted undue influence on the dying woman. At any rate, both men received large legacies. Upon the princess's death in March 1688, Goibaut was granted the right to remain at the Hôtel de Guise. During those years, he frequently saw Mme de Sévigné, who admired his wit and his intellect and considered him to be sincerely devout. But he had his detractors, who tended to view him as a shameless opportunist who had a knack for ingratiating himself.

In November 1693, Philippe Goibaut was elected to the Académie Française. Eight months later he died in his apartment at the Hôtel de Guise and was buried at the nearby parish church of Saint-Jean-en-Grève, since destroyed. He had not lived long enough to collect his legacy from Mlle de Guise.

== Writings ==
- Mémoires de Feu Monsieur de Duc de Guise (Paris, 1668).
- Discours sur les Pensées de Pascal, où l’on essaye de faire voir quel estoit son dessein, et un autre Discours sur les preuves des livres de Moyse, by Du Bois de La Cour, that is, Filleau de La Chaise (Paris: Desprez, 1672), attributed to Goibaut.
- Translation of St. Augustine, Les Deux Livres ... de la Prédestination des saints et du Don de la persévérance (Paris, 1676).
- Translation of St. Augustine, Les Livres ... de la Manière d’enseigner les principes de la religion chrestienne ... de la Vertu de continence et de tempérance, de la Patience et Contre le mensonge (Paris, 1678).
- Translation of St. Augustine, Lettres (Paris, 1684), dedicated to Mlle de Guise and ornamented with an engraved version of her portrait by Mignard.
- Conformité de la conduite de l’église de France, pour ramener les protestants, avec celle de l’église d’Afrique, pour ramener les donatistes à l’église catholique (Paris, 1685), Goibaut's comments on two letters by St. Augustine, followed by the letters themselves.
- Translation of St. Augustine, Les Confessions ... (Paris, 1686).
- Translation of Thomas à Kempis, De l’Imitation de Jésus-Christ ... (Paris, 1687).
- Translation of St. Augustine, Les Deux Livres ... de la Véritable religion et des Mœurs de l’Église catholique ... (Paris, 1690).
- Translation of Cicero, Les Offices ... (Paris, 1691).
- Translation of Cicero, Les Livres ... de la Vieillesse et de l’Amitié, avec les Paradoxes ... (Paris, 1691).
- Translation of St. Augustine, Les Sermons ... sur le Nouveau Testament ... (Paris, 1694), dedicated to Mme de Guise. The “Avertissement” at the head of this translation has been edited by Thomas M. Carr, Jr., Réflexions ... (Geneva: Droz, 1992).
- “Discours prononcez dans l’Académie Française le jeudy 12 novembre 1693 à la réception de M. du Bois” (Paris, 1693).
- Translation of St. Augustine, Les Soliloques, les Méditations et le Manuel ... (Paris, 1696).
- Translation of St. Augustine, Le Manuel et le Livre ... de l’esprit et de la lettre (Paris, 1759).
