= Song of Horror =

- Cover art of the Complete Edition featuring the Presence
- Developer: Protocol Games
- Publisher: Raiser Games
- Director: Ignacio F. Herrero
- Designer: Ignacio F. Herrero
- Programmer: Carlos G.F. Grupeli
- Artist: Ignacio F. Herrero
- Writers: Ignacio F. Herrero; Carlos G.F. Grupeli
- Composers: Manuel López Ibáñez; Aram Shahbazians
- Engine: Unreal Engine 4
- Platforms: Windows; PlayStation 4; Xbox One
- Release: Windows: WW: October 31, 2019; PlayStation 4, Xbox One: WW: May 28, 2021
- Genre: Survival horror
- Mode: Single-player

Song of Horror is an episodic survival horror game developed by Protocol Games and published by Raiser Games. The story focuses on publisher Daniel Noyer who is sent by his editor to investigate the disappearance of acclaimed writer Sebastian P. Husher and his family. Arriving at their mansion, Daniel becomes embroiled in a plot involving a cursed music box controlled by a deadly entity known as the Presence, which kills anyone who listens to its music. Daniel, with the help of some friends and individuals connected to the Hushers, sets out to uncover the mystery surrounding the Presence and its music box, as well as save himself from its grasp.

The game received mixed-to-positive reviews from critics. Praise was aimed at the level design and graphics of the locations, as well as the sound design, camera angles, atmosphere, and inclusion of the permadeath feature. Response to the story, characters, voice acting, as well as the Presence and its attacks; the developers acknowledged that Erica Färber was well-received by fans, which resulted in her return as a playable character in the final episode. The character models and puzzles were criticized.

== Development ==
Song of Horror was developed by Madrid-based Protocol Games.

== Reception ==
Reception

Aggregate scores
Aggregator	Score
Metacritic	PC: 74/100; PS4: 68/100; XONE: 79/100
OpenCritic	55%

According to review aggregator platform Metacritic, the Windows and PlayStation 4 versions of Song of Horror received "mixed or average" reviews, while the Xbox One version received "generally favorable" reviews. OpenCritic reported that 55% of 49 critics recommended the game.

The game's story received a mixed response from critics. Jeuxvideo.com's Jerome Joffard found the story underdeveloped, particularly due to the cutscenes' short length, which made it difficult to become invested in it; while he did praise the final episode tying the various subplots together, he still found the overall story incomplete. Will Aickman of Adventure Gamers believed the story did not merit the game's length, finding its span across five episodes as unnecessary. The central plot of a cursed music box was described as cliché by Marco Gonzálvez of IGN Spain and Edwin Evans-Thirlwell, writing for Eurogamer; the latter referring to it as a "run-of-the-mill Lovecraftian" plot. Conversely, Erica Mura of The Games Machine praised the story as disturbing, describing it as having a "fairly consistent narrative pace" that can simultaneously maintain the curiosity of players, while also scaring them. Riccardo Cantù, writing for Eurogamer's Italian branch, described the story as well-written and the game's greatest strength, arguing that the "twists and turns [...] will keep [players] hooked until its splendid conclusion".

While the characters were viewed as underdeveloped, praise was aimed at each one having unique reactions to their envirvonments and objects they discover. Aickman viewed the characters as underdeveloped and criticized them for lacking meaningful relationships with each other, arguing this made it difficult to care for them. Moreover, he lamented that with the game's permadeath feature, a character's death has no impact on the story's trajectory. Joffard similarly found the characters underdeveloped, recognizing that while each one offered different opinions concerning their surroundings or puzzles, there was not enough to differentiate them from each other, and found Daniel to be "uncharismatic". Gonzálvez, while acknowledging that the characters do not have much depth, praised them for being unique and having individualized reactions to their environments. He believed this increased the game's replay value, especially to see how each character behaves differently in each episode. Evans-Thirlwell and HobbyConsolas' Daniel Quesada also praised the characters having different responses to objects and their surroundings, with Game Informer writer Jeff Cork arguing that it helped humanize and differentiate them from one another.

While game journalists had a mixed response to the voice acting, the character models were heavily criticized. Cantù viewed the acting in Song of Horror as good, as did Aickman praised the vocal performances, who highlighted that of Ernest Finnegan's actor, stating his performance is part of what makes episode four the most effective one. By contrast, Evans-Thirlwell found the voice acting as akin to that of a B movie, with Cork criticizing both the vocal performances and character animations. The character models also received criticism from Cantù, Joffard, and Quesada, who viewed them as outdated, particularly the facial animations.

The level design and graphics for the locations received praise. (Note: As indicated by reviews here:) Cantù viewed the level design as very detailed and as managing to provide an appropriately frightening atmosphere, while Mura argued each episode improved upon the previous one regarding the level design. Both Aickman and Joffard, in lauding the game's graphics and environment, singled out Saint Cecilia's Abbey from episode 4, highlighting the locale's backstory involving the Presence and monks. Evans-Thirlwell praised the maps and level designs of the first two episodes, likening the Husher household to the Spencer Mansion from Resident Evil (1996). However, he was critical of episode 3's map being composed of three separate segments. Joffard similarly criticized episode 3 being separated into acts taking place at different locations, arguing that it made the episode less frightening; he also found the levels to be disconnected. Critics also gave praise to the sound design and camera angles, which many argued helped build an appropriate and frightening atmosphere. (Note: As indicated by various sources here:)

The inclusion of a permadeath feature gained mostly positive comments. Quesadam and Gonzálvez praised the permadeath feature for increasing the tension for players. Cantù also arguing that, aside from building tension, permadeath forces players to consider their next move as to avoid killing their characters, with Cork stating this helped in "making [him] paranoid" about his decisions. On the other hand, while Joffard believed permadeath helped make players feel powerless against the Presence, it was frustrating to restart an episode due to all the characters dying. Aickman echoed similar remarks, while also finding the game's handling of permadeath as faulty. He argues that an effective approach is to ensure that the experience of restarting will be different than the one before a character died; as Song of Horror focuses on puzzle-solving and advancing a linear plot, this does not occur.

The Presence and its artificial intelligence garned a mixed response from critic, while its attack involving quick time events were criticized. Cantù praised the Presence's AI, as did Quesada, who specifically commended how the Presence adjusts its behaviour based on the players' behaviour. By contrast, Aickman did not view the AI of the Presence as sufficiently advanced and viewed the minigames involving its attacks as lacking in scares, as the focus was primarily on button mashing. Evans-Thirlwell further described the Presence as the game's weakest component and the QTE minigames as "divisive". Gonzálvez believed that certain of the minigames were too difficult, as they took place in areas that players would not have had the chance to explore and figure out appropriate hiding places. Contrariwise, Cork complimented the Presence and its forms of attacks; particularly the "Silence" minigame.

Response to the puzzles was mostly negative, being viewed as difficult or illogical. Cork praised the game's puzzles, and how they often gave an incentive to search through all files for clues. Mura praised the ones present in the earlier episodes as appropriately challenging but felt that as the game progressed, the puzzles became unnecessarily difficult. Gonzálvez also acknowledged that certain puzzles were too difficult. Aickman, Joffard, and Quesada criticized the puzzles as confusing, illogical, and difficult, with the game not offering enough clues on how to solve them.
