= Chinese porcelain in European painting =

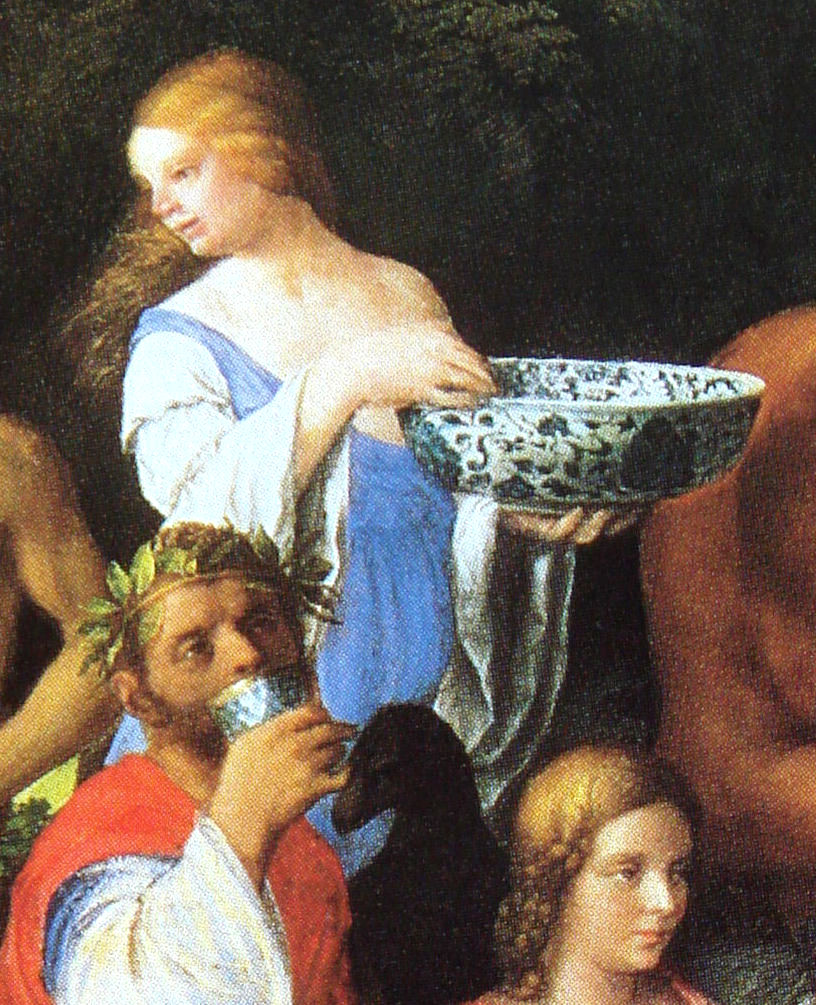
The Feast of the Gods (detail), Giovanni Bellini, 1514

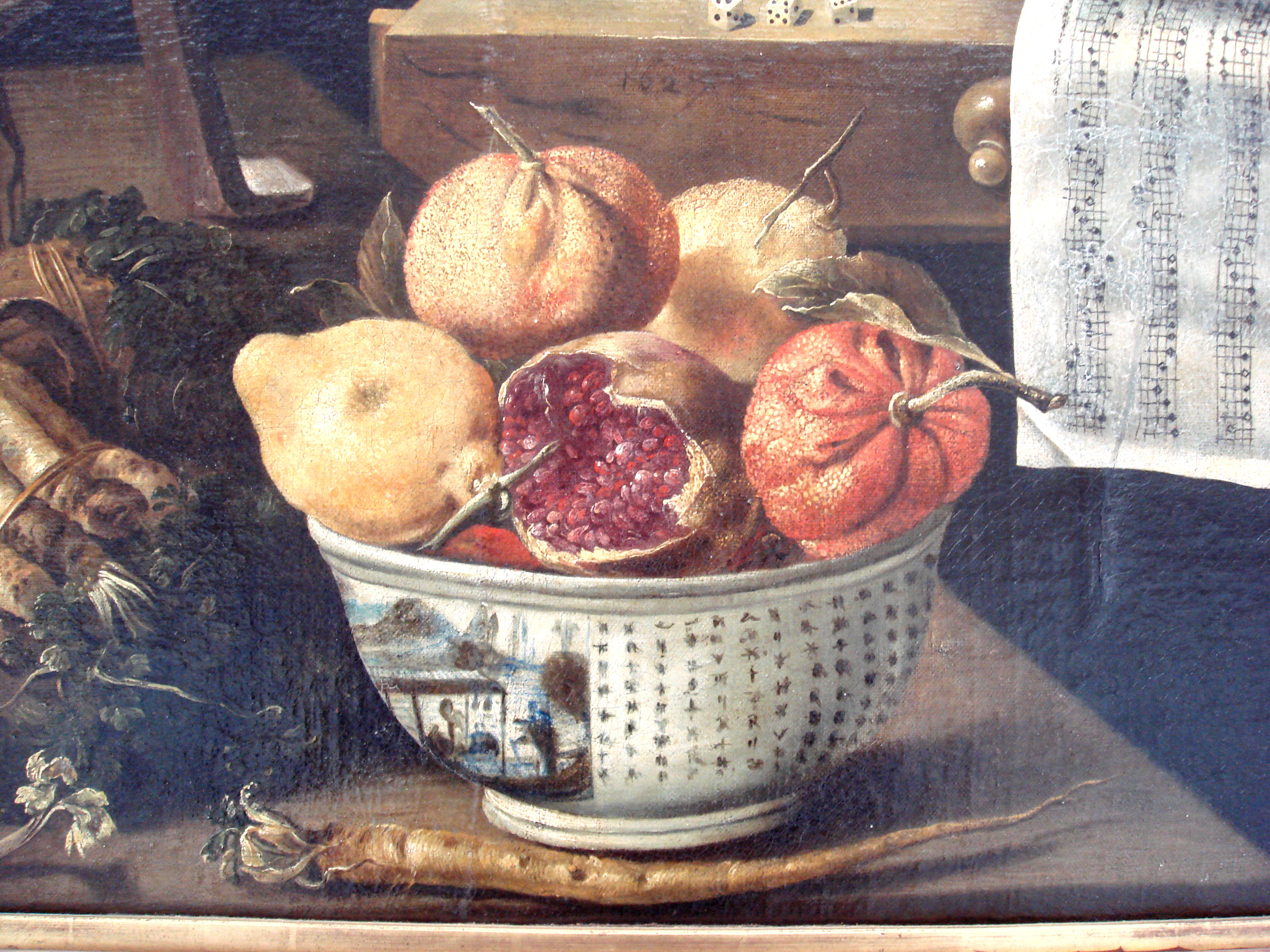
Jacques Linard, Les cinq sens et les quatre éléments, with Chinese blue and white porcelain bowl covered with Chinese writing, 1627

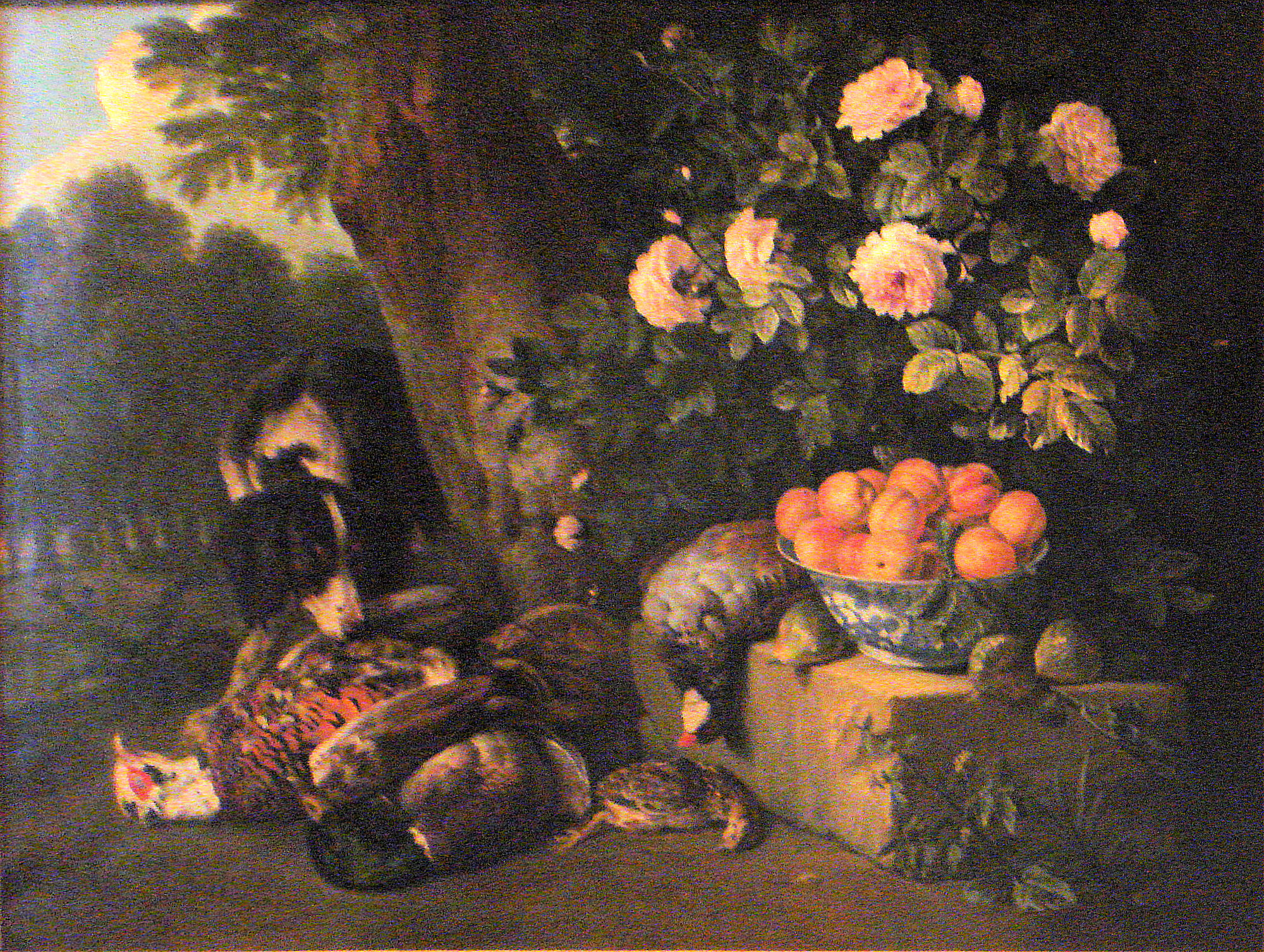
Nature morte au gibier et a la coupe de porcelaine, François Desportes, c. 1700–1710

Chinese porcelain in European painting is known from the 16th century, following the importation of Chinese porcelain wares into Europe.

== Italian precedents (15th–16th century) ==
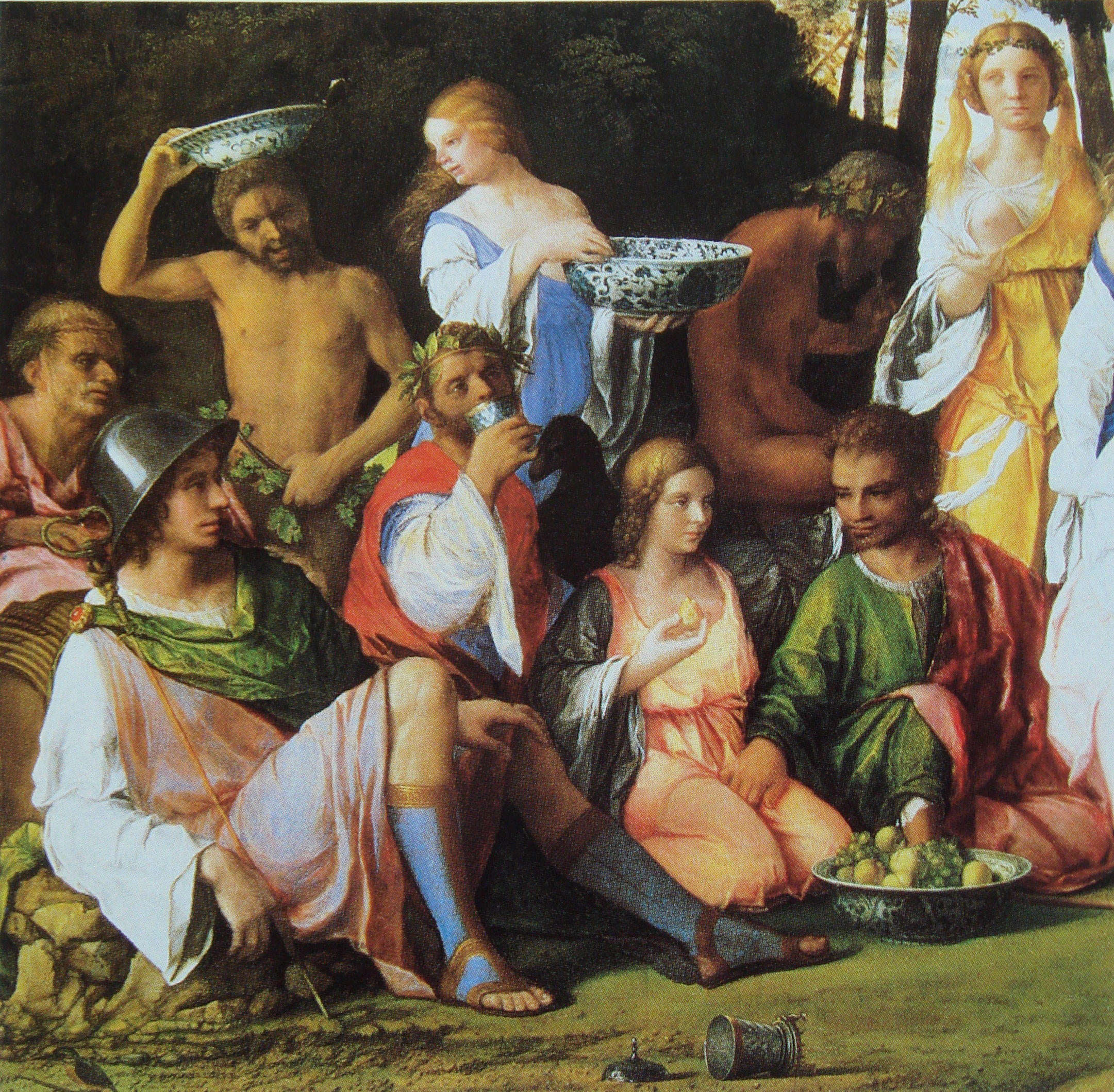
Chinese Ming-type bowls in Giovanni Bellini's The Feast of the Gods' (1514)

In Italy, the first known depiction of Chinese porcelain bowls is from The Feast of the Gods by Giovanni Bellini (1514). The style of the bowls is that of the Ming dynasty blue and white porcelain type, maybe examples of which are known to have been exported in Persia, Syria and Egypt. The painting by Bellini was a request by Duke Alfonso I d'Este, who was known for his interest in Chinese porcelain. It seems that Bellini found samples of the Chinese ware not through trade, but among diplomatic gifts received by Venice from the Mamluke Sultans in 1498 (gift to Doge Barbarigo), and in 1498 and 1508 (gift to the Signoria).

Some earlier examples are known though, although it is unclear if they are Chinese or Islamic prototypes, as in the Madonna and Child by Francesco Benaglio (1460–70), or the Adoration of the Magi by Andrea Mantegna (1495–1505).

== Rest of Europe (17th–18th century) ==
In the 16th century, numerous other painters would use Chinese porcelain in their paintings, especially Dutch ones. This trend was related to the direct importation of Chinese porcelain to Europe, through what is known as "Carrak" trade, hence the name Kraak porcelain.

French painters, such as François Desportes and Paul Gauguin, also represented Chinese bowls in their still-life paintings. Some like Jacques Linard in 1627 even painstakingly reproduced Chinese writing, in Les cinq sens et les quatre éléments, 1627.

This artistic trend coinciding with the fashion for Chinese porcelain in Europe in the 17th–18th century, which led to the development of a local porcelain industry initially highly imitative of Chinese wares, as seen in French porcelain.

=== The Netherlands ===
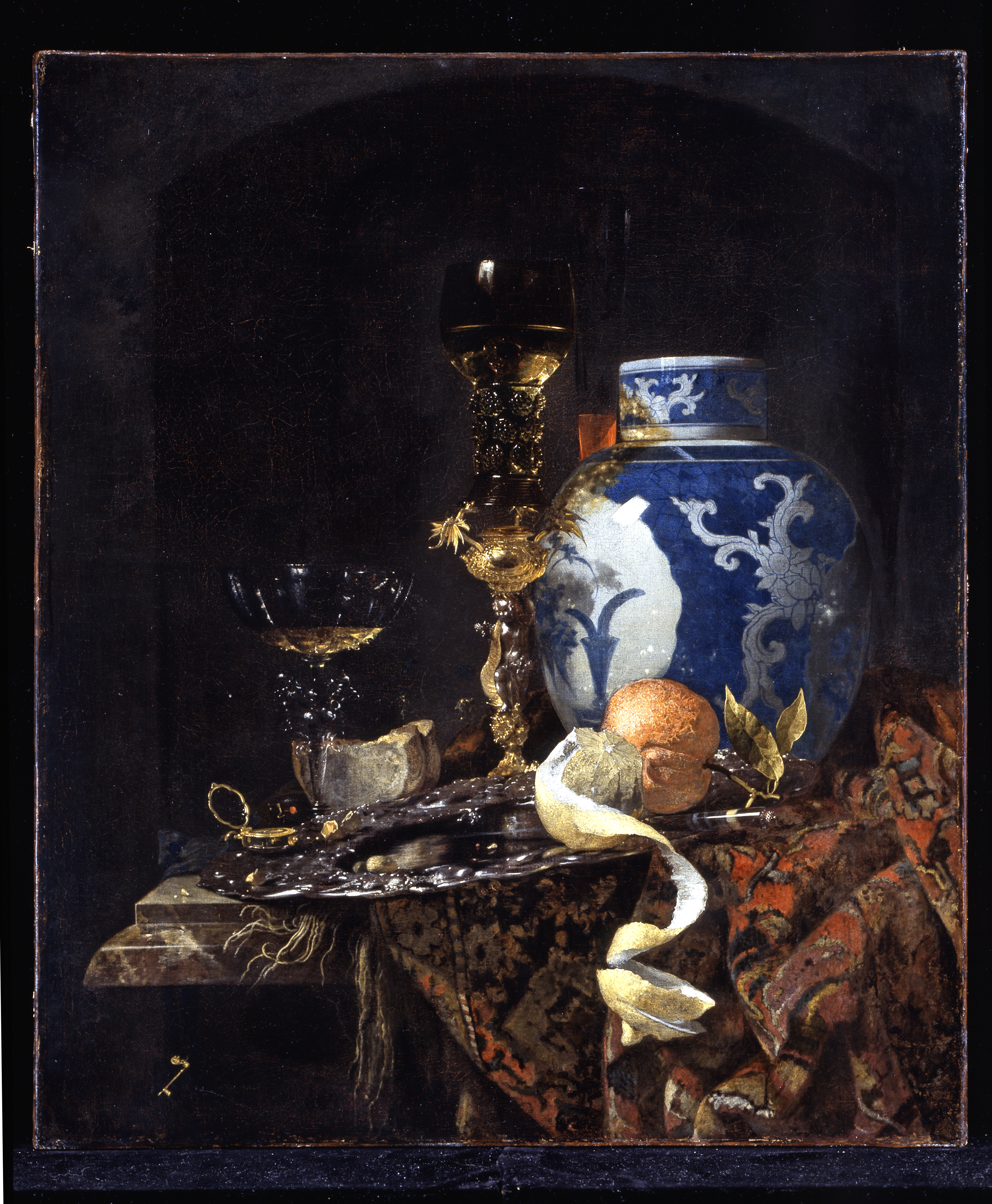
Willem Kalf - Still-Life with a Late Ming Ginger Jar - WGA12080

In the history of seventeenth-century trade, few things can compete with the prominent position of porcelain. Before the discovery of its making technique in the West, commercial activity between Europe and China was the only way to possess them. During the seventeenth century, the Dutch Republic came to the fore in the realm of porcelain trading. This history was tightly related to the history of the Dutch East India Company. As a monopoly in the early-modern Europe-Asia trade, the Dutch East India Company acts as a mediator between the two cultures and imports tons of porcelain along with other commodities like spices, silk, and tea. Since then, Chinese ceramic was not the exclusive luxury that only appeared in the upper class's mansion but became increasingly common in the domestic setting of the relatively humble household.

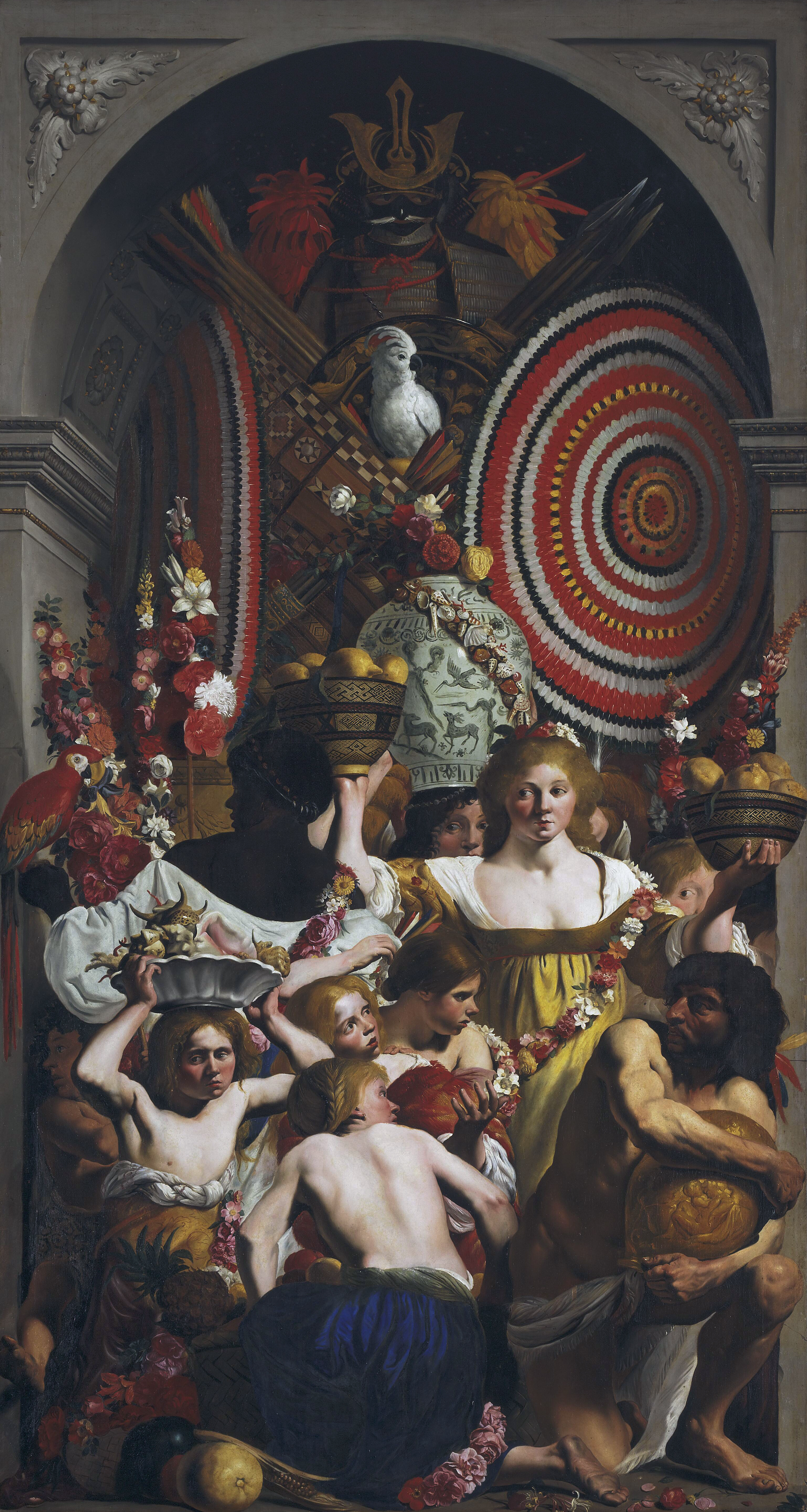
Part of the Triumphal Procession, with Gifts from the East and the West, by Jacob van Campen

Although the imported Chinese ceramics gains its popularity among wealthy merchants, the erudite scholars and philosophers are not satisfied merely with the commercial value of the porcelain. For them, the country and the civilization that created this fascinating material culture are the core of the interest. The appeal of China is deeply rooted in a long western tradition that may begin with the renowned Italian explorer Marco Polo. This impression of China was reinforced by the exotic Chinese goods and luxuries that appeared in Europe, such as spices, silk, tea, and porcelain. Motivated by the splendid material culture, intellectuals ceaselessly explore Chinese civilisation. This positive view of Chinese civilization also existed among the Dutch early-modern authors. For instance, scholars like Willem ten Rhijne, Peter van Hoorn, and Joost van den Vondel demonstrate strong interests in sinology and actively spread their thoughts through their books. This “Chinese fever” culminated with the first Dutch translation of Confucius in 1675. Intellectuals’ taste could influence artists to a large extent since they are also important patrons of art. Although whether the artists are able to understand the cultural connotations of Chinese porcelains is quite ambiguous, the wave of the chinoiserie may permeate into the artistic group. Chinese porcelain represents not only advanced craftsmanship and technology but also the symbol of civilization that is far away from Europe.

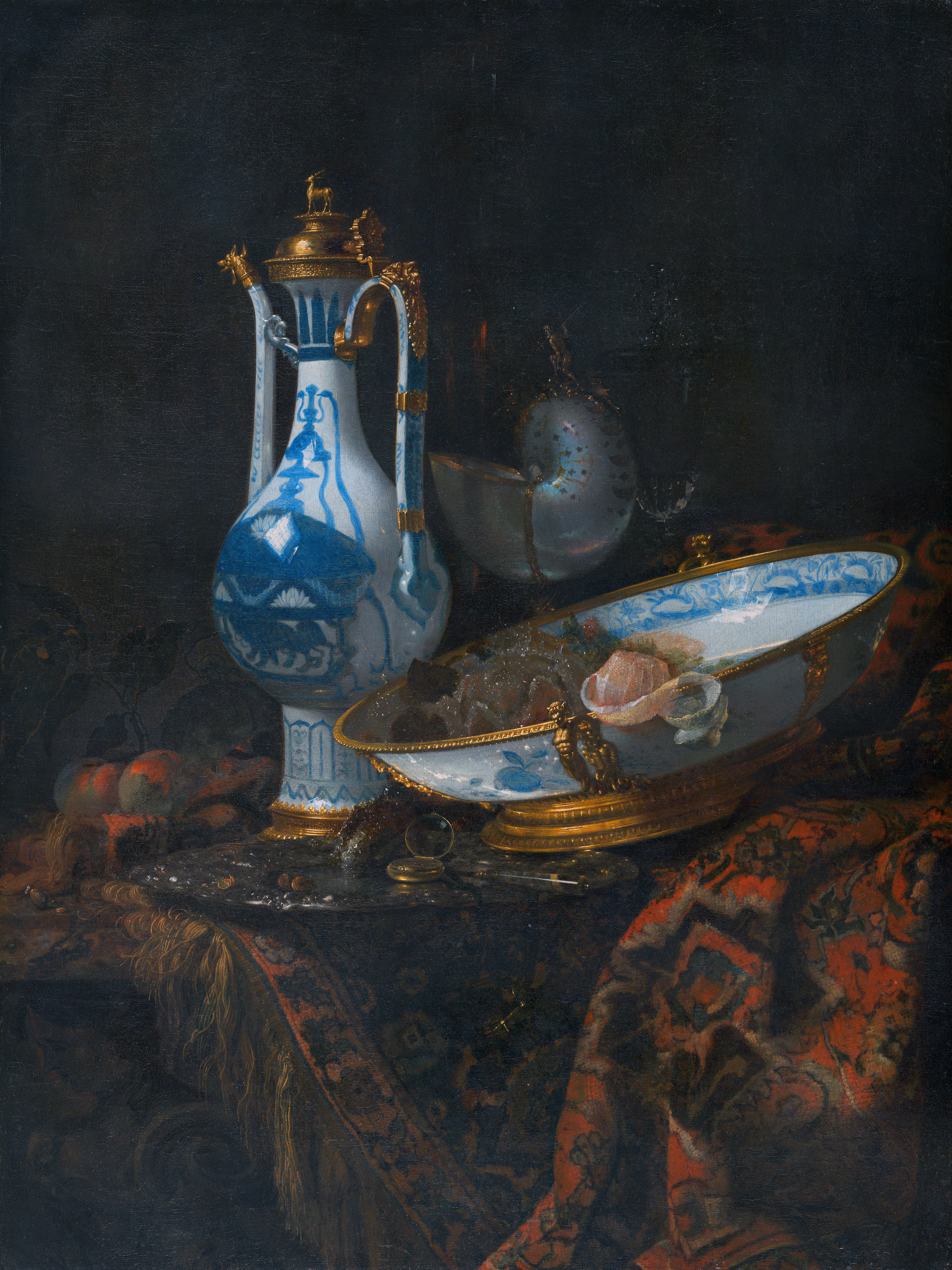
Kalf, Willem - Still-Life with an Aquamanile, Fruit, and a Nautilus Cup - c. 1660

Meanwhile, the relatively opened art market and the distinct status of the artists in the Dutch Republic give a chance to artists to explore their own interest. Thus, still-life painters are mediators who seize the commodity, which is highly esteemed by society and represent it in their painting. And in a prosperous commercial society, the value of the goods resides in its marketing price. Under the hegemonic Dutch economy, everything obeys the law of the business, including art. In this sense, porcelain traded by Dutch East India company was a good choice for the artists to contain in their still-life paintings considering its social and economic connotation.

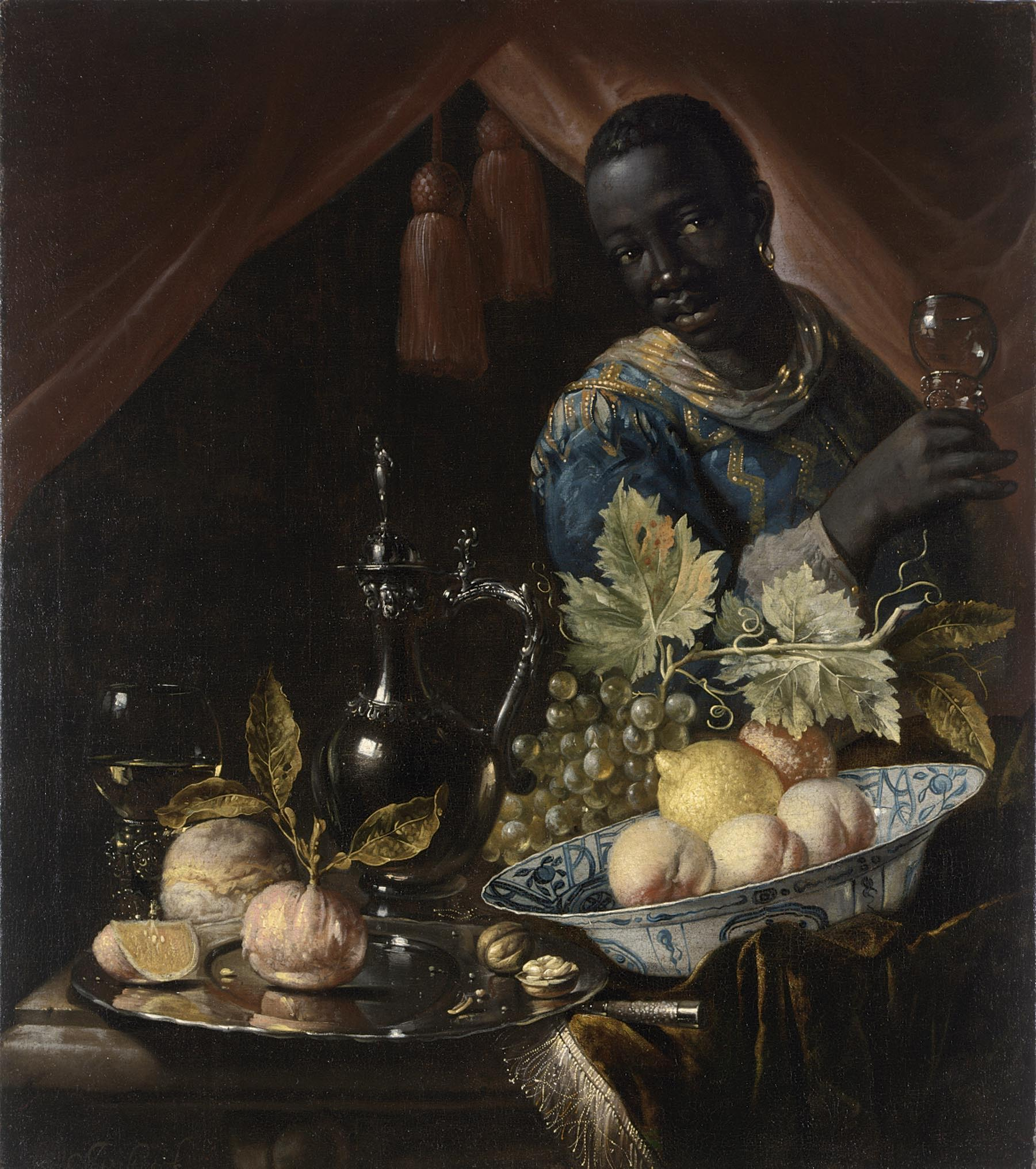
Juriaen van Streek 002

Moreover, the porcelain in Dutch still-life painting demonstrates how the material culture circulated and interacted around the world in the seventeenth century. This circulating process is also the process of domesticating the otherness. Like the connotations embedded in Juriaen van Streek’s painting Still Life with a Moor and Porcelain Vessels, these commodities and even human beings depicted in the painting come from completely different continents or cultures. The foreign material culture here is used to articulate the local identity of the Dutch.

=== France ===
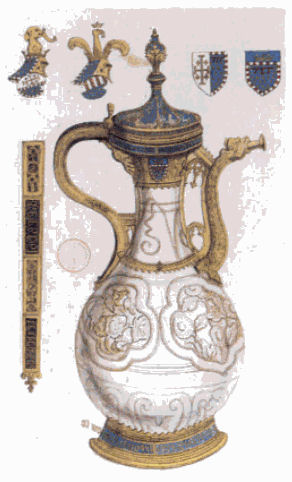
The 14th century Fonthill vase, painted by Barthélemy Remy in 1713.

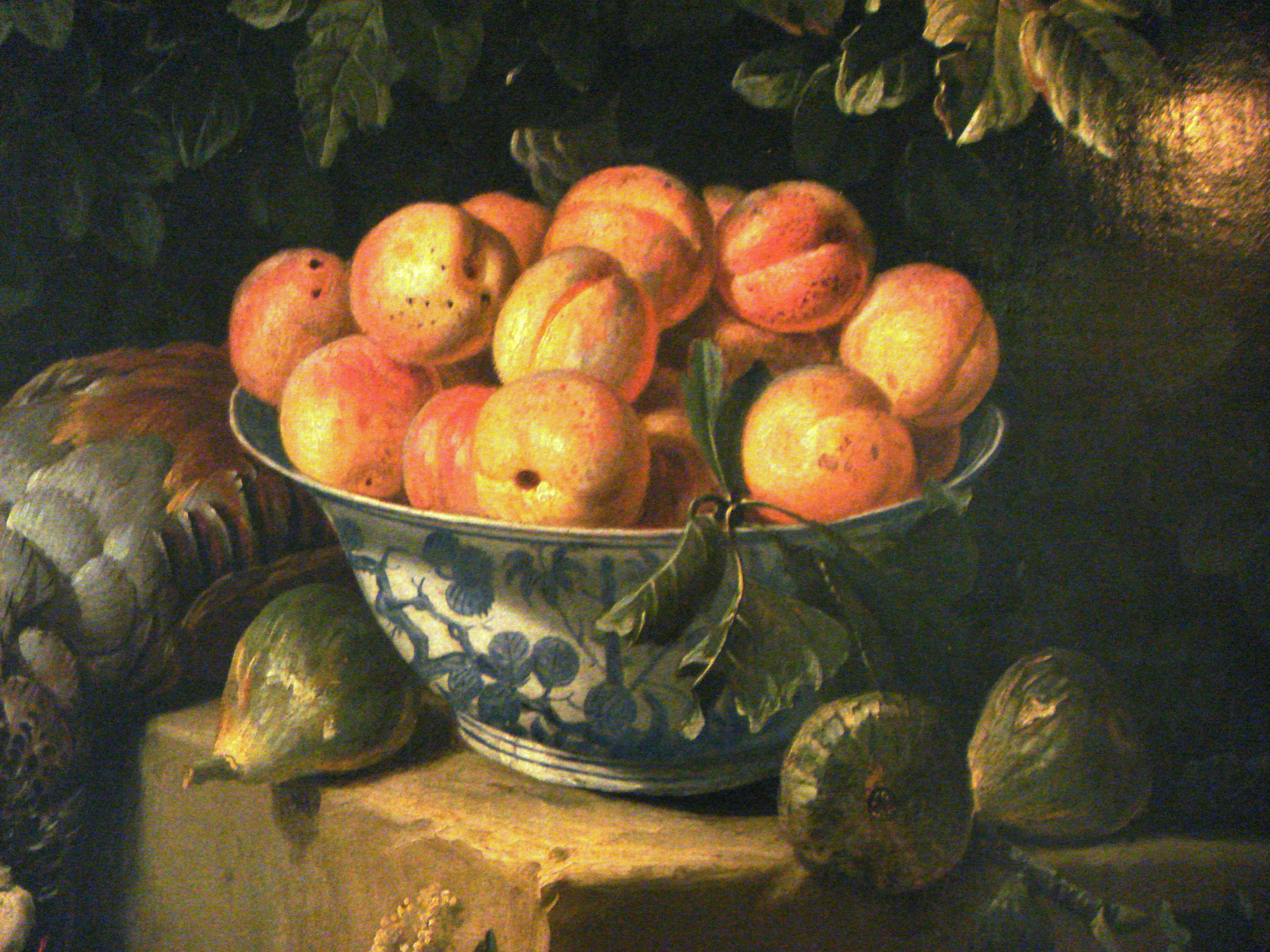
Nature morte au gibier et à la coupe de porcelaine (detail), François Desporte, c. 1700–1710.

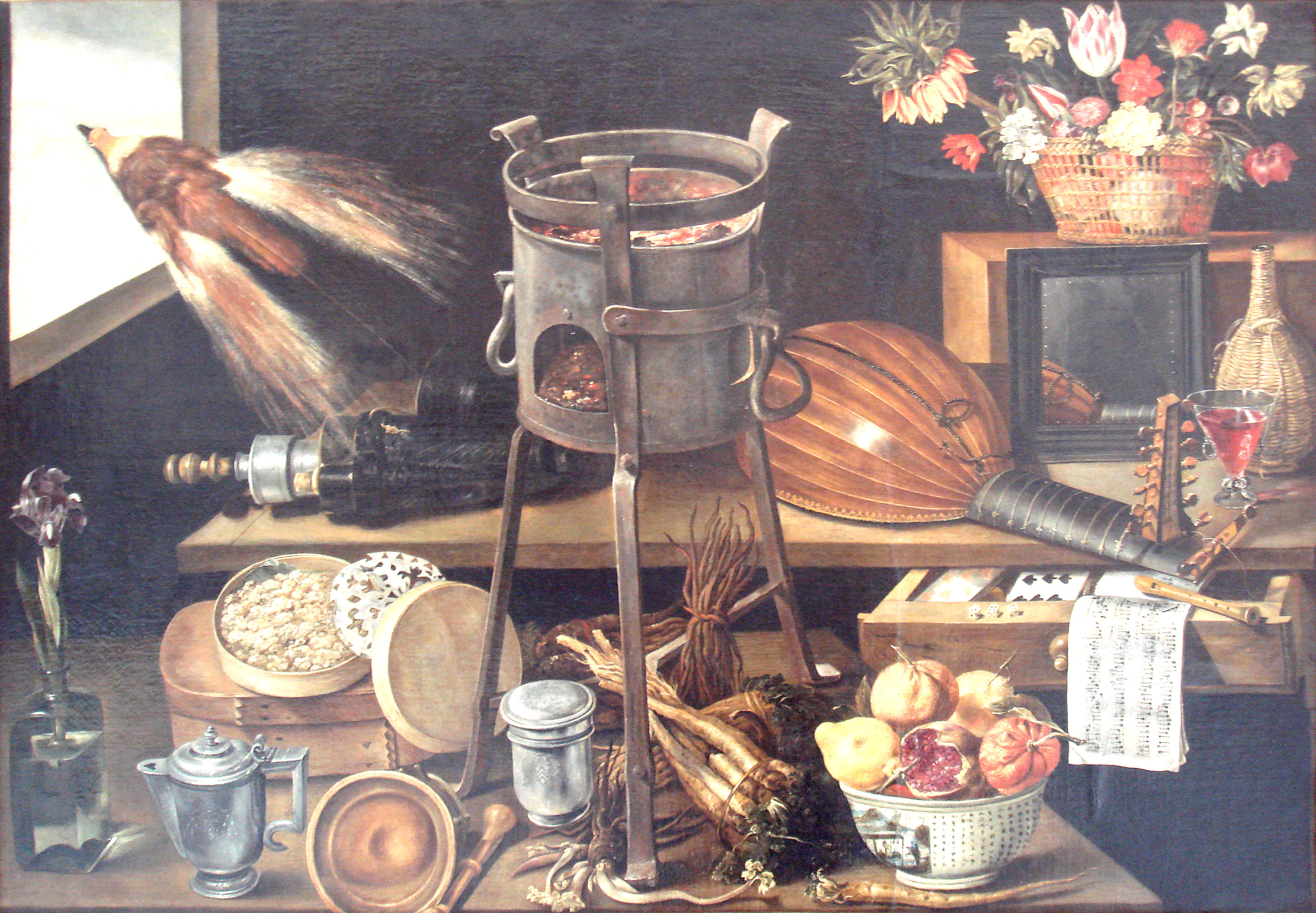
Jacques Linard, Les cinq sens et les quatre éléments, 1627.

== See also ==
- Chinese influences on Islamic pottery
- Pseudo-Kufic
