= François Roger de Gaignières =

French genealogist, antiquary and collector

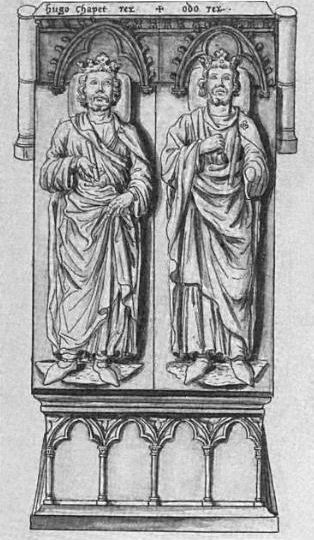
François Roger de Gagnieres drawing of the tombs of Eudes and Hugues Capet at Saint-Denis Abbey.

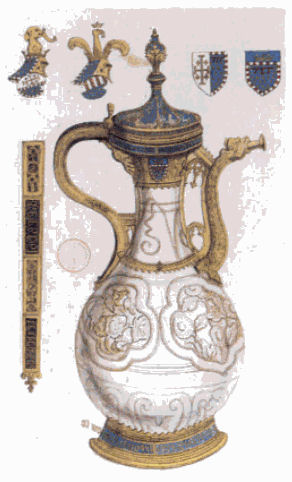
The Fonthill vase, painted by Barthélemy Remy, valet of François Roger de Gaignières, 1713.

François Roger de Gaignières (30 December 1642, Entrains-sur-Nohain – 1715, Paris), was a French genealogist, antiquary and collector.

== Life ==
He was the grandson of a merchant at Lyon and the son of Aimé de Gaignières, secretary to the Count of Harcourt, a member of the Elbeuf branch of the House of Guise. In the late 1660s, he was named écuyer (equerry) to Louis Joseph, duke of Guise. Residing in a fine new apartment just over the stables of the magnificently renovated Hôtel de Guise, François Roger supervised the duke's riding and oversaw his stables, carriages, and footmen. His immediate neighbors in the stable wing were the respected neo-Latinist and translator Philippe Goibaut, who directed the Guise musical ensemble, and composer Marc-Antoine Charpentier, who wrote for the Guise chapel and salon.

After the young duke's death in 1671, François Roger served as écuyer to Louis Joseph's aunt, Marie de Lorraine, who in 1679 appointed him governor of her principality of Joinville and obtained for him a royal pension of 500 écus.

At an early age, François Roger began to make a collection of original materials for history generally, and, in particular, for that of the French church and court. He soon was at the center of a group of art connoisseurs and historians that stretched from Paris to the court of the Grand Duke of Tuscany in Florence. Among the connoisseur-visitors to his apartment was Louis Courcillon ("abbé Dangeau"), and Coulanges, Mme de Sévigné's cousin. Dr. Martin Lister visited him at the Hôtel de Guise in 1698 and admired his collection.

In the early 1690s, Gaignières was made an "Instructor to the Children of France," that is, he showed his genealogical collection to several royal princes who were being educated. Among this princes was Philippe Duke of Chartres, to whom former Guise musicians Étienne Loulié and Marc-Antoine Charpentier were teaching musical theory and practice.

As Marie de Lorraine lay dying in 1688, François Roger de Gaignières had preserved many Guise papers from destruction and incorporated them into his collection. For a decade, he exerted his right to remain in his apartment at the Hôtel de Guise, but in 1698 he moved himself and his collection into a house he had built on the rue de Sèvres in the outskirts of the city. Germain Brice not only extolled the beauty of the house and its gardens, he also told how "the master to whom this house belongs lives in the finest apartment, which he has decorated with very beautiful furniture, gold cloth, and rare paintings. For a long time he has been amassing an incomparable cabinet."

Over the decades, Gaignières brought together a large collection of original letters and other documents, together with portraits and prints, and had copies made of a great number of the most curious antiquarian objects, such as seals, tombstones, stained glass, miniatures and tapestry. Many of the documents were copied by his valet, Barthélemy Remy, an excellent paleographer, while the illustrations were made by Louis Boudan, a painter-engraver whom he sent into the provinces to draw tombs.

In 1703, he offered his collection to Louis XIV, as the nucleus of a royal center that would produce certified copies of documents. The project was stillborn, so in 1711 he sold his entire collection to the king for 26,000 écus plus an annual pension of 4,000 livres. (William III of England, had offered 50,000 pounds, in vain.)

No sooner had he signed the contract negotiated by Pierre de Clairambault, the royal genealogist, than Gaignières found himself relegated to the top floor of his house, and the rooms containing his treasures padlocked. His health declined rapidly. He wrote his last will in December 1714, and died the following March.

Clairambault soon removed the collection from the rue de Sèvres and began to break it up. The manuscripts were divided between the Louvre and the Royal Library (now the Bibliothèque nationale de France); many of the 27,000 portraits went to the royal Estampes (today part of the Bibliothèque nationale); the printed material went to the archives of the Affaires Étrangères; and documents that took Clairambault's fancy were kept by him and merged with his own collection (today in the manuscript department of the Bibliothèque nationale). Some items are in the Bodleian Library at Oxford.

Two hundred years later, the drawings of François Roger de Gaignières were especially instrumental in Viollet-le-Duc's restoration effort for the Saint-Denis Abbey in the 19th century, following the destruction of the French Revolution.
