= Still Life with a Peacock =

1714 painting by Alexandre-François Desportes

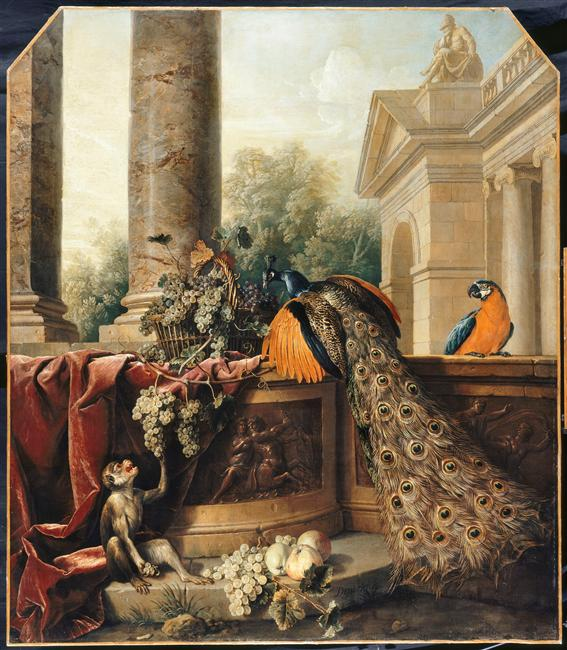
Still Life with a Peacock (1714) by Alexandre-François Desportes

Still Life with a Peacock is a 1714 oil on canvas painting by Alexandre-François Desportes, now in the Musée des Beaux-Arts de Lyon.

== Sources ==
- http://www.mba-lyon.fr/mba/sections/fr/collections-musee/peintures/oeuvres-peintures/xviiie_siecle/desportes_nature_mor
