= Alexandre-François Desportes =

French painter

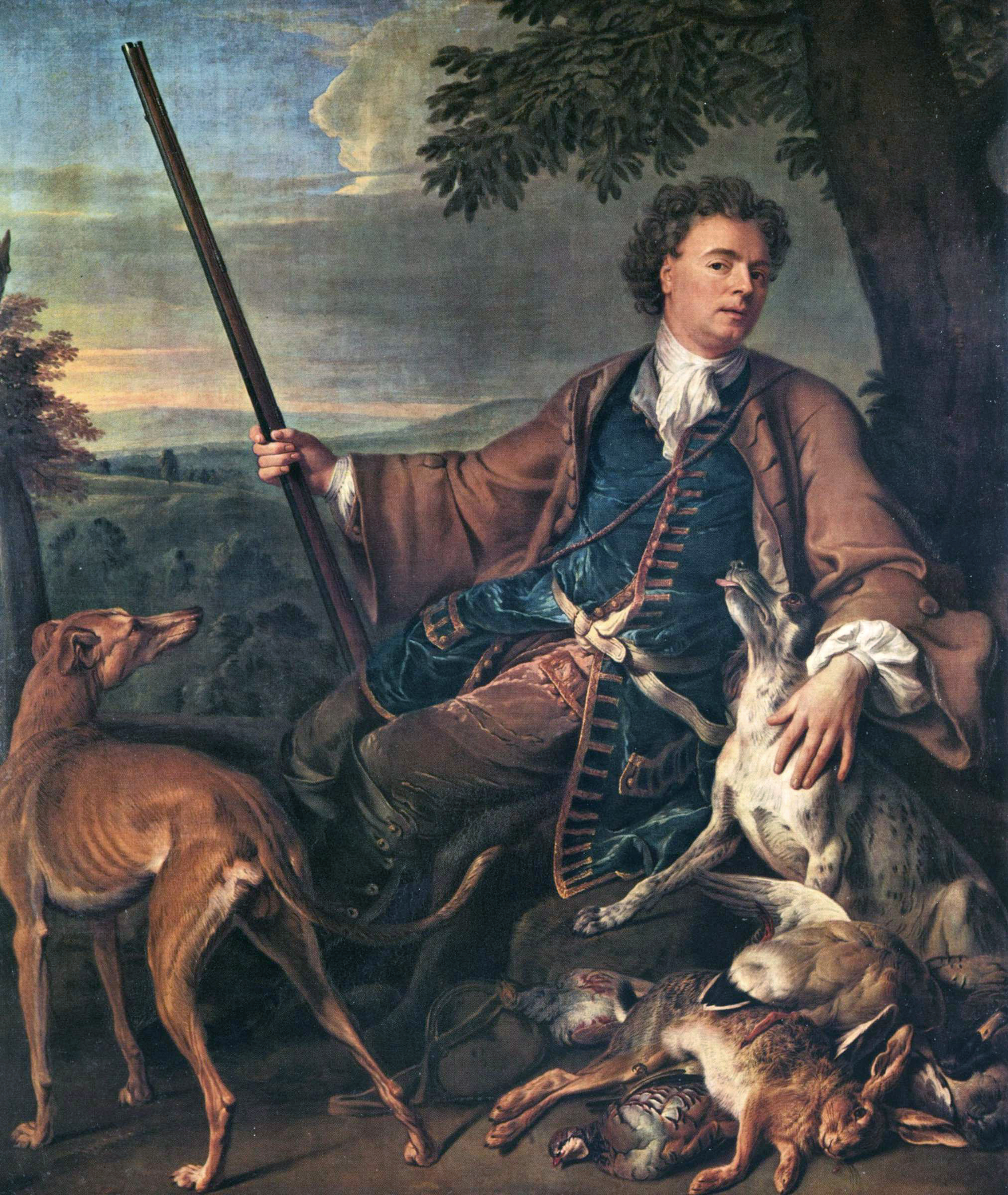
Autoportrait en chasseur (Self-portrait as hunter)

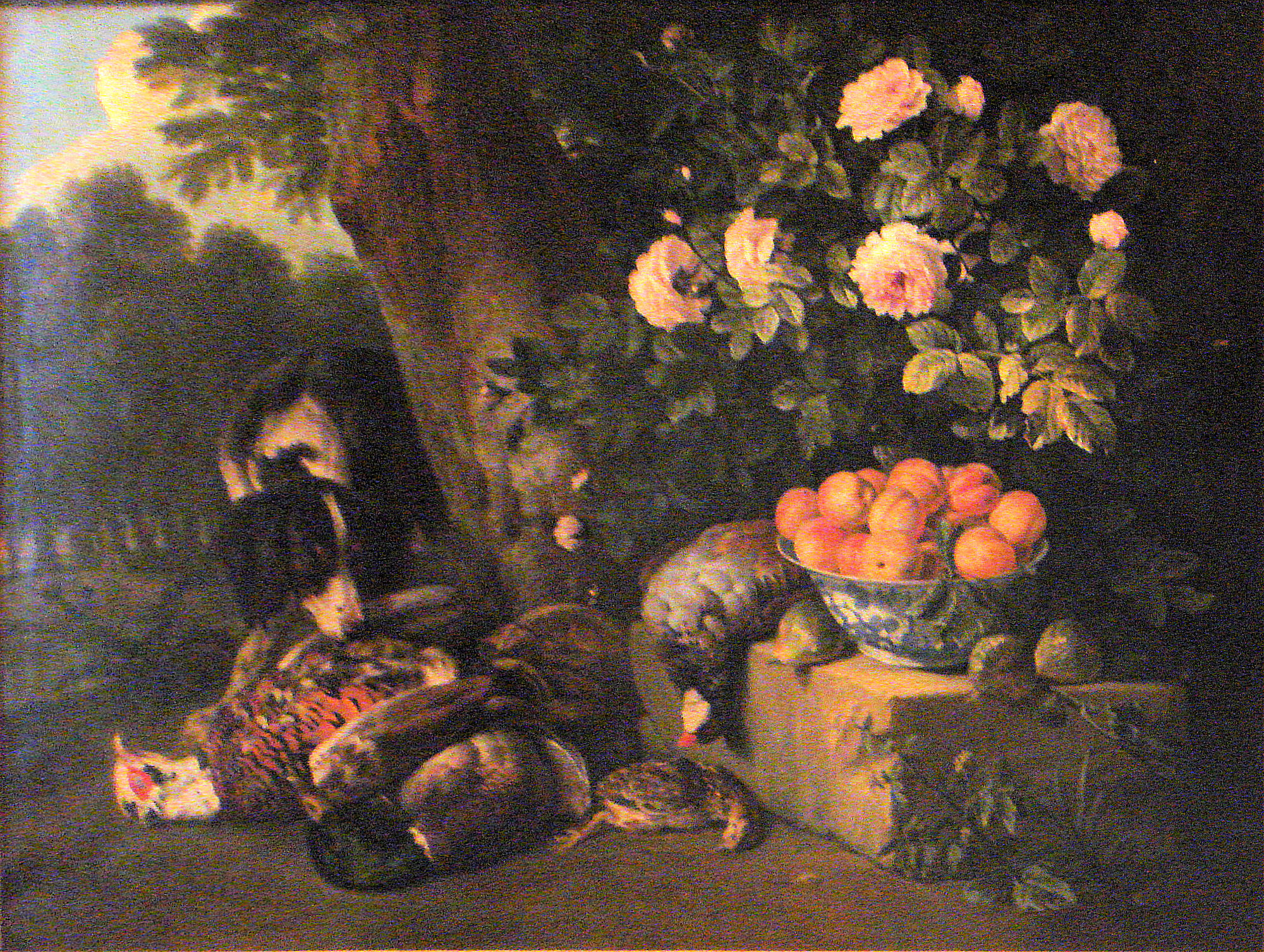
Nature morte au gibier et a la coupe de porcelaine by François Desportes, an example of Chinese porcelain in European painting, circa 1700–1710

Alexandre-François Desportes (French: [alɛksɑ̃dʁ fʁɑ̃swa depɔʁt]; 24 February 1661 — 20 April 1743) was a French painter and decorative designer who specialised in animals.

Desportes was born in Champigneulle, Ardennes. He studied in Paris, in the studio of the Flemish painter Nicasius Bernaerts, a pupil of Frans Snyders. During a brief sojourn in Poland, 1695–96, he painted portraits of John III Sobieski and Polish aristocrats; after the king's death Desportes returned to Paris, convinced that he should specialise in animals and flowers. He was received by the Académie de peinture et de sculpture in 1699, with the Self-Portrait in Hunting Dress now in the Musée du Louvre. In 1712–13 he spent six months in England. He received many commissions for decorative panels for the royal châteaux: Versailles, Marly, Meudon, Compiègne and, his last royal commission, for Louis XV at Choisy, 1742. He also did decorative paintings for the duc de Bourbon at Chantilly. Both Louis XIV and Louis XV commissioned portraits of their favorite hunting dogs.

Desportes would follow the royal hunt with a small notebook he carried to make on-site sketches for still lives of the game that resulted from the day's hunt, for the king to make a choice of which were to be worked up into finished paintings. In several paintings he combined game with a buffet of spectacular pieces of silver as they might be displayed in a dining room; these are precious documents of the lost silver of the reign of Louis XIV.

His details of trophies of game or animals were used in cartoons for tapestry in which work of several painters was combined, woven at the Savonnerie and at the Gobelins (Portière de Diane, Louvre). For the Gobelins he designed the series of tapestries called Les Nouvelles Indes (8 of them, woven in the Manufacture Les Gobelins in Paris, have been saved in Archbishop's palace in Prague).

At his death, in Paris, he left a considerable amount of work in his studio (where his nephew Nicolas had trained), which included studies of animals and plants as well as some fox-hunting sketches by Jan Fyt. In 1784, the comte d'Angiviller, general director of the Bâtiments du Roi acquired these resources for painter's models at the manufactory of Sèvres porcelain, so that Desportes' influence in the iconography of French arts extended almost throughout the century.

== See also ==
- Animalier
- Still Life with a Peacock
