= Champigneulle =

- Commune
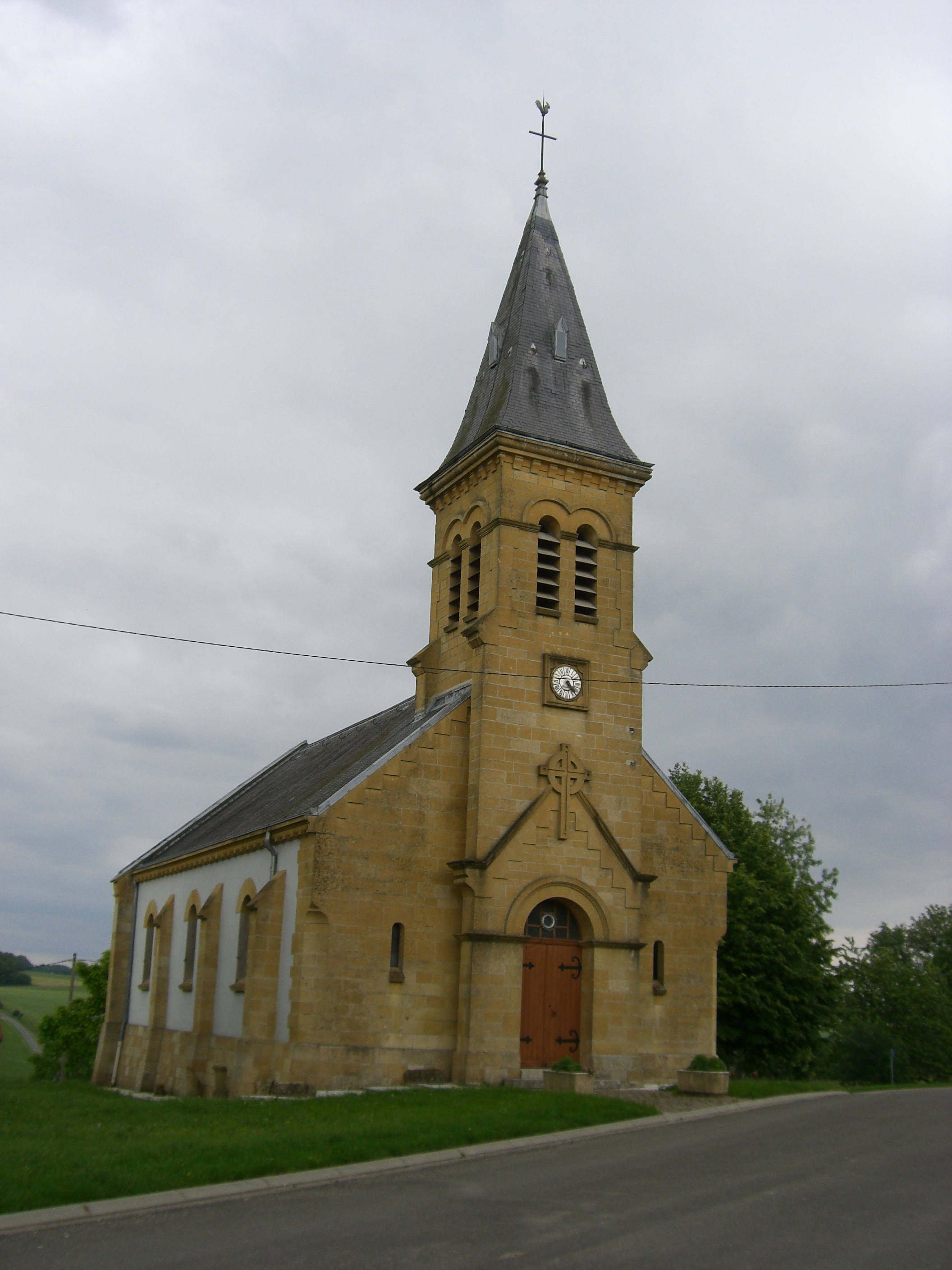
- The church in Champigneulle

- Coat of arms
- Location of Champigneulle
- Location within France Location within Grand Est
- Coordinates: 49°21′07″N 4°55′28″E
- Country: France
- Region: Grand Est
- Department: Ardennes
- Arrondissement: Vouziers
- Canton: Attigny
- Intercommunality: Argonne Ardennaise

Government
  - Mayor (2020–2026): Pierre Laurent-Chauvet
- Area^{1}: 7.73 km^{2} (2.98 sq mi)
- Elevation: 165 m (541 ft)
- Highest elevation: 201 m (659 ft)
- Lowest elevation: 117 m (384 ft)
- Population (2023): 53
  - Density: 6.9/km^{2} (18/sq mi)
- Time zone: UTC+01:00 (CET)
  - Summer (DST): UTC+02:00 (CEST)
- INSEE/Postal code: 08098 /08250
- ^{1} French Land Register data, which excludes lakes, ponds, glaciers > 1 km^{2} (0.386 sq mi or 247 acres) and river estuaries.

Champigneulle (French pronunciation: [ʃɑ̃piɲœl]) is a commune in the Ardennes department in northern France. It is the birthplace of the painter Alexandre-François Desportes.

== Population ==
Historical population
Year	Pop.	±% p.a.
1968	115	—
1975	91	−3.29%
1982	77	−2.36%
1990	67	−1.72%
1999	64	−0.51%
2007	76	+2.17%
2012	58	−5.26%
2017	59	+0.34%
2023	53	−1.77%
Source: INSEE

== See also ==
- Communes of the Ardennes department
