= Louis Boudan =

French painter

Louis Boudan (16??–17??) was an artist who worked for François Roger de Gaignières, a French genealogist, antiquary and collector who was active in the late 17th and early 18th centuries.

Boudan carried out commissions for de Gaignières for over 30 years. Most of his work for de Gaignières was done between 1695 and 1715 when he, de Gaignières and the latter's secretary, Barthélemy Remy, toured France to carry out a survey of historical monuments. Boudan's work makes up the bulk of the Recueil de Gaignières, a collection of engravings gathered by de Gaignières over the course of his life. It was donated to Louis XIV and most of the folio plates created for de Gaignières by Boudan are today held by the Bibliothèque nationale de France.

== Gallery ==
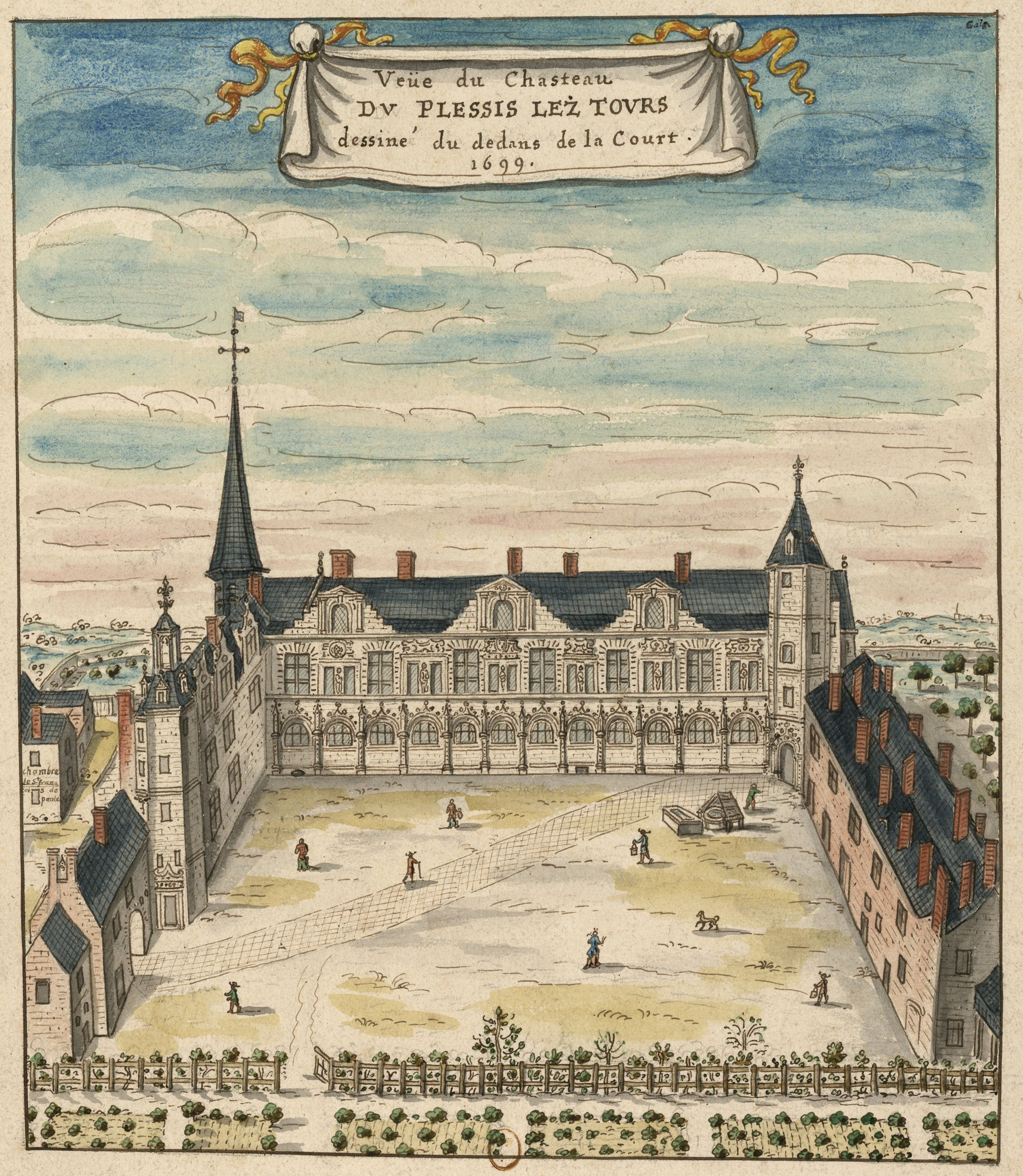
Château de Plessis-lez-Tours (1699)

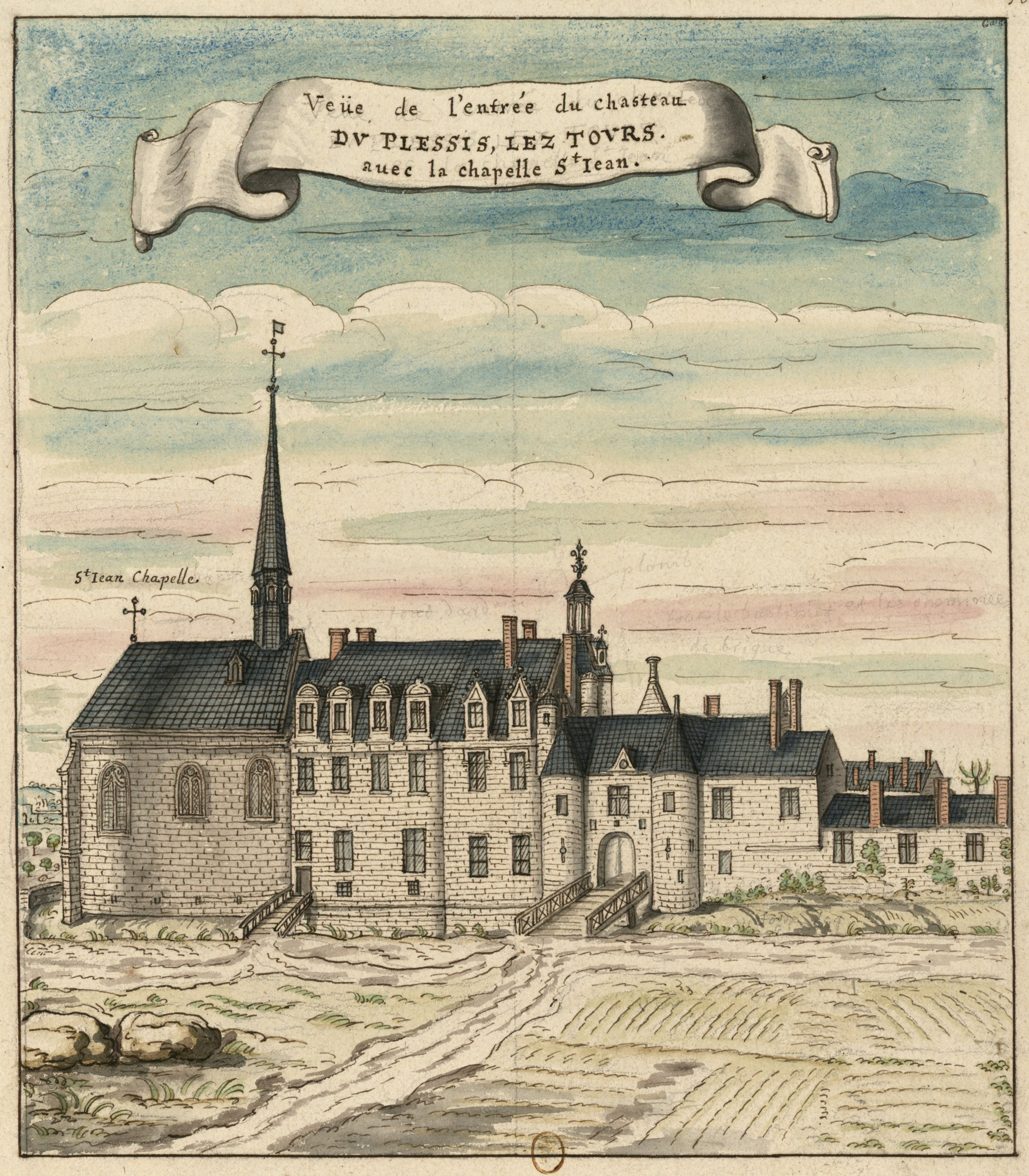
Château de Plessis-lez-Tours

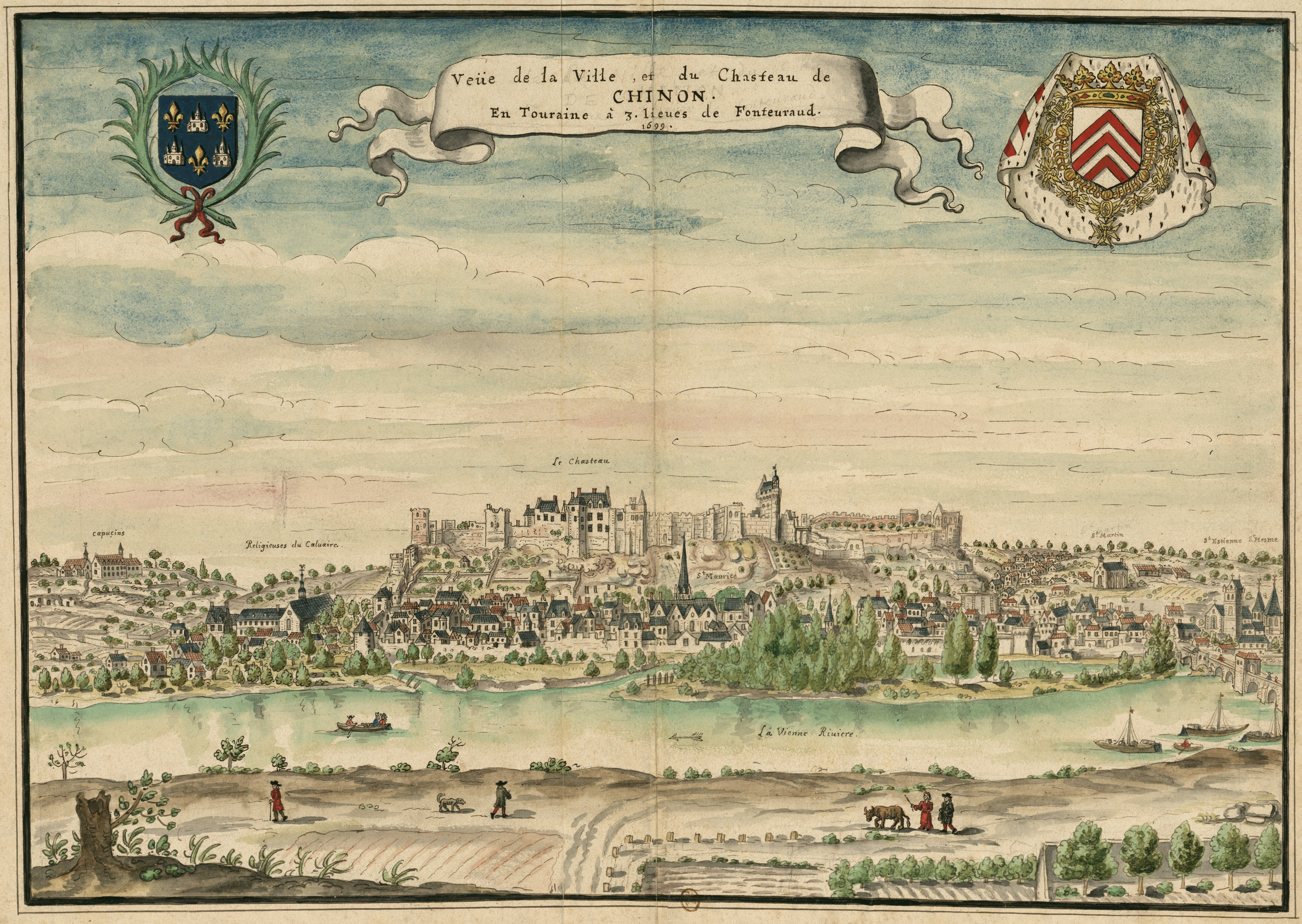
Château de Chinon (1699)

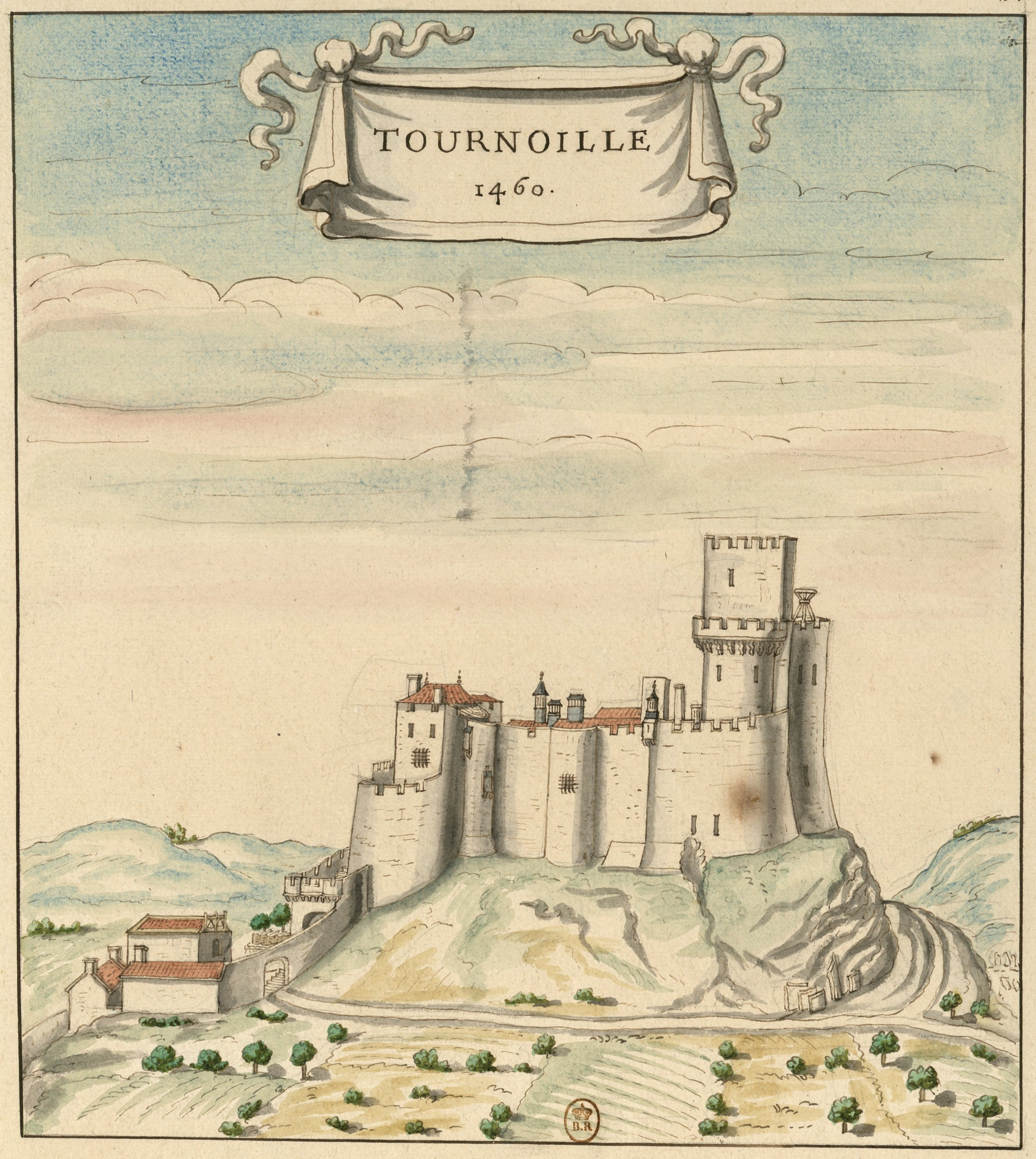
Château de Tournoël

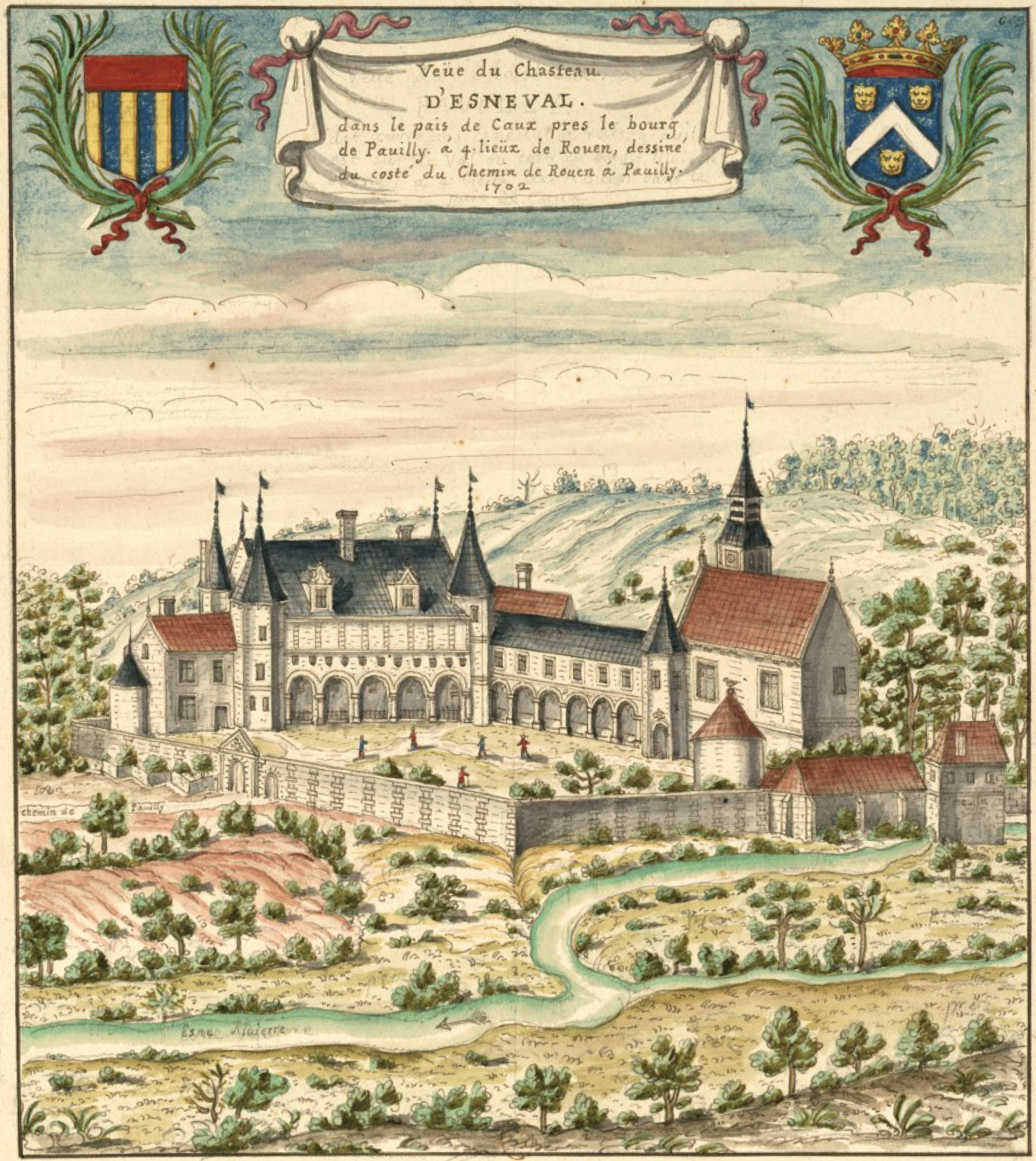
Château d'Acquigny in Pays de Caux near the village of Pavilly (1702)

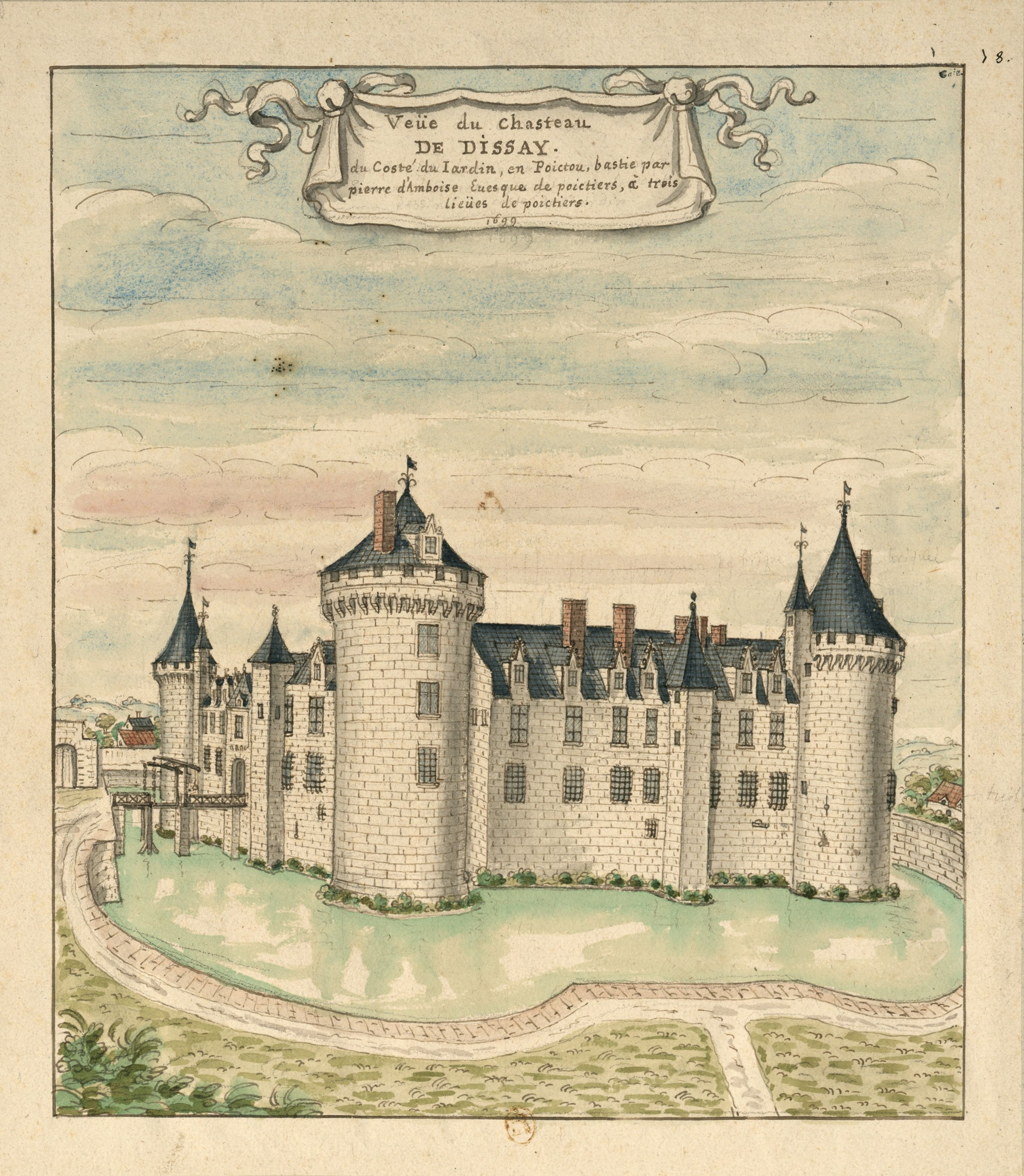
Castle of Dissay

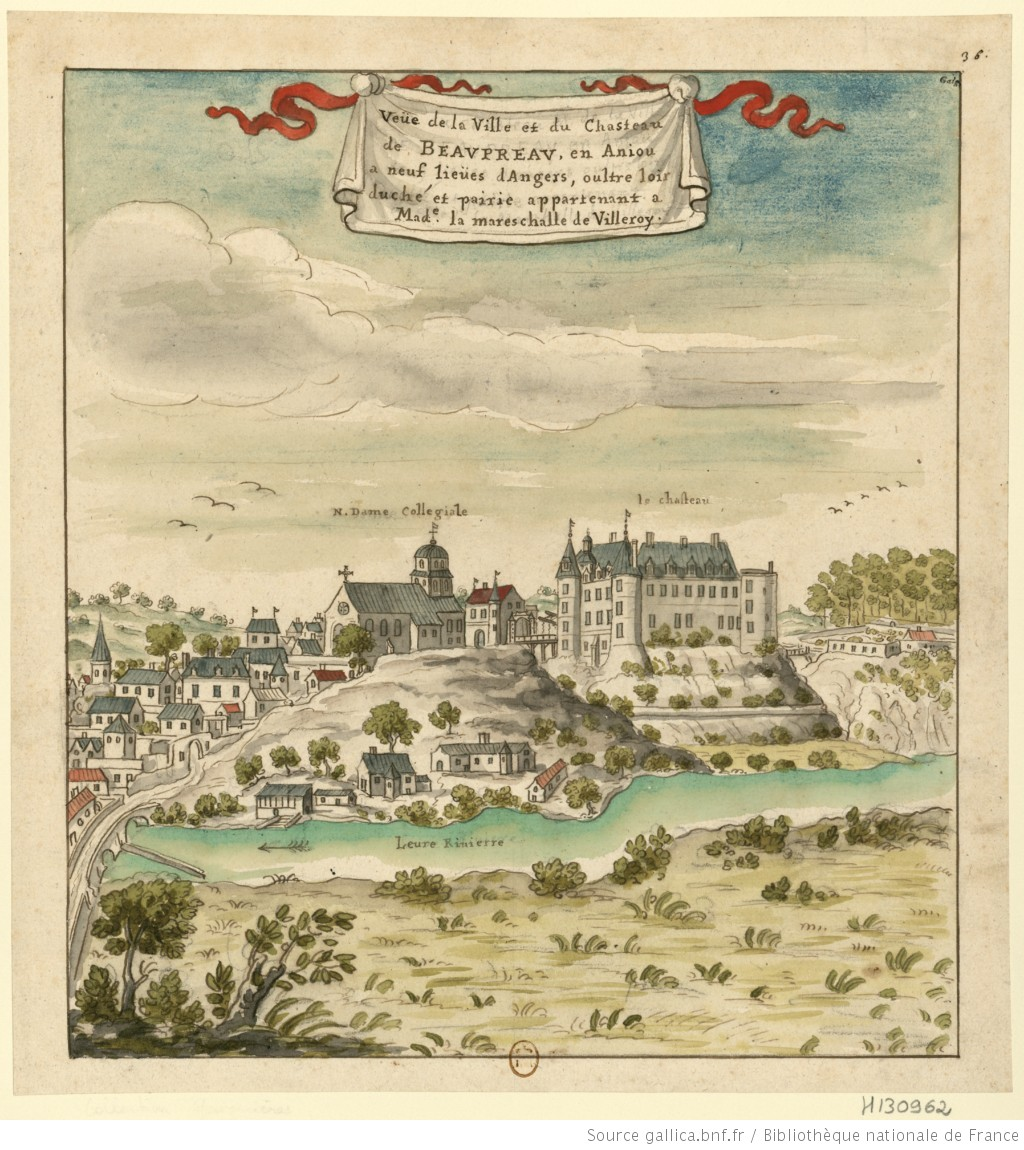
Chasteau de Beaupréau

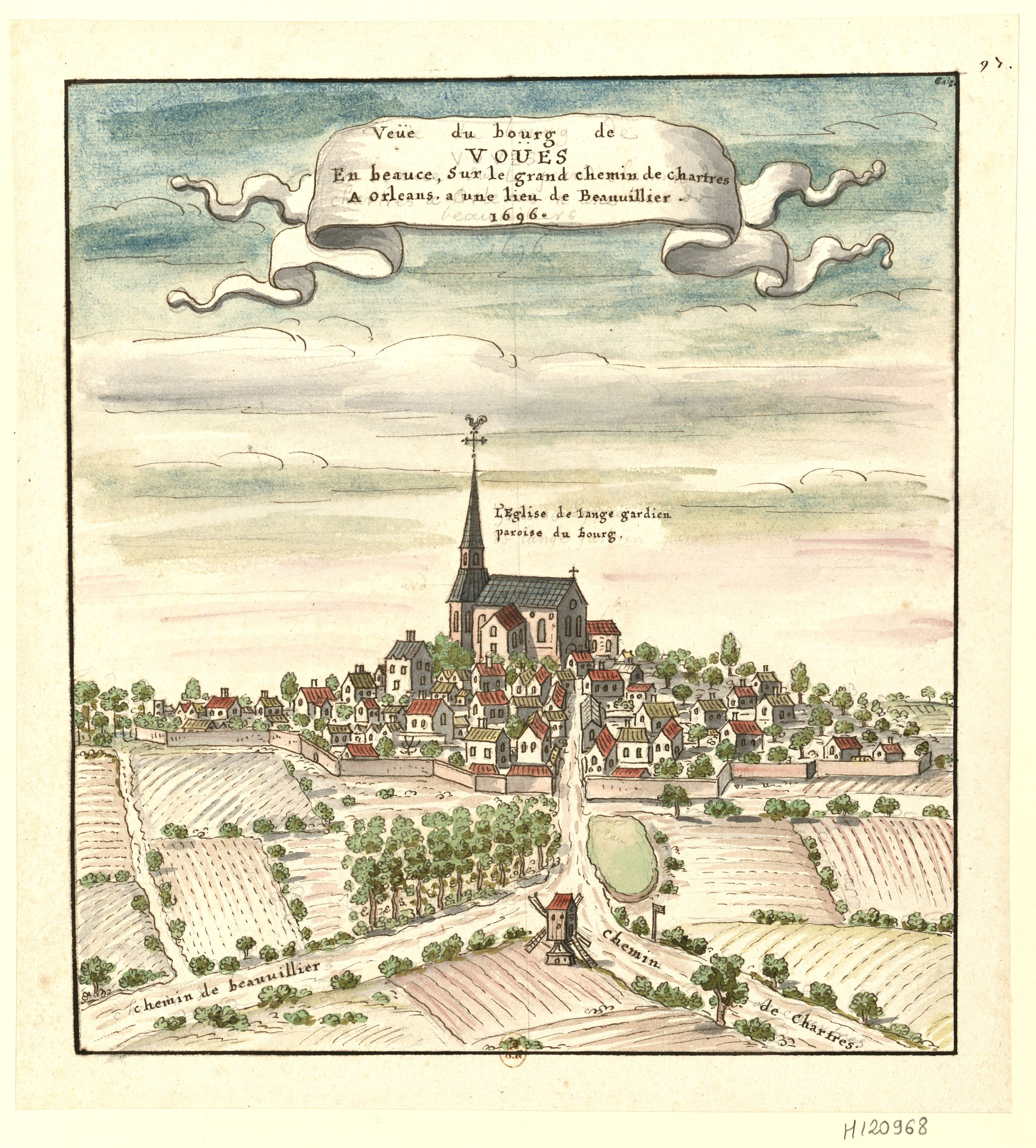
Eure-et-Loir

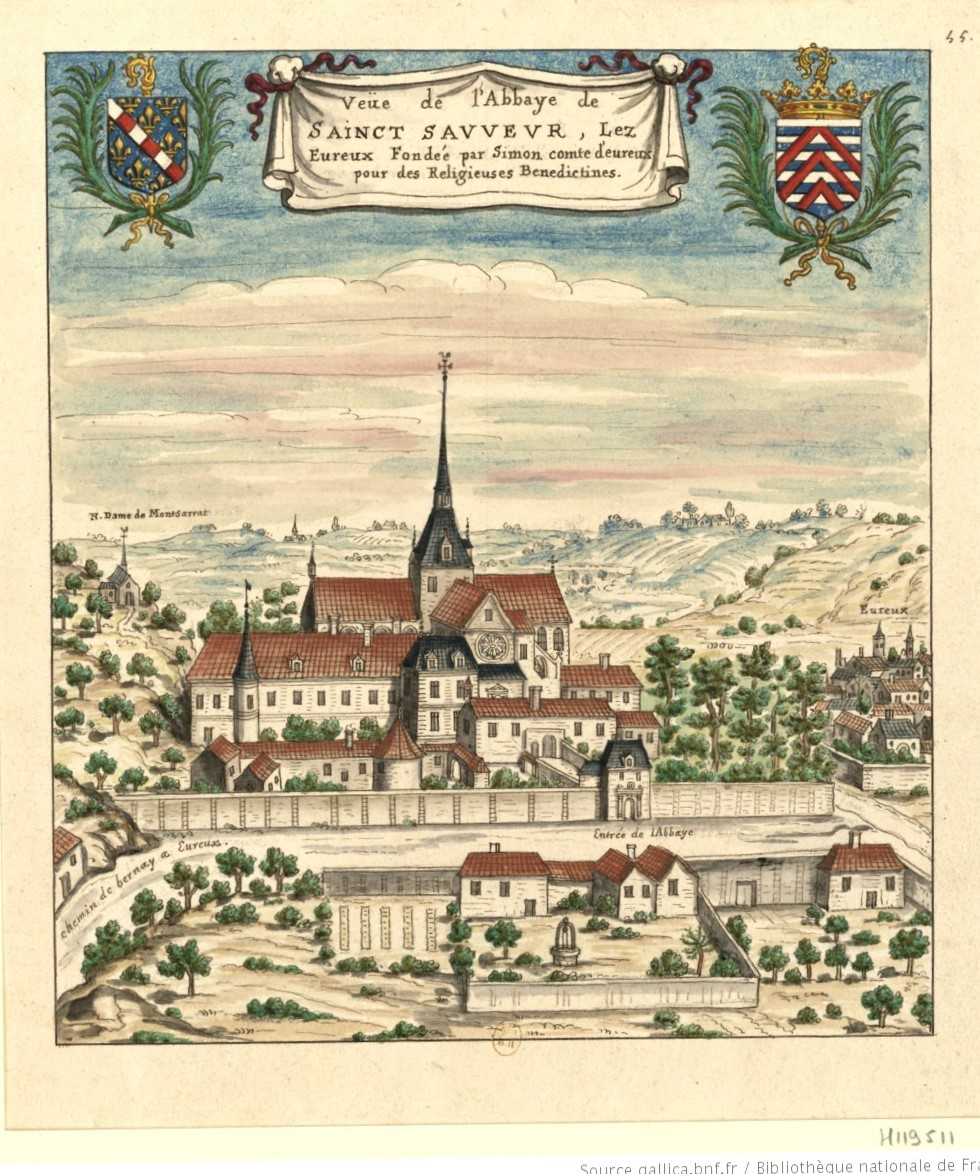
Abbey of Saint-Sauveur-le-Vicomte

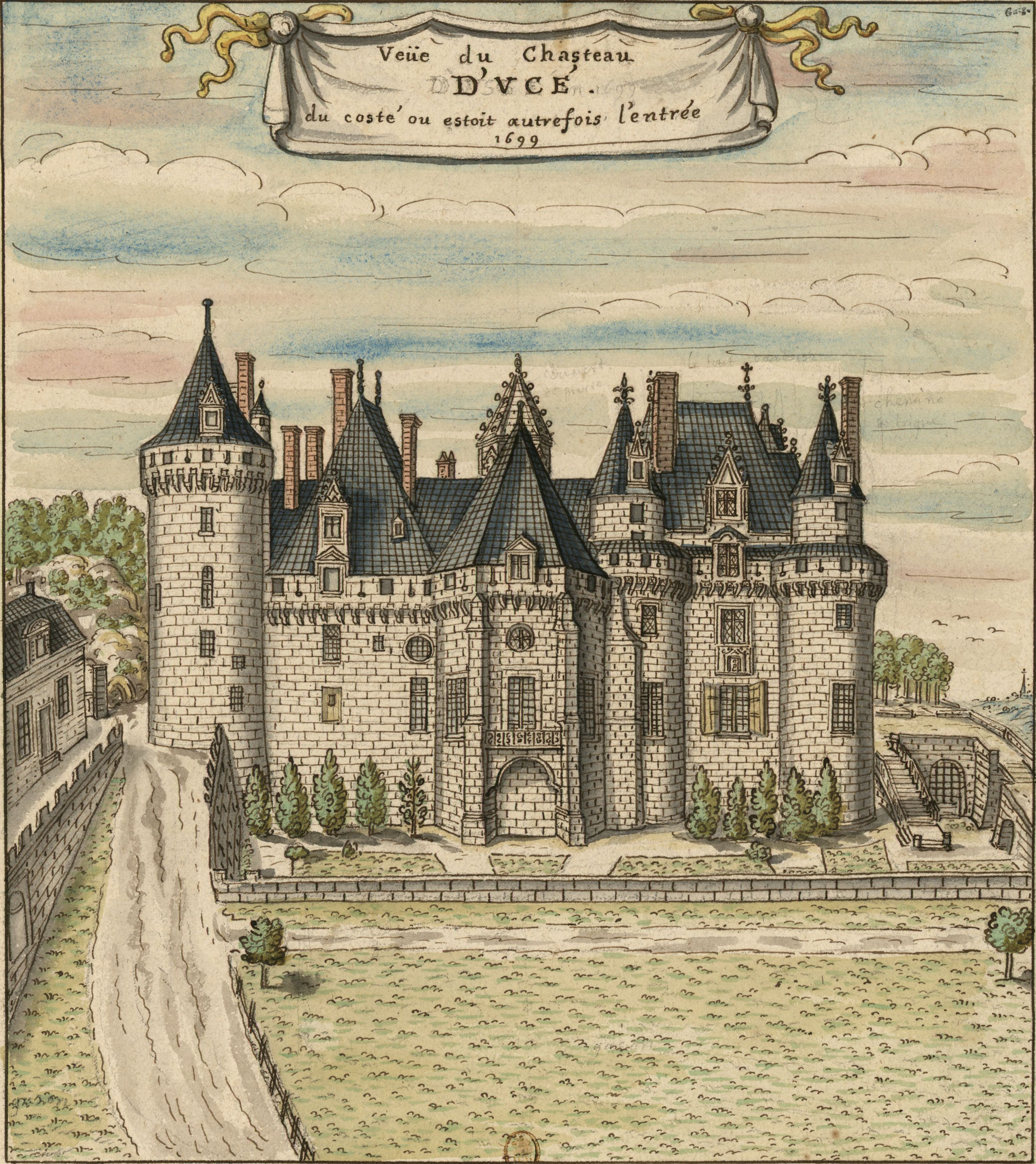
Château d'Ussé in Indre-et-Loire (1699)

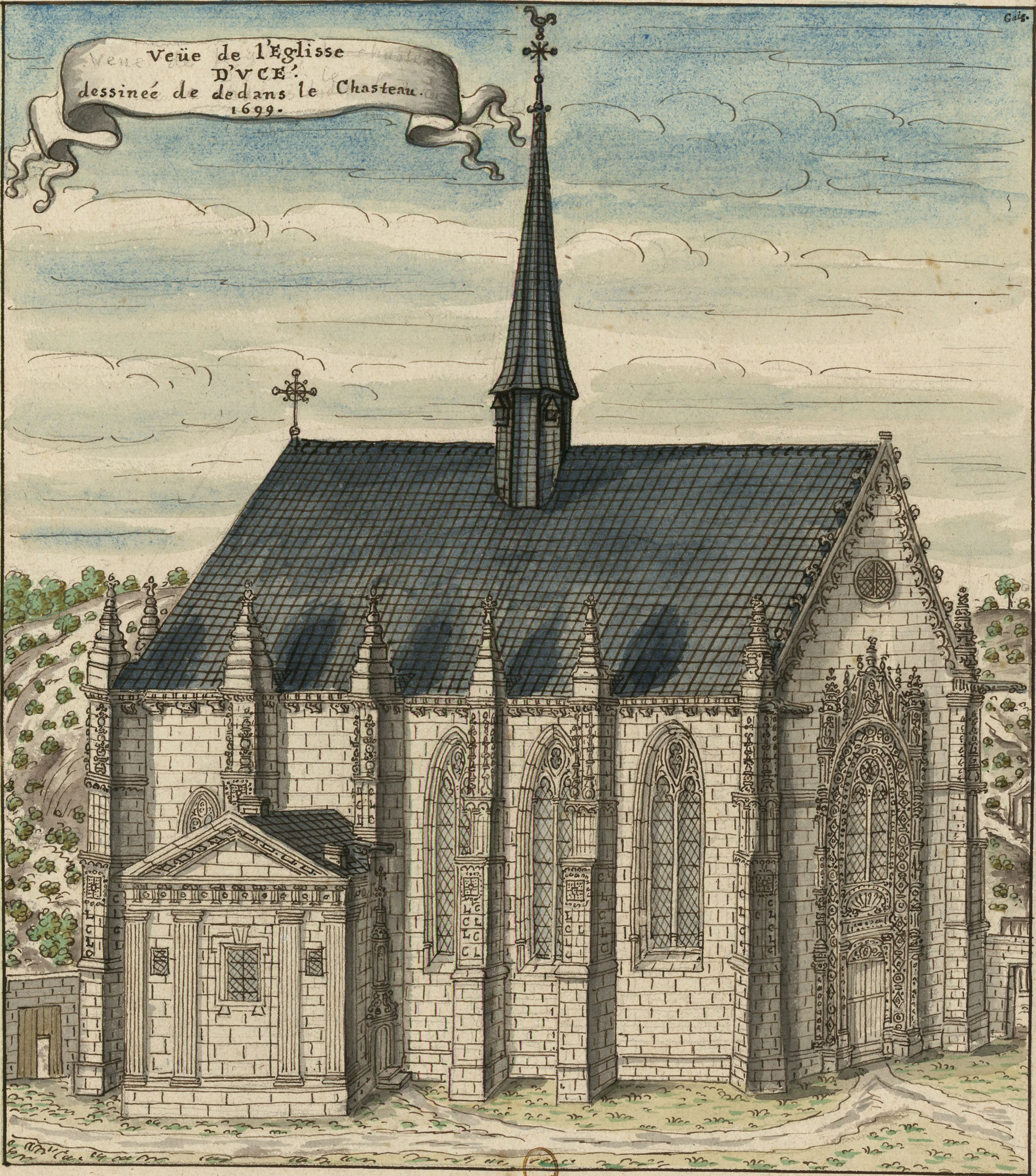
Château d'Ussé

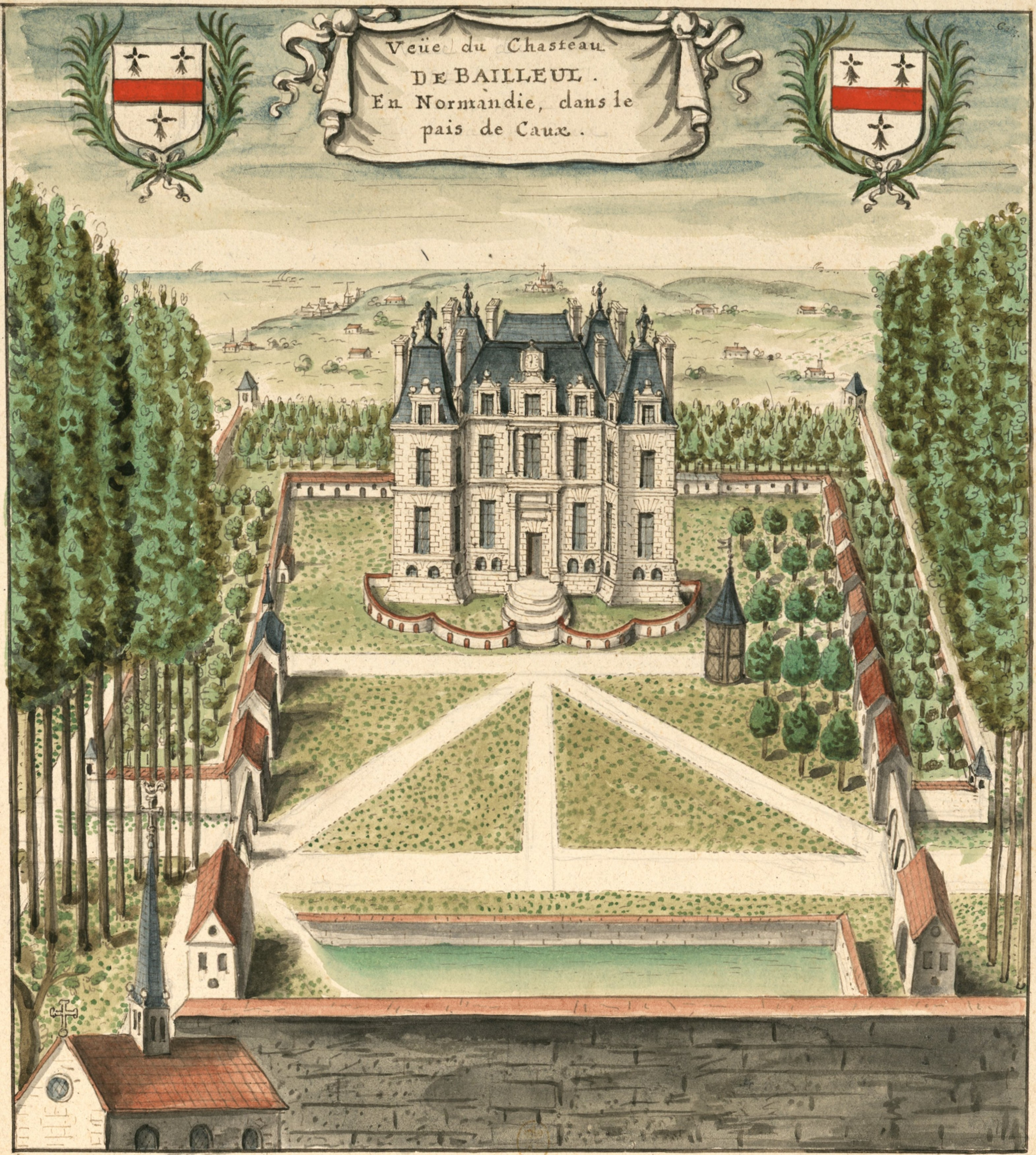
Schloss Bailleul, Normandie (1696)

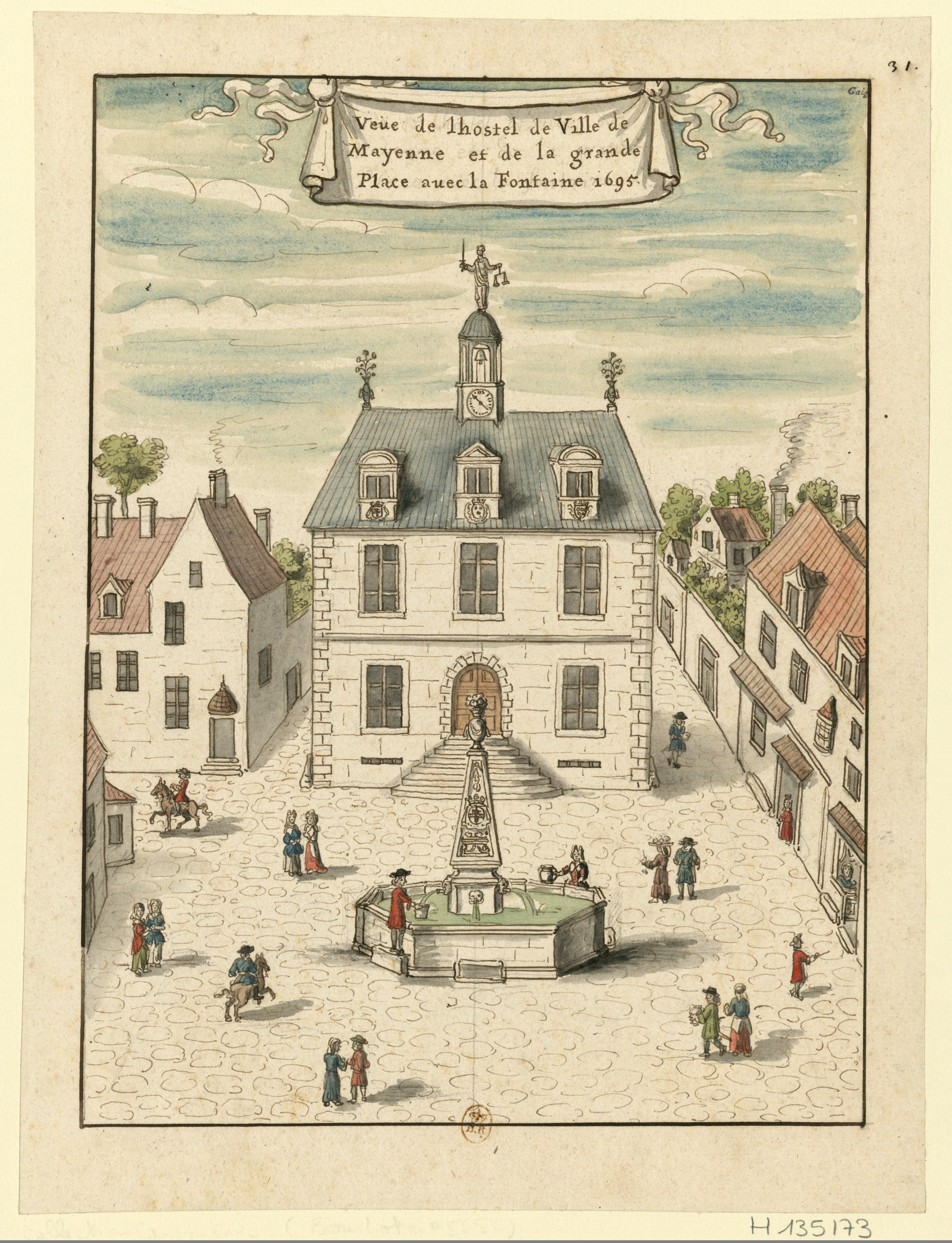
Ville de Mayenne and the main square with the Fountain (1695)
