= Nicolas Desportes =

French painter

Nicolas Desportes (1718–1787) was a French painter, specialising in representations of animals and hunting scenes.

Desportes was born in Busancy. He trained under his uncle Alexandre-François Desportes, an animal painter to king Louis XV, thus gaining the nickname "Desportes le neveu" (Desportes the nephew). Nicolas was admitted to the Académie royale de peinture et de sculpture in 1723. On his uncle's death, he sold his studio contents to the Manufacture de Sèvres. He died in Paris.

== Bibliography ==
- (in French) Antoine Joseph Dezallier d'Argenville, Abrégé de la vie des plus fameux peintres, avec leurs portraits gravés en taille-douce, les indications de leurs principaux ouvrages, quelques réflexions sur leurs caractères, et la manière de connoître les desseins des grands maîtres. Par M*** de l'Académie royale des sciences de Montpellier […]. Nouvelle édition, revue, corrigée & augmentée de la Vie de plusieurs peintres, Paris, de Bure, IV, 1762, p. 323.
- (in French) Jean-Baptiste Joseph Boulliot, Biographie ardennaise, ou Histoire des Ardennais qui se sont fait remarquer, par leurs écrits, leurs actions, leurs vertus, ou leur erreurs, Paris, 1830, I, p. 347.
- (in French) Karl-Heinrich von Heinecken, Dictionnaire des artistes, dont nous avons des estampes avec une notice détaillée de leurs ouvrages gravés, Leipzig, 1790, IV, p. 620.
