= Fonthill Vase =

Chinese porcelain vase

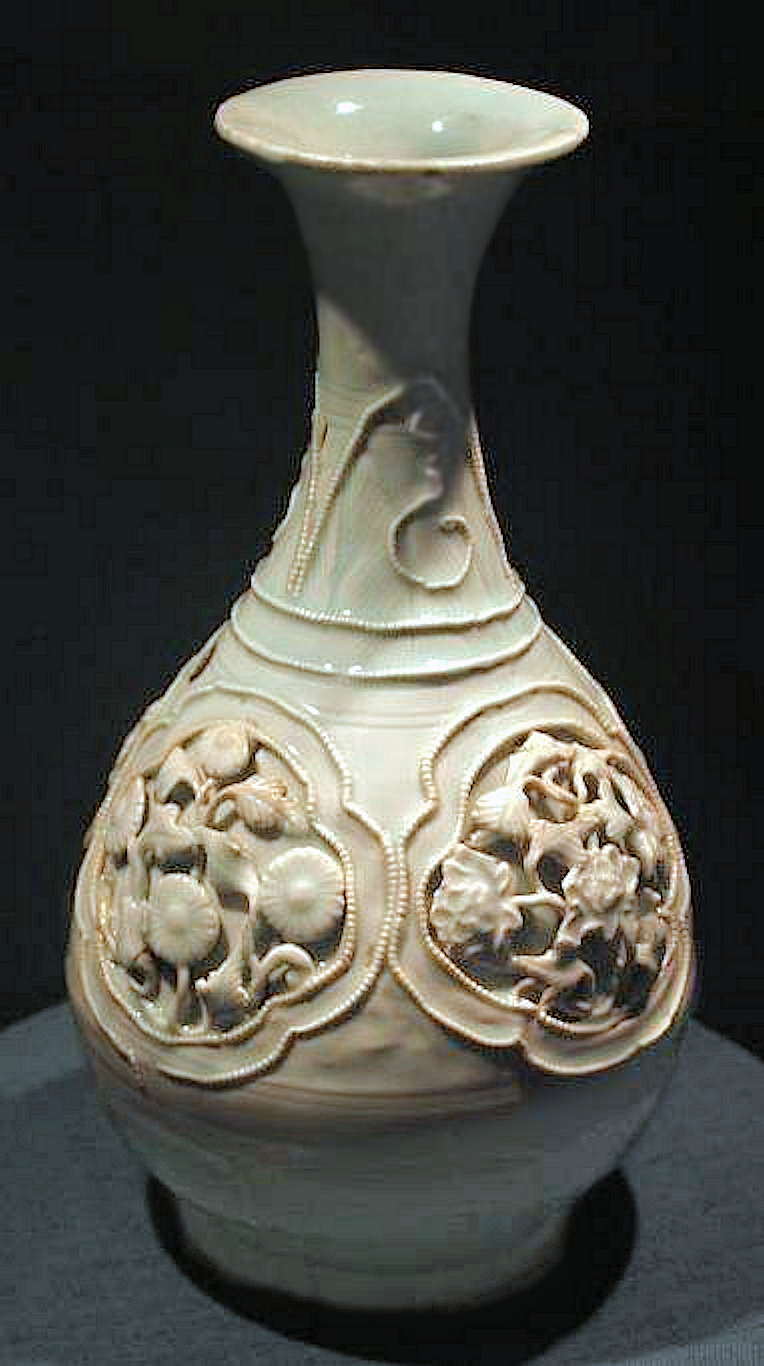
The Fonthill Vase in the National Museum of Decorative Art, Dublin

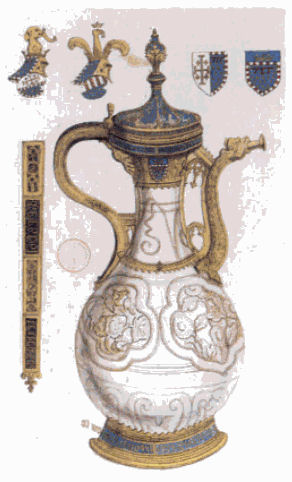
Fonthill vase, by Barthélemy Remy, valet of François Roger de Gaignières, 1713. The drawings in the upright and upleft corner depict the coat-of-arms of Louis the Great of Hungary

The Fonthill Vase, also called the Gaignières-Fonthill Vase after François Roger de Gaignières and William Beckford's Fonthill Abbey, is a bluish-white Qingbai Chinese porcelain vase dated to 1300–1340 AD. It is famous as the earliest documented Chinese porcelain object to have reached Europe.

The vase is an early piece of Jingdezhen porcelain, and comes from the final years of Qingbai ware in Jingdezhen before it was replaced by the new blue and white porcelain, which started in earnest after 1320. It is an unusual "experimental" vase with applied relief decoration in the medallions, in the usual monochrome blueish-white Qingbai glaze.

After probably arriving in Europe when nearly new, the history of the vase can mostly be documented. Eventually it reached the National Museum of Ireland in 1882, and in 2018 was on display in the "Curator's Choice" permanent display at the National Museum of Ireland – Decorative Arts and History (Collins Barracks, Dublin).

== History ==
The vase was first part of a collection of Louis the Great of Hungary, who seems to have received it from a Chinese embassy on its way to visiting Pope Benedict XII in 1338. The vase was then mounted with a silver handle and base, transforming it into a ewer and transferred as a gift to his Angevin kinsman Charles III of Naples in 1381.

Various subsequent owners are known, such as the duc de Berry and Louis, Grand Dauphin (son of Louis XIV). By the end of the 17th century, the vase was in the possession of François Lefebvre de Caumartin, who let it be represented in a watercolour painting by François Roger de Gaignières in 1713. The vase was later in the possession of William Beckford at Fonthill Abbey, and was then sold to John Farquhar in 1822.

Its silver mounts were removed in the 19th century, and the vase reappeared in 1882 at a sale of Beckford's heirs at Hamilton Palace without its mount, "and its history had somehow been forgotten". It was bought by the National Museum of Ireland for about £28. It was only in 1959 that Arthur Lane, the ceramics curator of the Victoria and Albert Museum in London, reconnected the vase with its earlier history.

Jean, duc de Berry is known to have had a similar Chinese porcelain vase in his collection when he died in 1416, although it is unknown how he acquired it. This indicates that "the Gaignieres-Fonthill vase was not the only specimen of its kind [in Europe at the time]". These vases testify to a lost era of exchanges between China and Europe during Medieval times, which can also be seen in pictorial arts with the adoption of some Chinese stylistic conventions in Western painting, such as in the works of Giotto and his followers.

== Sources ==
- Fuchs, Ronald W. II, "A History of Chinese Export Porcelain in Ten Objects" (as "Vase", first object), Ceramics in America 2014, Chipstone Foundation (with good photo)
