= Barthélemy Remy =

French painter

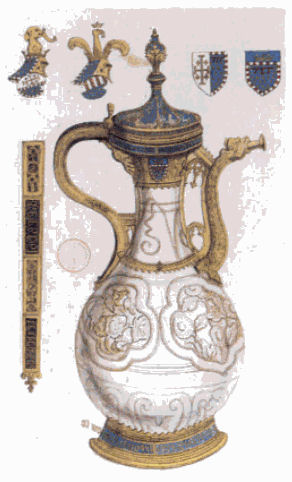
Fonthill vase, by Barthélemy Remy, valet of François Roger de Gaignières, 1713.

Barthélemy Rémy was the secretary of François Roger de Gaignières and an artist who painted numerous historical artefacts for his master. Barthélemy Rémy and François Roger de Gaignières, as well as Louis Boudan traveled throughout France to make paintings and records of French monuments.

The drawings were especially instrumental in Viollet-le-Duc's restoration effort for the Saint-Denis Abbey in the 19th century, following the destruction of the French Revolution.
