= Gaspard de Schomberg =

French soldier, courtier, and diplomat

- comte de Nanteuil
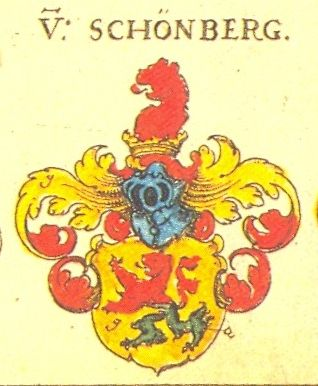
- Schomberg coat of arms
- Born: c. 1540
- Died: 17 March 1599
- Noble family: House of Schomberg
- Spouse: Jeanne de Chasteigner
- Issue: Henri de Schomberg
- Father: Wolf von Schönberg
- Mother: Brigitta von Schönberg

Gaspard de Schomberg, comte de Nanteuil (c. 1540 –17 March 1599) was a French soldier, courtier, diplomat, statesman and governor during the French Wars of Religion. Of Saxon descent, Gaspard naturalised as French. He began his career during the first French War of Religion, when he fought with the Protestants against the crown, raising mercenaries in the Holy Roman Empire for the prince of Condé. The crown was impressed with his abilities, and co-opted his services, during the third civil war he would fight against the Protestants. In 1570 he was made a gentilhomme de la chambre du roi, and then a Chambellan and in these years he would conduct a series of diplomatic missions to further French foreign policy with the princes of the empire. In 1573 he helped prepare the way for Anjou, travel to his new kingdom, the Polish-Lithuanian Commonwealth. When Anjou returned to France as Henri III Schomberg supported him in the civil war he inherited, reporting on the mercenary situation in the empire, and fighting at the Battle of Dormans. His wealth during this period allowed him to take advantage of the Duke of Guise's financial woes, securing for himself the county of Nanteuil-le-Haudoin in 1578 for several hundred thousand livres.

When the second Catholic ligue declared war on the crown in opposition to the prospect of the Protestant Navarre inheriting the throne, Schomberg was again tasked with raising mercenaries in the Empire. He was unable to do so however as the duke of Guise captured the border cities of Toul and Verdun, and instead participated in the peace negotiations and attempted reconciliation between Guise and the king's favourite Épernon. The peace between Henri and the ligue lasted until the final rupture in which Henri assassinated the duke in December 1588. Schomberg played a central role in the negotiations for an alliance between Henri and Navarre that established a united front against the ligue. With the assassination of Henri III in turn, Schomberg was among those nobles who switched their allegiance to Navarre, who now styled himself Henri IV. He fought at the royalist victory of Ivry where he led the right. In 1593 during the ligueur Estates General he was among the royal delegation that established a truce with the ligue. In early 1594, he assisted in the capitulation of Paris to the royalists, and soon thereafter took on a royal on the king's conseil des finances. Henri had by now abandoned his Protestantism, and many of his former co-religionists were frustrated with him. Schomberg led negotiations with them in 1595 after the fall of Amiens to the Spanish, to try and convince them to support Henri. He ultimately agreed to a series of concessions that would form the basis of the Edict of Nantes. Still at work planning the implementation of the Edict of Nantes he died on 13 March 1599.

== Early life and family ==
Gaspard de Schomberg was born in 1540, the son of the son of Wolf von Schönberg and Brigitta von Schönberg. Originally from Saxony, Schomberg naturalised as a Frenchman in 1570.

He received his education at Angers, concluding his study there in 1561.

In July 1573 he married Jeanne de Chasteigner, who brought with her to the marriage 48,000 livres. She was the widow of the ambassador Henri de Clutin and would commission Germain Pilon to build a funerary monument to her former husband in 1580.

Together they had a son Henri de Schomberg who would inherit his fathers offices and become a Marshal of France.

Schomberg purchased a hôtel on the rue Fromenteau in 1584. It had such a reputation for comfort that in 1596, Henri IV would purchase it from him for his mistress Gabrielle d'Estrées.

== Reign of Charles IX ==
=== Early career ===
In the first civil war that broke out in 1562, Schomberg was aligned with the Protestant rebels, and was entrusted by the prince of Condé with recruiting mercenaries in the Empire. He excelled at this role and his skill was noticed by the king who desired to bring him over to the royal cause.

Soon thereafter, he was granted the position of commander of the German cavalry in the royal army.

During 1566, Schomberg travelled with the young Duke of Guise to participate in a crusade against the Ottomans in Magyarország.

=== Third civil war ===
In the third civil war Schomberg commanded a German reiter force that monitored the frontier through the winter of 1568 alongside forces under Aumale for the purpose of dissuading any attempts by the Protestants Dutch coreligionists under the prince of Orange from entering France in their favour. Orange was able to evade his watchers and united his forces with Protestant mercenaries under Zweibrücken.

After the surrender of Saint-Jean-d'Angély in December 1569, the royal army was disbanded, so that talks could take place between the crown and the rebels. The court moved to Angers as these negotiations got underway. Schomberg came court at Angers to ensure his troops received their pay. While staying at Angers, the young Anjou, brother and heir to the king participated in various tournaments. During one such tournament, Anjou engaged in combat with Schomberg, during which Schomberg dislocated his shoulder and he wounded Schomberg in the face.

Schomberg began his rise through the court shortly thereafter, receiving appointment as a gentilhomme de la chambre du roi in 1570 and then chambellan in 1571. At this time he was a member of the duke of Anjou's council that advised him on his policy.

With the Spanish Netherlands in rebellion, factions of the French court looked towards a plan for an invasion and partition of the territory during 1571. To this end Schomberg was dispatched in May to court various German princes, gauging their support for such an enterprise. By 1572 the risks of this project had become apparent and the crowns support for the Dutch rebels became covert, with a formal war against España off the table.

=== Massacre of Saint Bartholomew ===
In the wake of the Massacre of Saint Bartholomew, Schomberg was again given a diplomatic mission to undertake in the Empire. As an experienced diplomat, he was tasked with soothing the furious anger of the various Protestant princes of the empire to the killing of their co-religionists across France. Schomberg delivered to the princes he visited the royal narrative that the crown had simply engaged in an extraordinary punishment for some rebels, and that this had no impact on the position of Protestantism in France. Admiral Coligny, he said, had been killed because of his 'conspiracy against the crown', not due to his religious disposition. He reported to the court about the hatred that was felt for Charles IX across Deutschland for 'ordering' the killings. Alongside this mission he was also instructed to resume his efforts to find covert support for the Dutch rebels, finding interest from the Erzbischof von Köln.

=== Conseiller d'État ===
In January 1573 Schomberg received further honours, first through his induction as a chevalier de l'Ordre de Saint-Michel, the highest chivalric order in France. He was then made a conseiller d'État in December, giving him a place in state policy.

Back in France in 1573, Schomberg was with Anjou when word arrived that he had been elected as king of the Commonwealth. As Anjou prepared to travel to his new kingdom, Schomberg travelled out in front of him to the various German princes on route to Kraków to prepare them for Anjou's stay during the travel. Throughout this process Schomberg was in correspondence with Retz, who was at this time close with Anjou. Alongside this responsibility, Schomberg was also to make sure no reiters, who had not been paid by the crown of France, were in the path of their journey. Schomberg would be a member of the king's household during his brief reign in the Commonwealth.

== Reign of Henri III ==
=== Fifth war of religion ===
In June 1575, Schomberg was dispatched into the Empire to gauge the intentions and disposition of the rebel prince of Condé. Schomberg quickly found a network of princes in opposition to France, who had provided the prince with 8000 cavalry. He was back with the royal army on 10 October, where he fought at the royal victory of Dormans in command of the royal reiters. During the fifth war of religion mercenary German reiters were hired by both the Malcontent rebels and Henri III for the prosecution of the war. Reporting back on this, Schomberg was authorised to offer the duke of Zweibrücken the sum of 500,000 livres as a bribe against supporting the rebels against the crown. Zweibrűcken was uninterested in the bribe, and in December 1575 prepared to enter France alongside Condé. Schomberg reported on the progress of Protestant and Malcontent efforts to hire mercenaries from the Empire in January 1576. He informed Bellièvre, who had been dispatched by the king to Lorraine that within five weeks the levies would be ready to enter France.

With the Peace of Monsieur, the reiters of both sides were to be paid by the crown, and encouraged to leave France. The royal reiters were under the command of Schomberg, however the money to pay them off was slow in arriving and he was unable to control the increasingly irate troops. As they were passing by Châlons in Champagne the reiters got into a confrontation with an anxious delegation from the city during which around 30 reiters were killed. After this the reiters continued their departure from France, while Henri fumed at Châlons for the confrontation.

When the peace was broken off, Schomberg was again sent into the Empire on a recruitment drive, with 100,000 livres to recruit reiters.

=== Count of Nanteuil-le-Haudoin ===
Schomberg was able to take advantage of the poor financial state that the duke of Guise was in by the late 1570s. When he was forced to liquidate his possession of the county of Nanteuil-le-Haudoin, Schomberg stepped in to purchase the seigneurie for 380,000 livres. Henri had hoped to acquire the county himself, but lacked the ready cash that Schomberg possessed.

During 1581, Schomberg conducted negotiations with the duke of Zweibrücken for the release of French hostages that had been secured by the duke at the time of the Peace of Monsieur. He offered Zweibrücken an annuity in exchange for them.

=== War with the ligue ===
In June 1584, the heir to the throne, the king's brother Alençon died. The duke of Guise re-founded the Catholic ligue to oppose the succession of the king's distant cousin Navarre. By early 1585 the ligue was ready to make war on Henri over the succession. The ligue hired mercenaries from inside the Empire, in response to which Henri tasked Schomberg with recruiting reiters for the royalist cause. The brief war that followed went poorly for the crown, with many cities rallying to the ligue. He was not however able to attain access to the Empire to acquire mercenaries, as Guise occupied the border cities of Toul and Verdun blocking his departure. Henri's mother Catherine was tasked with negotiating with the ligue, she dispatched Schomberg alongside the archbishop of Lyon to prepare for negotiations in June. After the Treaty of Nemours brings the ligue and crown into uneasy alliance. Schomberg was tasked by the king with reconciling the duke of Guise with the royal favourite Épernon. Unfortunately for the king Schomberg also hated Épernon, so for the performance of this mission he had to be granted two gifts of 4000 écus.

After the humiliation of the Day of the Barricades, Henri prepared for an Estates General in which he could reassert his control over his kingdom. As part of the preparations for this showdown with the ligue he dismissed all his ministers and brought in new faces. Schomberg consoled the dismissed surintendant des finances Bellièvre that his dismissal was surely temporary, and that Henri would recall the men when it was politically practical.

=== Two kings ===
Now at war with the ligue after the assassination of the duke of Guise, royalist Parlementaires were expelled from Paris. Henri therefore established at Tours a royalist Parlement in exile in opposition to the ligueur Paris Parlement. He opened the first session on 23 March 1589 with a lit de justice. Present for the opening of the new Parlement were many of his favourites and allies, among them Schomberg.

Henri was aware his control of the kingdom was increasingly shaky. He therefore decided to enter alliance with his Protestant cousin Navarre, who the ligue had previously compelled him to fight. The alliance between the two was established discreetly, with Schomberg and the archbishop of Bourges negotiating for Henri, while Duplessis-Mornay negotiated for Navarre. Their talks would bear fruit, and the two kings would enter alliance against the ligue to reconquer Paris. On 3 April Schomberg signed the treaty for the king.

With this arrangement agreed, Schomberg was dispatched across the Imperial border alongside De Thou to acquire a large mercenary force of 20,000 men.

== Reign of Henri IV ==
=== Loyalist ===
On 1 August 1589, Henri III was assassinated by Jacques Clément as he prepared to besiege Paris. Navarre became the royalist king, assuming the name Henri IV. Schomberg was among those loyal to Henri III who accepted serving a Protestant king during August 1589, alongside Marshal Biron and the duke of Longueville.

At the Battle of Ivry between royalist forces under Henri IV and ligueurs under the duke of Mayenne, Schomberg fought with Henri. Schomberg commanded forces on Henri's right flank, who faced off against the chevalier d'Aumale a cousin of the deceased duke of Guise and a detachment of Walloons. The royalist reserves under Biron would commit to supporting the right flank, and eventually triumph over Aumale. Meanwhile, Mayenne was bested by Henri in the centre and forced to abandon the field in a decisive royalist victory.

=== Estates General of 1593 ===
With the death of their candidate for king, the Catholic ligue held its own Estates General in 1593 to elect a new king. Henri and the royalists did not recognise their Estates General. Henri recognised the risk though of allowing the deliberations to continue without involving himself in them, and as such he arranged for a conference between members of the ligueur Estates and his own partisans. At Suresnes the two sides met in April for discussions. Representing Henri were the archbishop of Bourges, the seigneur de Rambouillet, the governor of Saint-Denis, several former secretaries of Henri III and Schomberg. The assembled delegates would successfully arrange what was at first a ten-day truce between the royalists and the ligue but would in fact last until 1594.

=== Paris ===
By 1594 the position of the ligue was increasingly dire. Henri who had twice been rebuffed outside Paris made plans to gain the city for the royalist cause. The newly appointed ligueur governor Marshal Brissac had been selected by Mayenne due to his impeccable ligueur credentials, however he responded positively to royalist entreaties from Schomberg, Bellièvre and de Thou.

François d'O held the position of surintendant des finances from 1588 until his death in 1594. With his death, Henri decided to re-establish the conseil des finances to oversee the kingdoms finances. The council was composed of four sword nobles, Nevers, Retz, Damville and Schomberg, alongside several secretaries of state and administrative experts. Together the body undertook every financial expedient in the book to raise money, from loans to establishing new titles to the establishment of new taxes without consultation.

=== Protestant malcontents ===
By 1597 Schomberg had been established as the governor of La Marche. Henri had by this time alienated many of his former Protestant co-religionists, and the Malcontent Protestant nobility met at Saumur. In March of that year, word came that the key city of Amiens had fallen to the Spanish. Schomberg, alongside de Thou arrived at the meeting, and urged the nobles present to come to the aid of their king. The group proved too deep in their resentment of the king for the commissioners to mobilise. Upon returning to the king, Henri lamented to him the dire state of the kingdom, but decided not to yield to the Protestant nobles demands. He would however send the commissioners back one more time for another negotiation. The Protestant nobles were fractured, with some contemplating war against Henri by this time. Schomberg arrived alone at the assembly, and succeeded in defusing some of the anger through the acceptance of a number of articles which would constitute the future Edict of Nantes in an agreement established on 25 July 1597. This accomplished the notables present agreed to join Schomberg and the king at the siege of Amiens, however they would not do so. Despite the lack of assistance from the Protestant lords, Henri received the submission of Amiens in September.

=== Edict of Nantes and death ===
The landmark Edict of Nantes in 1598 which granted limited toleration to Protestantism was bitterly resisted by elements of the Catholic elite. As a member of the king's council Schomberg was tasked with forwarding the Edict to the Paris Parlement for registration. The Parlement was unhappy that the Edict allowed Protestant participation in provincial Estates and high offices of state. Schomberg argued that Protestants had demonstrated themselves to be loyal servants of the king, he was supported in this argument by the Chancellor Cheverny and Constable Montmorency. Schomberg was by 1598, one of Henri's three principle ministers, alongside Bellièvre and Sancy.

While returning from Conflans on 17 March 1599, Schomberg was stricken with apoplexy and died. He had been working towards the implementation of the Edict of Nantes.

== Sources ==
- Babelon, Jean-Pierre (2009). Henri IV. Fayard.
- Chevallier, Pierre (1985). Henri III: Roi Shakespearien. Fayard.
- Cloulas, Ivan (1979). Catherine de Médicis. Fayard.
- Constant, Jean-Marie (1984). Les Guise. Hachette.
- Constant, Jean-Marie (1996). La Ligue. Fayard.
- Fraustadt, Albert (1869). Geschichte des Geschlechtes von Schonberg Meissnischen Stammes. Salzwasser-Verlag GmbH.
- Holt, Mack (2002). The Duke of Anjou and the Politique Struggle During the Wars of Religion. Cambridge University Press.
- Jouanna, Arlette (1998). Histoire et Dictionnaire des Guerres de Religion. Bouquins.
- Jouanna, Arlette (2013). The St Bartholomew's Day Massacre: The Mysteries of a Crime of State. Manchester University Press.
- Knecht, Robert (2010). The French Wars of Religion, 1559-1598. Routledge.
- Knecht, Robert (2014). Catherine de' Medici. Routledge.
- Knecht, Robert (2016). Hero or Tyrant? Henry III, King of France, 1574-1589. Routledge.
- Konnert, Mark (1997). Civic Agendas & Religious Passion: Châlon-sur-Marne during the French Wars of Religion 1560-1594. Sixteenth Century Journal Publishers Inc.
- Konnert, Mark (2006). Local Politics in the French Wars of Religion: The Towns of Champagne, the Duc de Guise and the Catholic League 1560-1595. Ashgate.
- Pitts, Vincent (2012). Henri IV of France: His Reign and Age. Johns Hopkins University Press.
- Le Roux, Nicolas (2000). La Faveur du Roi: Mignons et Courtisans au Temps des Derniers Valois. Champ Vallon.
- Le Roux, Nicolas (2006). Un Régicide au nom de Dieu: L'Assassinat d'Henri III. Gallimard.
- Salmon, J.H.M (1979). Society in Crisis: France during the Sixteenth Century. Metheun & Co.
- Sutherland, Nicola (1980). The Huguenot Struggle for Recognition. Yale University Press.
- Thompson, James (1909). The Wars of Religion in France 1559-1576: The Huguenots, Catherine de Medici and Philip II. Chicago University Press.
