= Jacques Davy Duperron =

French politician and cardinal (1556–1618)

His Eminence Jacques Davy Duperron
- Archbishop of Sens; Grand Almoner of France
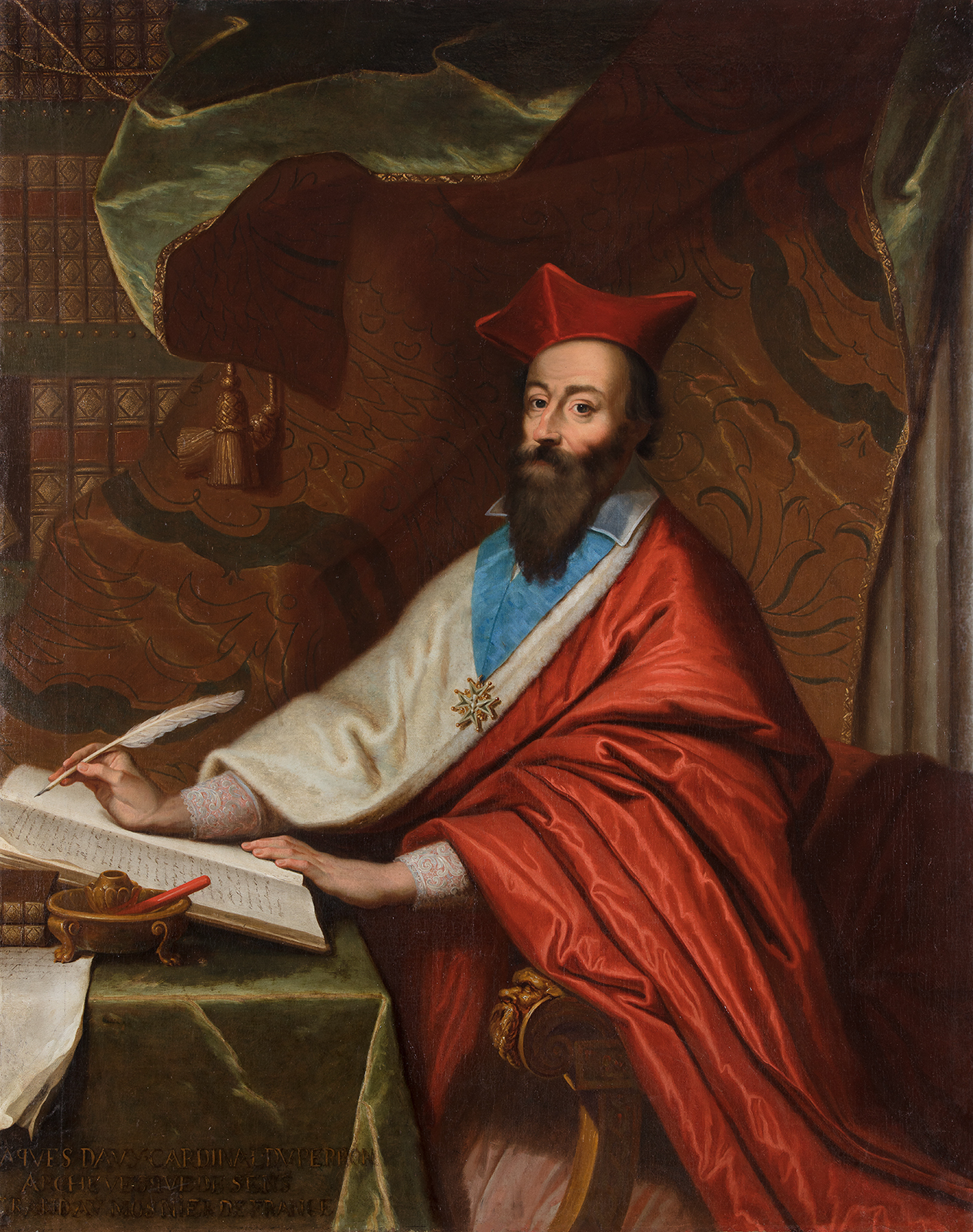
- Portrait of Cardinal Duperron, 17th century
- Church: Catholic Church
- Archdiocese: Sens
- Appointed: 9 October 1606
- Term ended: 6 December 1618
- Predecessor: Renaud de Beaune
- Successor: Jean Davy du Perron
- Previous posts: Bishop of Évreux (1591–1606)

Orders
- Consecration: 27 December 1595 by François de Joyeuse
- Created cardinal: 9 June 1604 by Pope Clement VIII
- Rank: Cardinal-Priest

Personal details
- Born: 15 November 1556 Saint-Lô, Normandy
- Died: 6 December 1618 (aged 62) Paris, France
- Buried: Sens Cathedral
- Coat of arms

Jacques Davy Duperron (French pronunciation: [ʒak davi dypɛʁɔ̃]; 15 November 1556 – 6 December 1618) was a French politician and Roman Catholic Cardinal.

== Family and Education ==
Jacques Davy du Perron was born in Saint-Lô in Normandy, into the Davy family, which belonged to the Norman minor nobility, in the branch "Davy du Perron" named after a property near St. Lô (in French his name is spelled Jacques Davy du Perron). He is never referred to as "Davy", and he usually signs his documents "Du Perron". The spelling "Duperron" is almost certainly wrong.

His father Julien was a physician, who, on embracing the doctrines of the Reformation, became a Protestant minister; his mother was Ursine Le Cointe, daughter of Guillaume Le Cointe, sieur de Tot et d' Héranville en Cotentin. During the siege of Rouen in 1562 by the troops of King Charles IX, Julien was arrested and imprisoned in Old Palais in Rouen. Ursine and her two children escaped through the royal lines and eventually was reunited with her husband in Bas Normandie. To escape persecution the family settled at Bern, in Switzerland. There Jacques received his education, being taught Latin and mathematics by his father, and learning Greek and Hebrew and the philosophy then in vogue, Aristotelianism, as well as that of Thomas Aquinas and Saint Augustine of Hippo.

During the disorders following the St. Bartholomew's Day Massacre (23–24 August 1572 in Paris; a month later in Normandy) the family fled to the Island of Jersey, which was under Protestant English control.

== Career under Henry III ==
Returning to Normandy, du Perron's existence and his talents were drawn to the attention of a courtier who was visiting General Jacques of Matignon, the Governor of Normandy. This courtier, named Lancosme, took du Perron along with him when he returned to Blois, where the new King, Henry III of France, was residing. He was presented to the King one evening during dinner, where he acquitted himself well both in speaking and in answering questions posed by the King's attendants.

After he had abjured Protestantism, around 1578, he was again presented by Philippe Desportes, abbot of Tiron, as a young man without equal for knowledge and talent. He was appointed Reader to the King by Henry III [Lecteur de la chambre du Roy]. In 1578 he is also mentioned as Professeur du Roy aux langues, aux mathematiques, et en la philosophie. He was commanded to preach before the king at the convent of Vincennes (1585), when the success of his sermon on the love of God, and of a funeral oration on the poet Ronsard (on 24 February 1586, after dinner), induced him to take orders. On the death of Mary, Queen of Scots (8 February 1587), he was chosen by the King to compose a poem in her honor and about her fate.

== Career under Henry IV ==
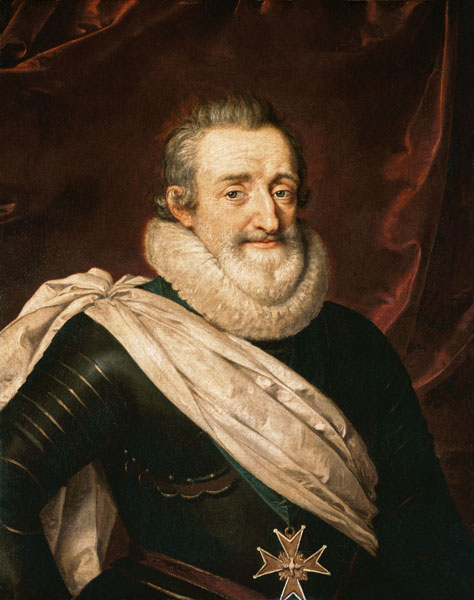
Du Perron served under King Henry IV of France during most of his ecclesiastical career.

On the death of Henry III (2 August 1589), after having supported for some time the cardinal de Bourbon, the head of the league against the king, Du Perron eventually became a faithful servant of Henry IV. On 13 February 1590, however, he found himself compelled to write directly to the King, begging him not to believe the many calumnies being spread about by his enemies. On 11 December 1591 du Perron was appointed by the King bishop of Évreux. The Pope finally approved of the appointment at a Consistory on Monday 11 December 1595. He was consecrated in Rome on 27 December 1595 by Cardinal François de Joyeuse; the co-consecrators were Archbishop Guillaume d'Avançon of Embrun and Anne d'Escars de Givry, bishop of Lisieux. On 4 November 1596 he was one of those who attended the Assemblée des Notables at Rouen. He and Marechal de Matignon represented Normandy in the Third Chamber.

He instructed Henry in the Catholic faith; and in 1594 was sent to Rome with secretary Denis-Simon de Marquemont, where with the help of Abbé Arnaud d'Ossat (1536–1604), (later Cardinal d'Ossat) they obtained Henry's absolution from the status of relapsed heretic. Du Perron and d'Ossat performed the act of abjuration of Henry's heresy on the steps of St. Peter's Basilica on 17 September 1595, thereby ending six years of controversy over the status of France and its King in the eyes of the Papacy. Du Perron departed Rome on 28 March 1596. On his return to his diocese, Du Perron's zeal and eloquence were largely instrumental in withstanding the progress of Calvinism, and among others he converted and the Swiss General Sancy and Henry Sponde, who became bishop of Pamiers. At the conference at Fontainebleau in 1600 he argued against Du Plessis Mornay (1549–1623).

== Cardinal du Perron ==
On 9 June 1604, du Perron was created a cardinal by Pope Clement VIII, at the request of King Henry IV. In a letter of 17 June 1604, King Henry IV was able to inform the Bishop that the Pope had indeed named him a cardinal. His red hat was bestowed personally by the King in a public assembly at Fontainebleau. His speech of thanks to the King on that occasion survives. He then set out for Rome to partake in the ceremonies of his elevation; he was sent to Rome, departing Fontainebleau on 29 October 1604 as chargé d'affaires de France. His instructions from Henry IV required him to hold conversations with the Duke of Savoy and the Duke of Tuscany along the way. He and the Grand Duke discussed, among other things, possible candidates for the Papacy in the next Conclave, most especially the great-grand nephew of Leo X, Cardinal Alessandro de' Medici, Archbishop of Florence and Bishop of Palestrina. Cardinal de'Medici was well known in the French Court, since he had been Legatus a latere in France between 1596 and 1598. Henry also sent along general instructions for the French Cardinals in Rome, anticipating a vacancy in the Papal throne. Cardinal du Perron made his solemn entry into Rome on 18 December. In the Consistory of 7 January 1605 he was named Cardinal Priest of S. Agnese in Agone, in Piazza Navona.

Immediately upon his appointment, Clement VIII found important work for du Perron in Rome. The Pope had formed a special commission, the Congregation de auxiliis, the chairmanship of which he retained for himself. But he appointed Cardinal du Perron to the Congregation. The purpose of this commission was to investigate and decide upon the work of the Jesuit theologian Luis de Molina, which had raised the acute question of God's Providence and human free will. Du Perron attended his first session on 21 January.

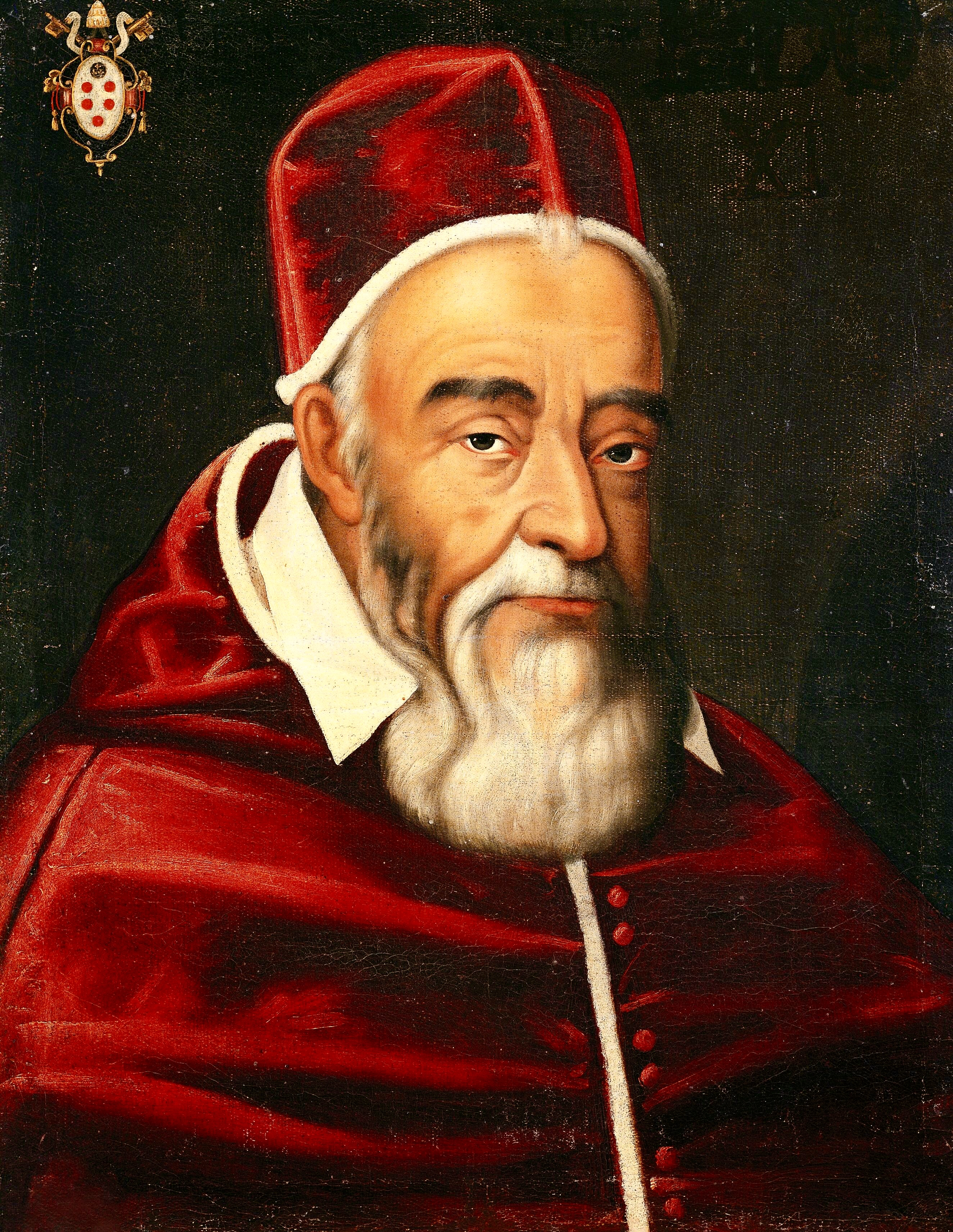
Pope Leo XI, whom du Perron helped elect into the Papal office in 1605.

When Clement VIII died on Thursday 3 March 1605, the Congregation was suspended, and du Perron found himself involved in his first Conclave. Although he was not the leader of the French faction, he contributed loyally, after the failure of the candidacies of Cardinals Baronius and Seraphin, to the election of the French King's candidate, Cardinal de' Medici, to the papal throne as Pope Leo XI. Du Perron sent a long letter to Henry IV, reporting the day-to-day movements inside the Conclave in great detail. On the death of Leo XI only twenty-four days later, du Perron participated in the election of Cardinal Camillo Borghese as Pope Paul V. At the conclusion of the Coronation festivities, Cardinal du Perron wrote a report of the Conclave for Henry IV.

After his election, Paul V decided to continue the Congregation de auxiliis, and therefore du Perron was one of the Judges who began meeting again on 14 September 1605. He complained in a letter to Henry IV that he was constrained to read everything that had been published on the question during the previous eight or nine years. Although he appeared to work well with the Jesuit Cardinal Robert Bellarmine, in presenting the positions of Molinism fairly, du Perron's repeated counsel was not to take any decisions on the basic issues of the matter. Du Perron, after all, had strong Augustinian tendencies, which tended to make Molina's positions uncongenial. Even when he had returned to France in 1607, the Jesuits kept attempting to draw him into their circle, but without success.

However, while du Perron was still in Rome, Pope Paul V decided to pick a quarrel with the Republic of Venice, over its conduct in exercising what it considered to be its sovereign rights. The Venetian government had passed a law against alienation of property in favor of the Church, and another requiring governmental approval for the building of new churches. In addition, there sprung up again an argument over the exemption of the clergy from civil court jurisdiction. On 17 April 1606 Pope Paul launched a papal bull against Venice, imposing an interdict on all the territories belonging to the Republic. It was believed that this conflict would lead to war, and that such a war would excite Spanish involvement for territory in Lombardy. Henry IV, wishing to prevent this, proposed mediation between the Pope and Venice, and offered Cardinal de Joyeuse and Cardinal du Perron as mediators. The status of the Jesuits, who supported the papal interdict, became the main stumbling block to an agreement; the Venetians wanted the Jesuits gone. Finally, due to the forceful persuasion of Cardinal de Joyeuse (du Perron claimed to be ill), the Pope gave way, the edict was withdrawn, and the crisis averted. Nonetheless, for the work that he had done, the Republic offered du Perron its thanks.

In 1606, while still in Rome, du Perron was appointed archbishop of Sens by the King, an act approved by Pope Paul V in Consistory on 9 October 1606. Like his predecessor at Sens, he became Primate of the Gauls and Germany, and Grand Almoner of the King of France (which also made him President of the Bibliothèque du Roi, which at that time was located at Fontainebleau). He was also ex officio the director of the College Royal. The King also appointed him Commander of the Order of the Holy Spirit. Du Perron began his return to France in the Autumn of 1607. He was received by the Grand Duke of Tuscany in Florence, who wrote to King Henry in praise of du Perron on 21 September. He visited Cardinal Giustiniani in Bologna, and then went to Venice, from which he wrote to the King on 5 October. He then passed on toward France by way of Milan. After his return from Rome, he was present continually at the Royal Court for more than a year. He did not take possession of his throne in the Cathedral of Sens until 26 October 1608. After the death of Henry IV in 1610, he took an active part in the Estates General of 1614, when he vigorously upheld the ultramontane doctrines against the Third Estate. His speech against an oath to the French crown, proposed at this Estates General, much like the English Oath of Allegiance, was printed in French and later translated into English. These publications occasioned a response from King James VI and I, to which the Cardinal replied (again, originally in French, with a later English translation).

He died on Wednesday 5 September 1618, at the age of 63. His viscera were entombed in the Jesuit Church of Saint-Louis in Paris, while his body was buried in the Choir of his cathedral in Sens.

== Bibliography ==
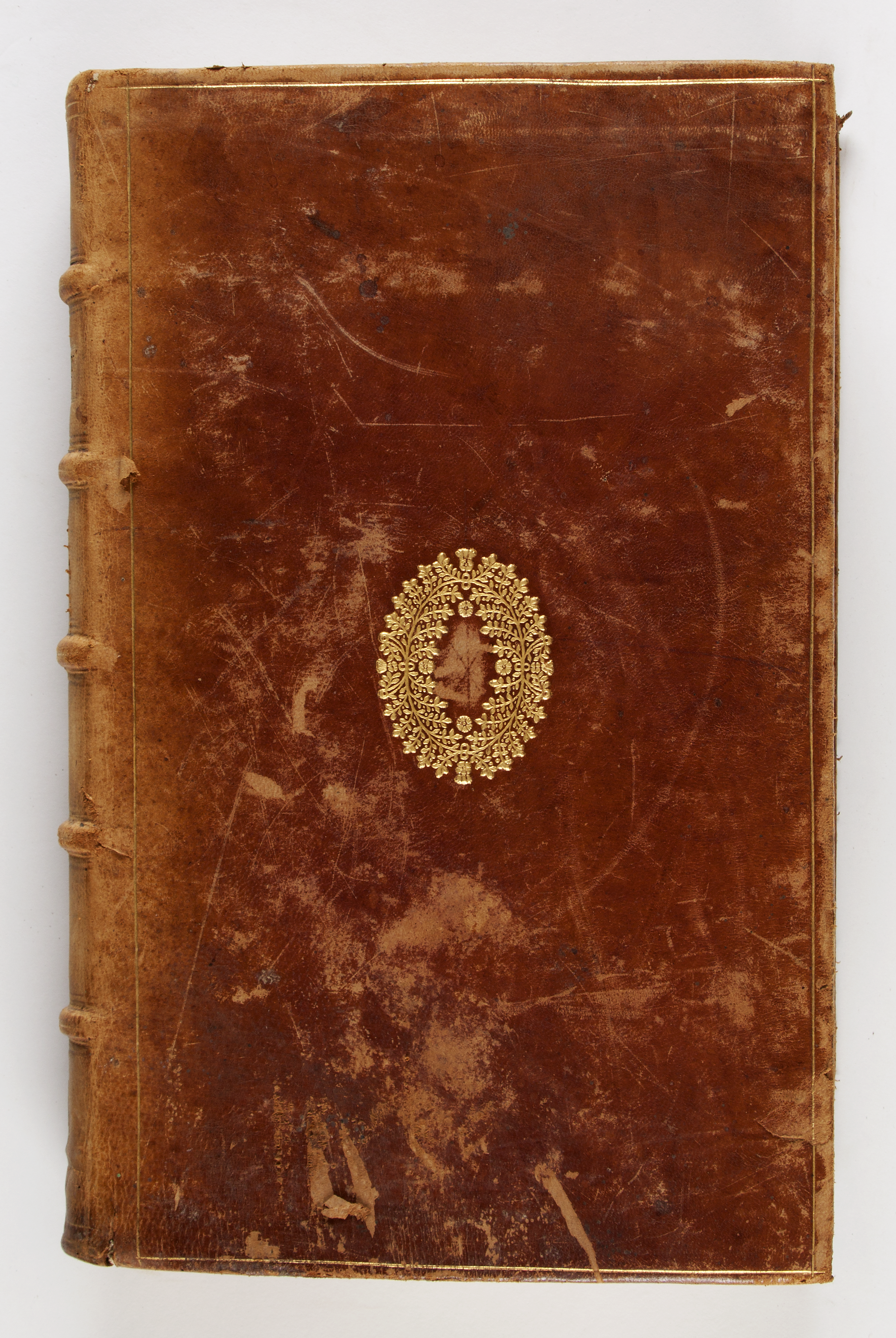
Les ambassades et negotiations de L' Illustrisime et Reverendissime Cardinal du Perron - Skoklosters slott

- Les Diverses Œuvres de l'illustrissime cardinal Du Perron (Paris, 1622) (second edition, augmented, Paris: Antoine Estiene, 1629).
- César de Ligny, Les ambassades et negotiations de L' Illustrisime et Reverendissime Cardinal du Perron (Paris: Pierre Lamy 1633).
- Jean-Lévesque de Burigny, Vie du Cardinal du Perron, Archevêque de Sens et Grand-Aumônier de France (Paris: De Bure 1768).
- Pierre Feret, Le Cardinal Du Perron (Paris, 1876).
- Rev. Charles Albert Dubray, "Jacques-Davy Duperron," The Catholic Encyclopedia (New York: Robert Appleton, 1909), vol. 5, newadvent.org.
