= Estates General of 1593 =

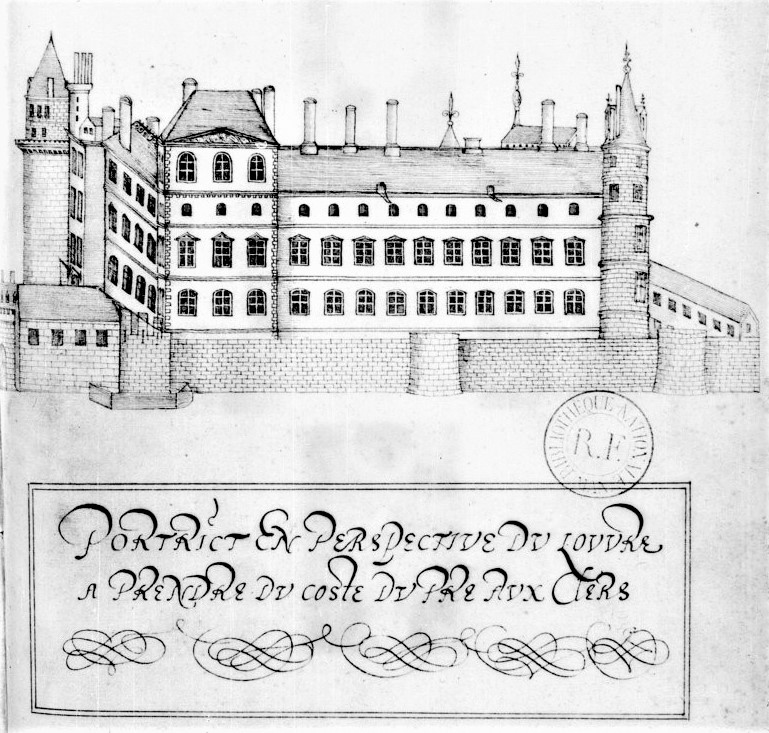
1580s Engraving of the Louvre palace at which the Estates met

The Estates General of 1593 was a national meeting of the three orders of France that met from January to August 1593. Unlike any other Estates General of France, it was convoked without the authority of a king, at the behest of duke of Mayenne, lieutenant-general of the kingdom for the rebel Catholic ligue (league) movement, which controlled Paris and many other cities. The Catholic ligue had reformed in 1584 to oppose the succession to the throne of the Protestant king of Navarre. They proposed the candidacy of Cardinal Bourbon, Navarre's Catholic uncle. In 1589, the king died, and while royalists recognised Navarre as Henri IV, ligueur (leaguer) controlled areas instead recognised Bourbon as Charles X. In 1590, Bourbon died, leaving the ligue without a king. Many ligueur nobles were happy without a king, but pressure was brought to bear on Mayenne, and by late 1592 he agreed to convoke an Estates General to elect a new one. This Estates would not be recognised by Henri.

The Estates assembled from the limited areas the ligue controlled in January 1593, their arrival impeded by the forces of Henri. He did however recognise the danger in their electing a king, and therefore reached out to entreat with the Estates, a prospect which was agreed to over the objections of radical members of the Estates. The resulting conference at Suresnes on 27 April produced a short truce, and the occasion of Henri's announcement of his planned conversion to Catholicism in mid May. Meanwhile, at the Estates, the Spanish allies of the ligue sought to impose the king of Spain's daughter known as the Infanta as the queen of France, proposing first the Austrian Archduke Ernst, and when this was received poorly proposing instead a French prince, the duke of Guise. To aid their project they attempted to distribute bribes, but these were poorly received. The Spanish proposals aroused the displeasure of the legal-minded members of the Estates, who walked out in June in protest. The Parlement (highest court of France) of Paris subsequently declared that Salic Law (succession through the male line) was inviable, and foreign princes were illegible for the French throne. By now the momentum was against the Spanish, and even with the ambassador proposing French princes, neither the Second or Third Estate felt they had the authority to elect a king. The Estates' final business would be to ratify the adoption of the Tridentine Decrees, with its final meeting on 8 August before it was prorogued by Mayenne.

== Kingdom without a king ==
=== Catholic Ligue ===
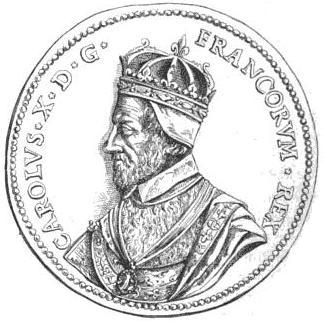
Medal featuring Cardinal Bourbon as king Charles X of France

In July 1584 king Henri III's brother Alençon died, leaving the king's distant Protestant cousin the king of Navarre as heir to the throne. This was seized upon as unacceptable by a certain segment of the Catholic nobility, led by the duke of Guise who reformed the Catholic ligue (league) to oppose his succession. The Catholic ligue settled on Navarre's Catholic uncle Cardinal Bourbon as their candidate to succeed Henri. Bourbon was an aged man, and has been considered a 'stopgap' candidate for the throne. In 1589 Henri was assassinated and the ligue declared Bourbon the king as Charles X (though he was in the captivity of Navarre, who now styled himself Henri IV). Bourbon would however die before being released from captivity on 9 May 1590, leaving the ligue without a king to oppose Henri.

=== Candidates ===
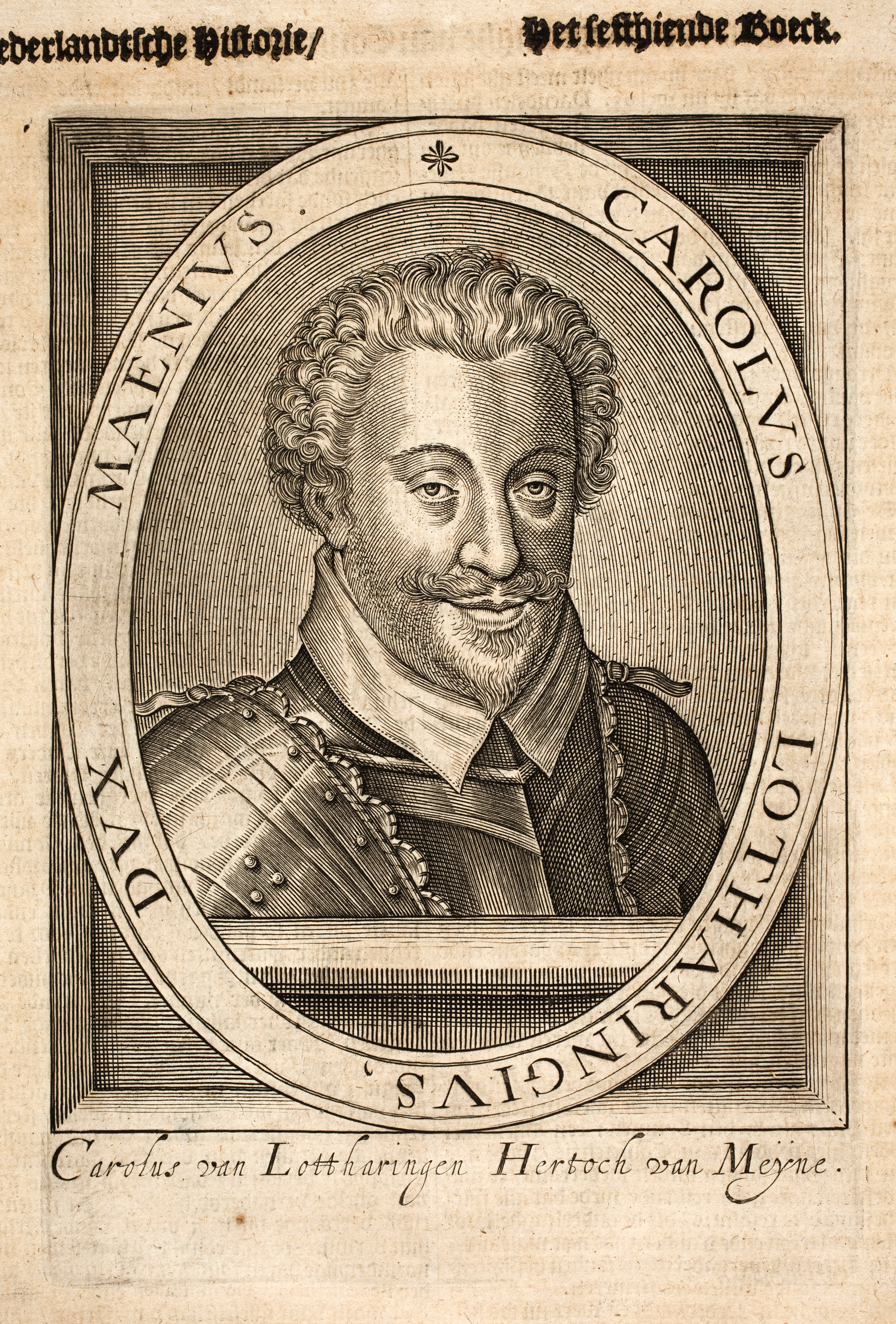
Engraving of the duke of Mayenne

Among many elements of the ligue, attentions therefore turned to the prospect of an Estates General to select a new king. There were many candidates that recommended themselves to factions of the ligue. the lieutenant-general of the kingdom for the ligue the duke of Mayenne favoured himself for the role, while his nephew the young duke of Guise was popular among Parisian ligueurs (leaguers). Many ligueur nobles were entirely uninterested in who was king, happy with any candidate who would possess weak central authority that could not impede on their fiefdom building in the civil war-wracked provinces.

A small radical faction of the ligue was open to the possibility of being ruled by a foreign prince, Philip II of Spain or a relative of his being the top candidates. The Spanish were naturally keen on this arrangement, and pushed for the candidacy of Philip's daughter with his wife Elisabeth de Valois, the Infanta.

The leading ligueur theorists argued that a king could only have the right to rule if they followed the correct laws and other prerequisites. Therefore, in the absence of such a candidate presently, it was the duty of the Estates and the Pope to solve the problem by electing a king.

== Plans for convocation ==
=== Abortive efforts ===
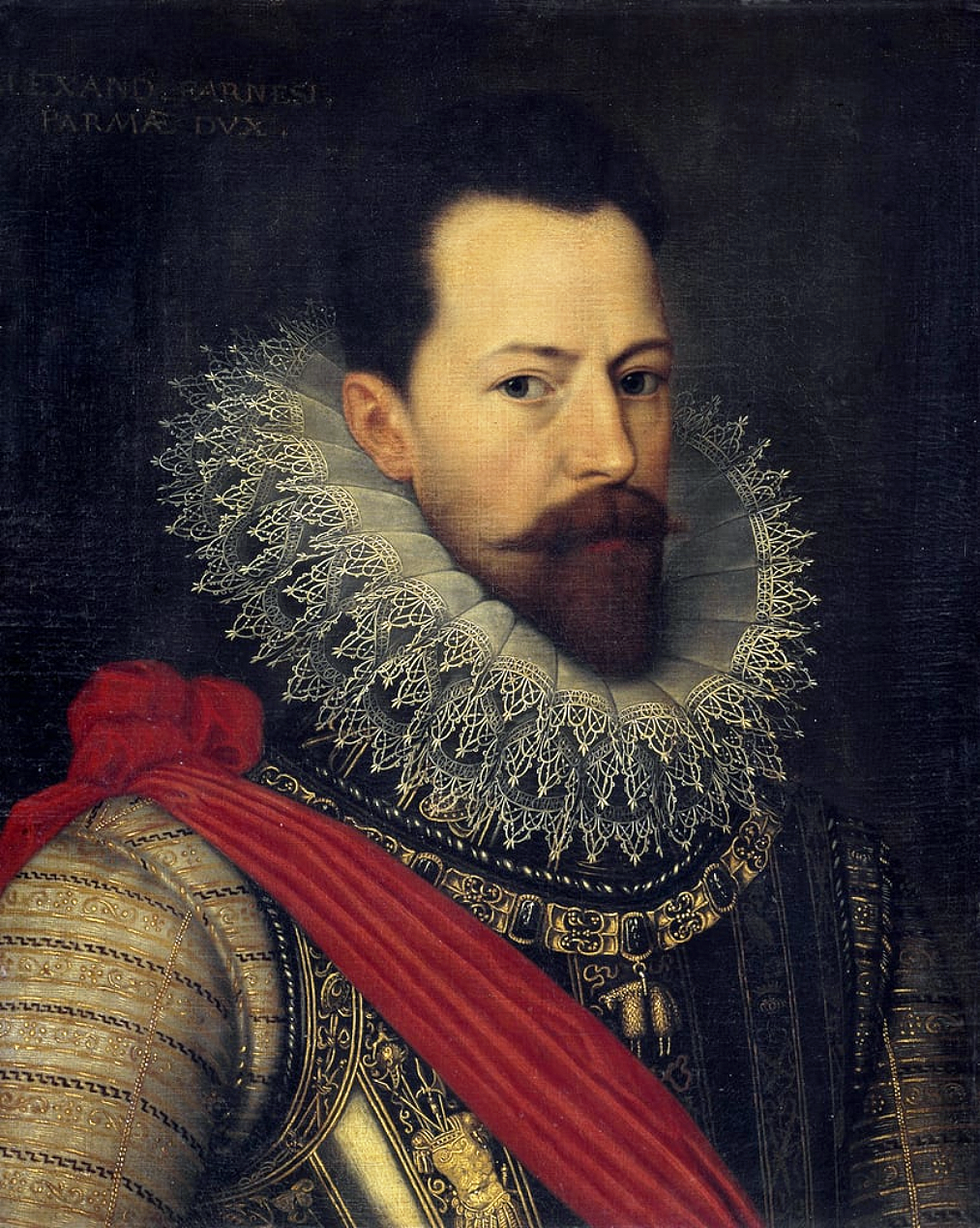
Spanish governor of Nederland, the duke of Parma

There had been desires in the ligueur camp for the convoking of an Estates General since at least 1591 when it had been first planned for one to meet. Mayenne made several abortive plans during this period for Estates, proposing variously Paris, Melun and Orléans to host them, but always cancelling them before the plans could advance significantly. In June 1592 summons had even gone out for the hosting of an Estates, to be held at Reims, with some elections held and even a couple of delegates arriving in the city before Mayenne decided to cancel it. He reasoned that it was too close to the border with the Spanish Nederland and therefore the Spanish commander the duca di Parma would be able to easily impose himself on it by force of arms. Spain, keen to see an arrangement involving the Infanta endorsed by the ligue pushed Mayenne to convoke it. An exchange is reported involving Mayenne and the ligueur mayor of Paris in November of that year, in which Mayenne frustratedly asked La Chapelle Marteau what the people wanted, and the mayor replied that they desired a king.

Mayenne was also under pressure from the Parlement which urged Mayenne to seek Henri's conversion so that he could become their king, and if he would not convert to proceed with the election of an alternate king. Mayenne rebuffed the Parlement, arguing that conversion was not sufficient for Henri to have a right to the throne, and that Papal approval was also required. He therefore reluctantly conceded to the alternate proposal (and that of the Spanish) to convoke the Estates. To this end in the Autumn of 1592 he gave permission for elections to take place. In December of that year, Mayenne invited the Catholic princes who had rallied to Henri to attend the Estates, as observers. He was relieved also, to learn of the death of Parma, which he felt made the chance that Spain would dominate the Estates, less likely.

=== Election of the deputies ===
The local ligue councils distributed across France operated largely independently of Paris in the conduct of their affairs. An exception to this arrangement was made for the selection of delegates for the Estates General, which was instead centrally directed from Paris.

Deputies were mainly dispatched to the Estates from regions in which the ligue held secure authority. Therefore, from Guyenne only in Poitou and Périgueux could ligueur deputies be brought to the capital. By contrast in Champagne Troyes, Chaumont, Sens, Meaux and Mézières provided deputies.

Henri was vigorously campaigning against the ligue in early 1593, the duke of Bouillon was campaigning for him in Champagne, the duke of Nevers was occupying Beauce and Jean VI d'Aumont had been tasked with entering Bretagne to combat the ligueur duke of Mercœur. It was in this difficult circumstance that the deputies had to travel to the capital.

Alongside the physical impediments to be found on the road, many potential deputies were also dissuaded from attending to the technically illegal nature of the Estates, which had not been convoked by a legitimate king.

The prospective deputies would find many of their roads blocked in their attempts to make it to Paris. To combat this they took to disguising themselves, in hopes of slipping past royalist blockades. Despite this, many would face arrest by royal soldiers, alongside other merchants who happened to be passing in the direction of Paris.

In Bourgogne, one of Mayenne's chief clients from Dijon, Étienne Bernard would be selected as a delegate for the Estates. To ensure the Dijon delegation could reach Paris, Jean de Saulx would be entrusted with providing them an armed escort. Ligueur clergy prayed for the safety of the delegates on the road to Paris.

=== Turnout ===
In total 128 deputies would make it to Paris for the 1593 Estates, a far lower turnout than 1588 when the nobility alone had provided 180 deputies. In total the prior two Estates had each reached around 400 deputies. These deputies would break down as follows: 49 members of the First Estate (clergy), 24 members of the Second Estate (nobility) and 55 members of the Third Estate (commons). The particularly weak showing from the nobility, demonstrates their hesitance by this period to associate with the ligue. The provinces were represented unevenly: 24% of the deputies were from the Île de France, Bourgogne provided 16%, the Orléanais 12%, Champagne 11% and Normandie 10%. Only 2% of the deputies were from regions such as Guyenne, Dauphiné and Bretagne.

=== Estate composition ===
Of the deputies elected for the First Estate, there would be 13 bishops, among whom three were recent appointees to their bishopric by Mayenne. Pellevé, the archbishop of Reims and Épinac, the archbishop of Lyon were elected as présidents of the Estate. The First Estate delegation from Paris was particularly hardline ligueur in view.

Among the Second Estate deputies was the ligueur governor of Orléans, Claude de La Châtre.

The Third Estate deputies were divided between Parlementaires such as Du Vair, Le Maistre, and Masparault, and ligueur Parisians from the Seize who had originally planned to be in attendance at the 1591 Estates, such as Neuilly, Dorléans and Roland. The Parlementaires of Paris were significantly more politique in inclination. Therefore, in contrast to the Estates of 1588, it would be Paris that was overall a moderating influence on the more radical deputies from the provinces.

=== Cahiers ===
Before arriving in the capital, the deputies drew up their lists of grievances that they wished to be addressed by the Estates, known as cahiers. Of these only a handful survive, three for the Third Estate (Troyes, Reims and Rouen) and only one for the First Estate (Auxerre).

The sole surviving cahiers belong to the First Estate comes from Auxerre. In their cahiers, they argued that both Spain and the Papacy would give their approval to the correct candidate to be made king, and that Spain would provide the king's daughter, known as the Infanta to marry to the chosen man. Salic Law, they argued, was to be temporarily suspended for the purposes of the moment, but would be reinstated when the crisis had passed.

The cahiers for both Reims and Rouen both stressed the importance that a Catholic king be elected. Reims continued that the noble governors of provinces be restricted in their purview so that they had no authority over fiscal and judicial matters. Moreover, venal office was to be suppressed and any offices created by the hated Henri III abolished. The cahiers of Rouen argued that the traditional liberties of Rouen, must be preserved by the new king. Reims and Troyes both made sure to mention that the Catholic king would be French. Those of Troyes combined the importance that Henri be discounted as king (even if he converted), with the need for financial and administrative reform. Henri's Catholic relations were also to be excluded. They proposed that each province dispatch several commissioners who would be allowed to sit on the royal council, and that all new taxes established since the reign of Louis XII be revoked and going forward any new tax would need to be signed off on by the Estates.

All cahiers took it as a given that Protestantism would be extirpated in France.

Of the cahiers that we lack a record of, the diary of Pierre de l'Estoile offers a hint at what they contained. He speaks of deputies from Orléans concerned for the resumption of trade on the Loire. According to L'Estoile this was also a matter of concern for those of Amiens and Abbeville. These deputies desired an audience with Mayenne to discuss their concerns, but were unable to attain it.

== In session ==
=== Opening address ===
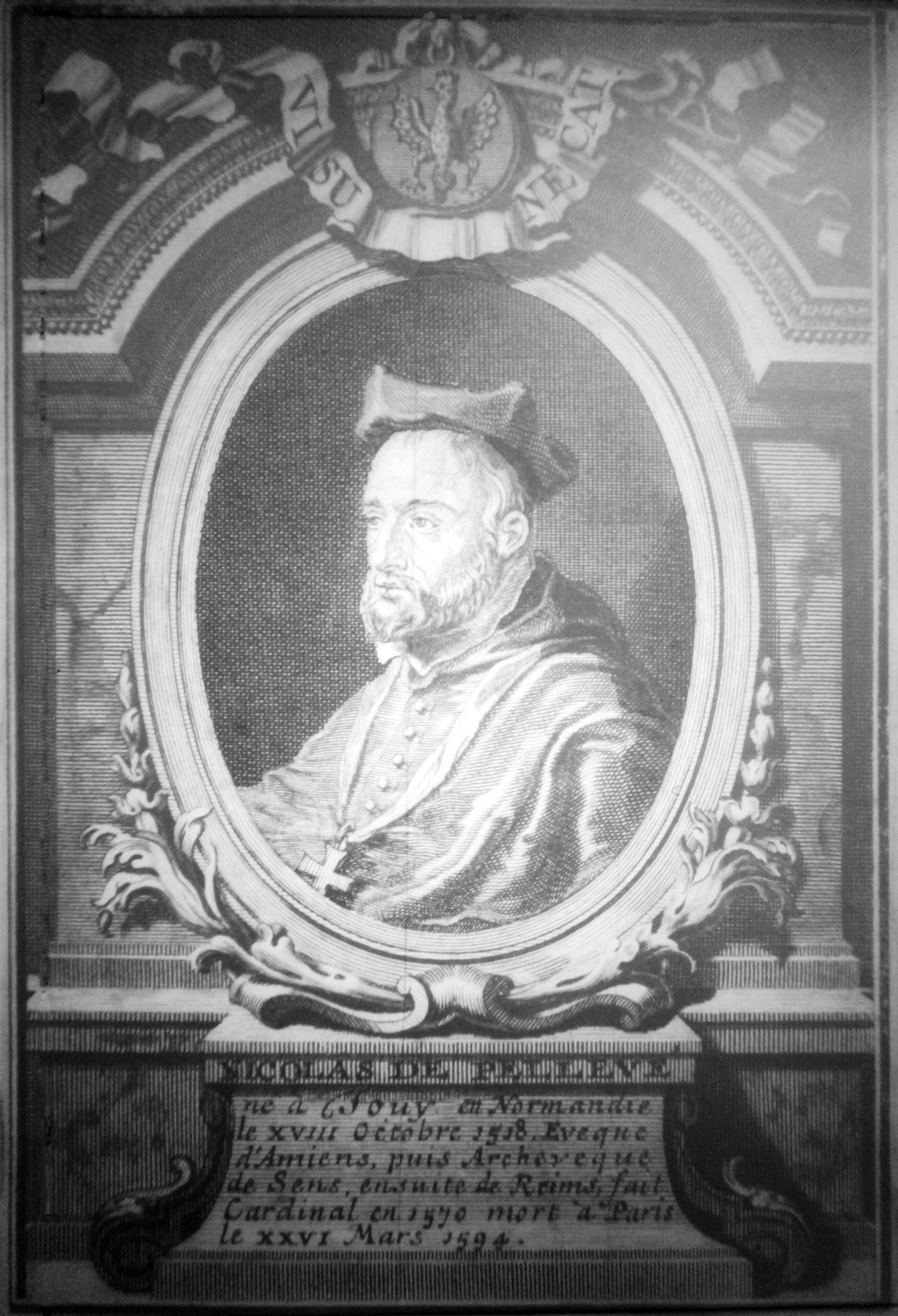
Cardinal Pellevé

On 26 January the Estates were opened at the Louvre in the salle des États. The location was symbolic, adjacent to the vacant king's apartments on the first floor of the building. Mayenne gave the opening address of the Estates, stressing the importance of establishing a Catholic king for France. He praised the ligue for the work they had done to save France since 1588 and announced his willingness to lay down his life in protection of the Catholic religion and state. Mayenne was not a gifted orator, and his muttered address was barely heard by the assembled delegates. His speech was followed by one given by Cardinal Pellevé who argued in support of Philip, greatly alienating a considerable portion of the assembled delegates.

In attendance alongside the delegates was the Papal Legate the Cardianl de Piacenza, and a Spanish delegation. The Papal Legate struggled to get his credentials as 'protector of the kingdom' recognised, and therefore was not able to participate in the opening debate and had to join several days later. Only half of the delegates themselves had yet arrived, due to the problems on the roads, and therefore business proper would not get going until 4 February.

=== Spanish campaign ===
In March, the new Spanish commander the count of Mansfeld entered the Paris region, marching on the royalist held Noyon, a town near Paris and seizing it on 30 March. Philip envisioned that Mansfeld's proximate presence to the Estates would encourage them towards adopting the correct candidate for the throne.

=== Spanish speech ===
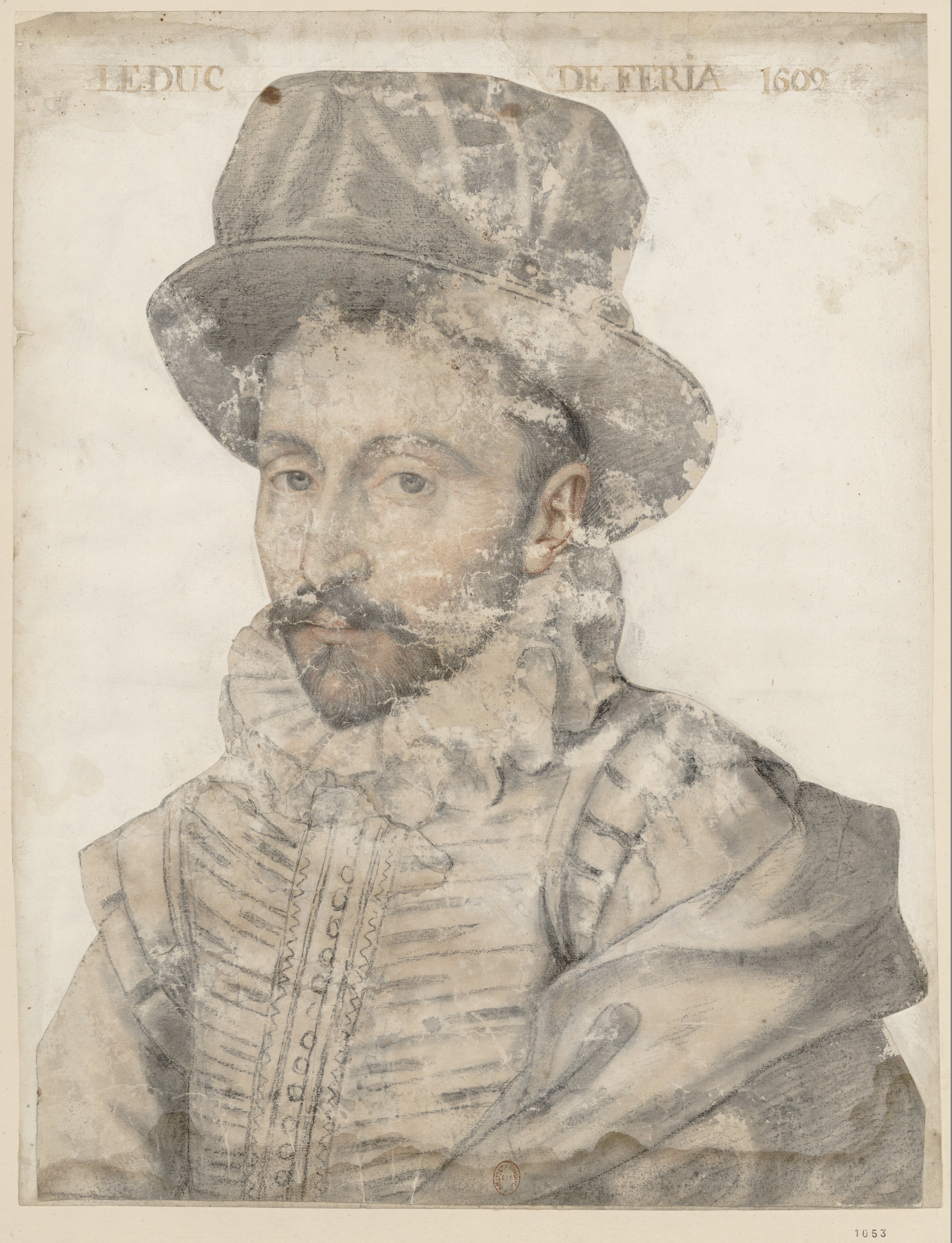
Ambassador of Spain, the duke of Feria

On 2 April the Spanish ambassador, the duke of Feria, presented their credentials to the Estates. He was greeted in an almost royal fashion, with a delegation of senior grandees from the Estates awaiting his arrival, among them Mayenne's son and Cardinal Pellevé. Feria and Pellevé entered the Estates chamber, each taking a seat on opposite sides of a vacant throne that had been set up. He introduced himself with a speech in which he expounded on how Spain had supported France over the centuries. Unable to speak French the speech was delivered in Latin. This point was finished with the recent relief Spain had provided to the cities of Paris and Rouen during their respective sieges, and the vast sums of money Philip had expended in support of the Catholic ligue. This was too much for some in the Estates, and Cardinal Pellevé rose to expound upon the thousand year long services France had given to Spain all the way back to the time of king Clovis. France's service to Spain could be witnessed even in more recent times, as when Bertrand du Guesclin had installed their present dynasty on the throne with the overthrow of Pedro of Castile. Pellevé then in turn alienated many deputies when he stated that Philip would surely find in the afterlife the many grateful French he had saved from damnation by his noble services towards Catholicism.

=== Royalist response ===
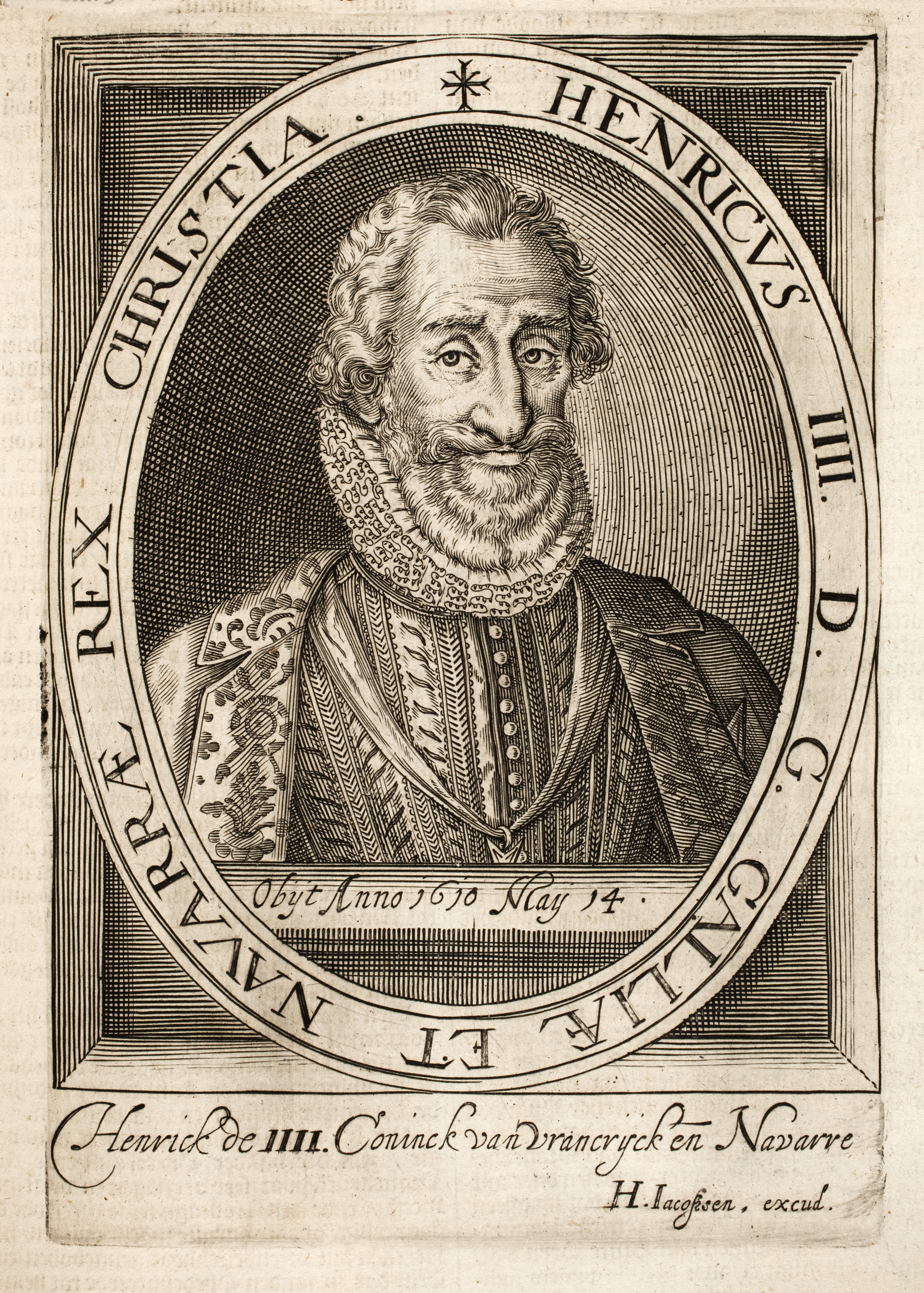
Engraving of Henri IV

Henri was naturally hostile to the ligueur Estates, however he recognised the necessity of working with the body. To this end, while not recognising the Estates as a legitimate convention of the body, he offered talks between the deputies and his agents. Entreaties to this effect were made on 27 January in which the ligueurs were invited to meet to seek a reconciliation. In a follow up declaration on 29 January Henri declared the Estates General illegal and any decisions it undertook invalid. His advisor D'Aubigné decried the Estates as lacking almost any nobles of worth, with not a single prince of the blood, Marshal or Chancellor in attendance. He further compared the gathering to the Estates General of 1420 that had granted the French throne to the English.

The ultra faction of the deputies were appalled by such a proposal to meet with Henri but the Estates at large voted to undertake the talks. The main body of the Estates found themselves alienated from the ultras and disapproving of their socially inferior status, pushing them towards negotiations with the king. The vote was taken on 26 February, while Mayenne was away from the Estates, and resulted in the decision to send a delegation.

Despite agreeing to talks with the Estates, Henri did not want his foreign allies to be under any illusion as to the validity of the body. Therefore, he wrote to Venezia, denouncing the body as a 'reckless and insolent enterprise'.

On March 6 the royal camp received the terms of the Estates for the conduct of talks. Keen to maintain their face, the address was directed specifically at the royalist Catholics around Henri, and not the king himself.

=== Suresne ===
On 29 April a delegation from the Estates met Henri's agents at Suresnes and were successful in arranging a ten-day truce. Representing the ligueur estates were the archbishop of Lyon, the bishop of Avranches, Jean le Maistre (a parlementaire) and Étienne Bernard. Mayenne added onto the Estates chosen delegates his own men: the former secretary of state Villeroy, the ligueur governor of Rouen and future Admiral Villars, the ligueur governor of Paris Belin.

For the royalist delegation, the ligueur Estates vetoed the participation of the bishop of Le Mans, as he was known to support toleration. Therefore, the king selected the archbishop of Bourges, chancellor Pomponne de Bellièvre, Gaspard de Schomberg, Rambouillet a former favourite of Henri III and the royalist Parlementaire Jacques Auguste de Thou.

When the ligueur regime of Paris, known as the Seize (named for the Sixteen districts of the city) learned of the negotiations underway at Suresnes they were horrified. They quickly undertook to push the Estates towards 'their true business', which was to elect a king. The Papal legate at the Estates was also horrified, but was unable to stop the meeting.

On the matter of the truce negotiated at Suresnes, both the Second and Third Estate voted for its adoption, while the First refused to support it. The Seize, increasingly frustrated, attempted to organise another uprising, as they had in 1588, and appealed to Philip to intervene.

The archbishop of Bourges and archbishop of Lyon led the discussion, which began as a debate over the rights to the crown. Bourges succeeded in getting Lyon to say that the ligues only objection to Henri was his religion. This would pave the way for the declaration of 17 May.

=== Conversion ===
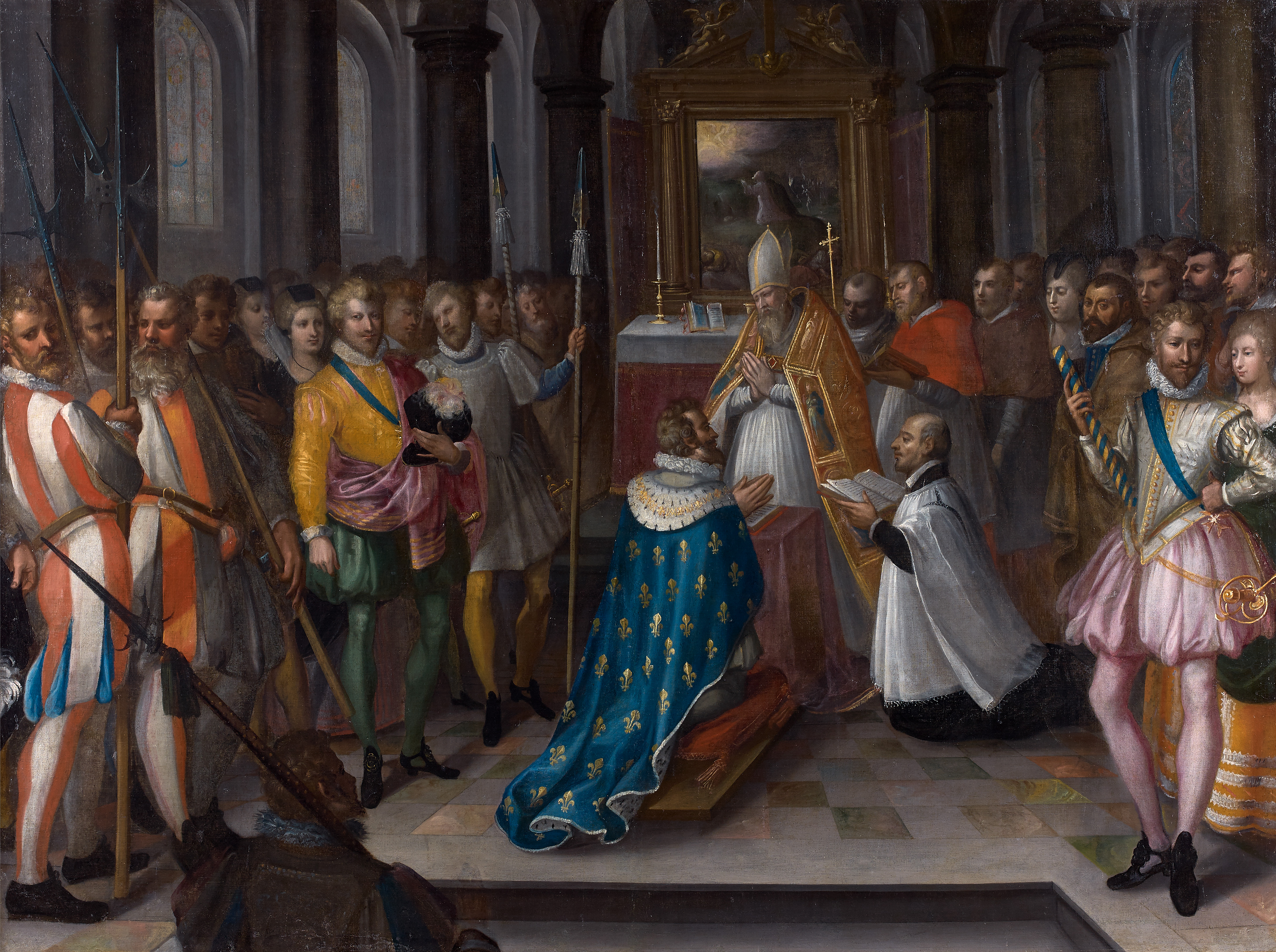
Henri IV abjures at the Basilica of Saint-Denis

On 17 May Henri provided a further sabotage to the Estates when the archbishop of Bourges announced Henri's intentions to abjure Protestantism and become Catholic. The archbishop of Lyon, still present at Suresnes was shocked and managed only to say that he hoped the conversion was a true one and not an attempt to deceive Catholic France. Henri would formally abjure on 24 July, attending mass at Saint-Denis the following day. This conversion would not be sufficient for the hardliners, but would further fracture the ligueur movement.

=== Fourth Estate ===
Mayenne was frustrated by the continued discord in the ligue, and to this end sought to undermine the bourgeois ligue by a proposal in May to establish a Fourth Estate. These members, unlike the rest of the Estates, would not be elected, and rather drawn directly from the senior French magistracy. He hoped through this proposal to garner an Estates with more legitimacy, and one that was easier for him to control. The Estates baulked at this proposal to create a new Estate. One prelate denounced it as an attempt to 'create a monster in our state'.

=== Noble claimants ===
Meanwhile, the Estates began to consider the various candidates for king. There were a considerable number of French princes who held ambitions in that regard. Among them were the duke of Lorraine and his son the marquis du Pont; the duke of Nemours representing the house of Savoie (though the duke of Savoy also had interest); the young duke of Guise, the duke of Mercœur, Mayenne himself and his son the baron d'Aiguillon for the cadet house of Lorraine descended from the first duke of Guise. During May, Mayenne also undertook secret negotiations with the nominally royalist Cardinal Bourbon, nephew of the first Cardinal Bourbon about him succeeding his uncle as ligueur king through a marriage to the Infanta. Cardinal Bourbon had not yet received his orders, and it was therefore possible for him to cast them off and become a secular prince. His candidacy was only pushed half heartedly by some involved, who were using it largely to pressure Henri's conversion.

Of these men, only du Pont and Nemours had a recent Valois heritage to offer. However many of the men's claims was based on descent through the line of a woman, which violated Salic Law. Other candidates looked to a marriage with the Infanta to validate their claims.

In the hopes of coming to a consensus as to who to push on the Estates, the Lorraine-Guise family met at Reims in late April for a family conference. In the six day conference that followed both the young duke of Guise and du Pont were popular candidates, however Mayenne was uninterested in providing his backing to either man. No agreement was therefore reached by the time the conference dissolved and Mayenne returned to the Estates.

=== Infanta ===
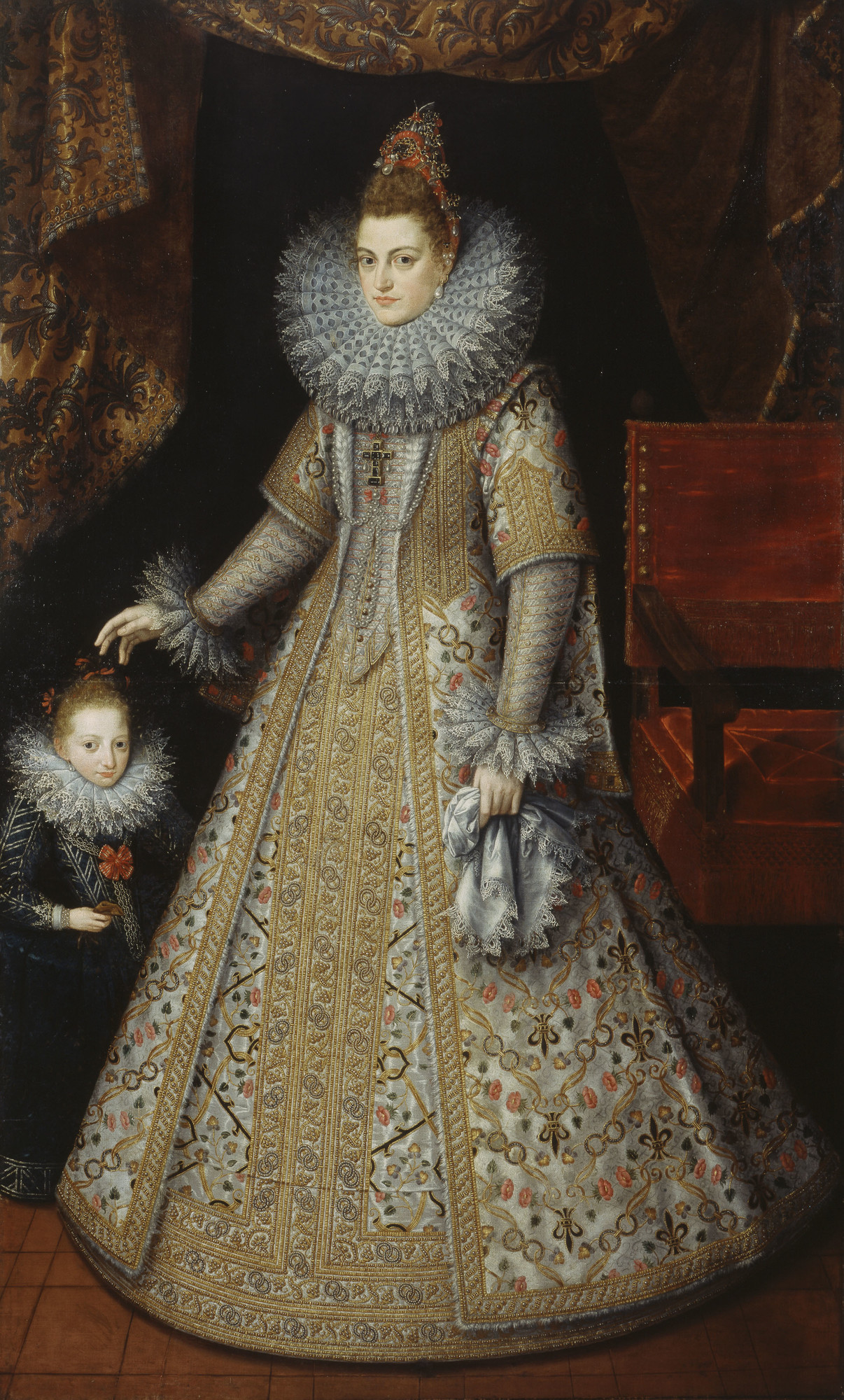
the daughter of the king of Spain, the Infanta

It was on the subject of the Infanta that the Spanish representatives worked to continue to alienate the Estates on 16 May, with their proposals towards her rights to the throne and denunciations of Salic Law as a non-fundamental component of the French state. This time their entreaties were directed by Jean Baptiste de Taxis, who unlike Feria could speak French, he was joined by Don Iñigo de Mendoza who broke down the fallibility of Salic Law in a Latin address. He also reassured the delegates that Philip had enough kingdoms already, and had no designs to claim the French one for himself. This earned the rebuke of several Parlementaire deputies present, among them Edouard Molé, Le Maistre and Du Vair. Even Parlementaires of more solidly ligueur inclination like Hacqueville found it difficult to countenance. They protested to the Estates against the Spanish remarks. Also among those who objected was Guillaume de Rose, the bishop of Senlis. One deputy opined that if Salic Law was not fundamental to the law of France, then all the Valois kings were illegitimate and they should be ruled by the English crown.

By contrast those delegates aligned with the Seize were open to the idea of inheritance being derived through the Infanta.

=== Bribery ===
In the hopes of furthering their position at the Estates, Spanish money was given to many deputies, while the ambassadors continued to cajole the deputies. The Spanish position was however undermined by their poverty, with only 30,000 livres to spread around as opposed to the 200,000 initially promised for the purpose of bribery. 11,148 écus would be given to First Estate delegates, 8,180 to the Third Estate and 4720 to the Second, far too small sums to achieve their desired objectives. Bribes were also offered to the various captains of Paris to ensure their loyalty to Spain. The Spanish had difficult with resistance to accepting their bribes, many proving uninterested. This campaign of bribery was too much for Mayenne who protested.

=== Austrian match ===
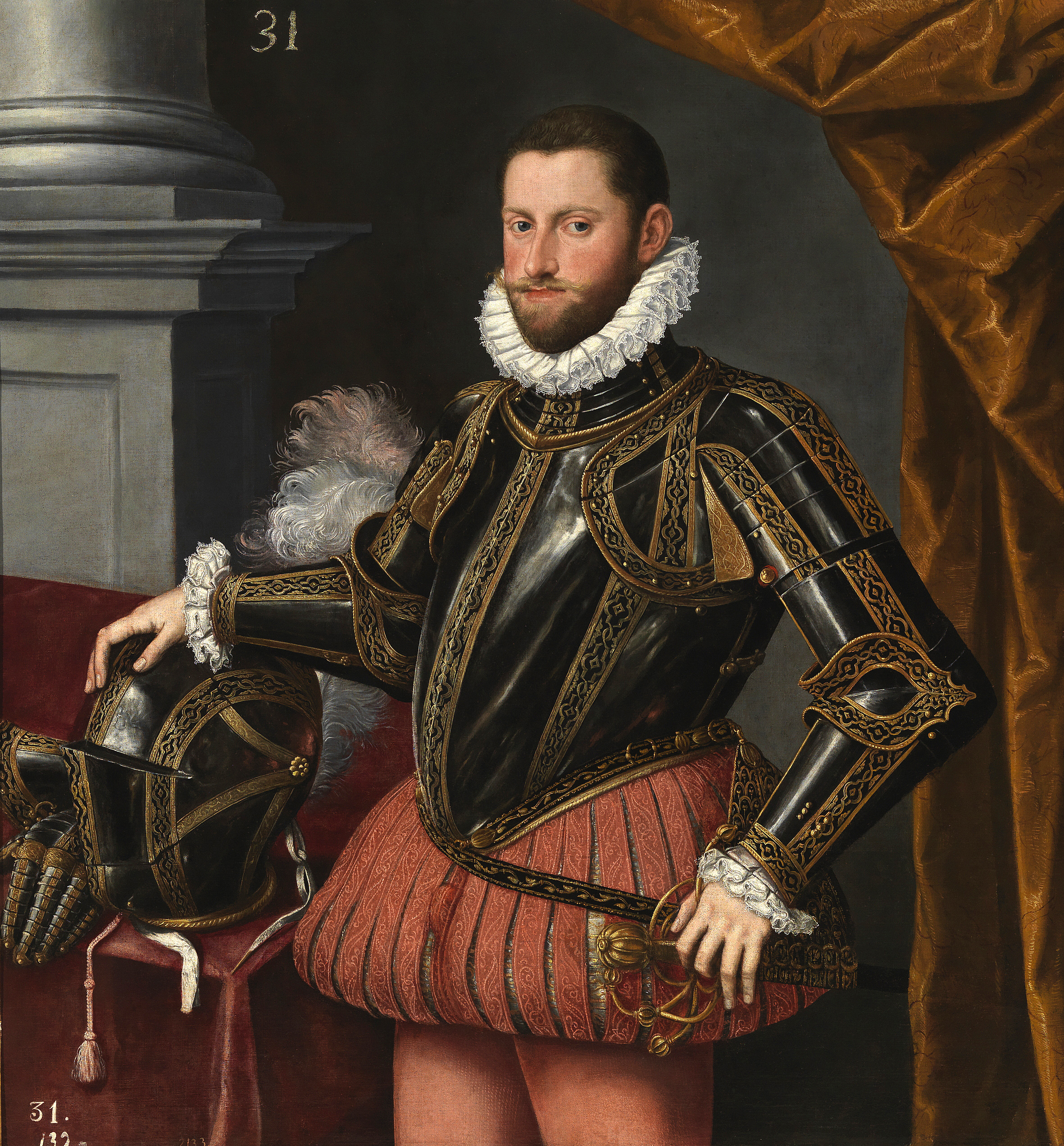
The Archduke, Ernst

On 12 June one of the Spanish delegates went further, provocatively arguing that instead of marrying a French prince, the Infanta as queen of France could marry a Habsburg, the archduke of Austria. To sweeten the pot on this proposal, the Spanish pointed out, that given the Holy Roman Emperor presently lacked an heir, this would likely mean France's new king would succeed to the position and rule both kingdoms. This aroused further outrage from the majority of the Estates. The prospect of electing two foreigners to the throne was even too much for many of the Seize deputies. The proposal was formally rejected by the Estates on 18 June. Mayenne intervened to ask the Estates to request that the Infanta be given a French husband. He proposed his own son, though this was shot down by the Estates, with some walking out. It was by now too late for Mayenne to re-secure the loyalty of the Parlementaire moderate ligueurs, Du Vair and many of the Île de France deputies had walked out.

Back in the Paris Parlement, the returned deputies set about sabotaging the Estates. On 28 June the Parlement issued a decree in which they defended Salic Law as a fundamental law of the kingdom and established that the crown could never be given to a foreign prince as such a treaty would be void in violation of the laws of the kingdom. Both Mayenne and the Seize denounced the decree.

=== Guise match ===
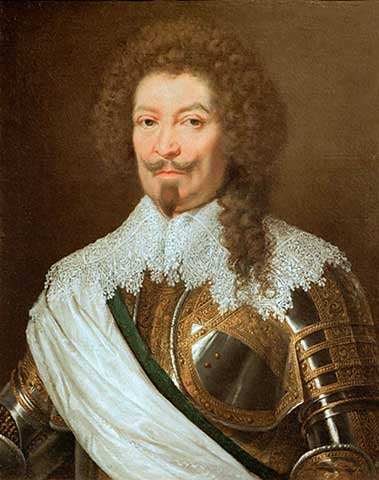
Seventeenth Century portrait of the duke of Guise

The Spanish considered the Parlements declaration to be null and therefore pressed on with their efforts regarding the Infanta. Recognising that they had perhaps gone too far, the Spanish returned in early July with a new proposal, the Infanta could marry the popular French prince, the duke of Guise. They had missed their moment however, and the Estates, which might a month earlier have supported such a proposal, were no longer interested in hearing their entreaties. A majority in both the Second and Third Estate had by this point decided that it was not their place to elect a king. This was motivated both by changing opinions among the ligueur leadership as to the succession, and more material factors, Henri possessed a large army that was a not inconsiderable distance from Paris. In mid June Henri besieged and captured Dreux to drive home the point. Mayenne and the duke of Lorraine were also largely uninterested in this proposal. Mayenne proposed to the Spanish a list of demands for his acceptance of the candidacy of the young Guise which would have left him as the true power in France with his nephew as little but a figurehead. Among his demands was hereditary control of Bourgogne, the lieutenant-generalcy of the kingdom, control of Picardie during his lifetime and a large amount of money. Nemours dismissed Guise as a "young fool who has his mother to help him get ahead". Mayenne's wife referred to the prince as a "little boy who still needs a spanking". These internal divisions in the Lorraine family would greatly benefit Henri. Even Guise, who stood to become king in this proposal did not take it particularly seriously.

By late July Mayenne informed the Spanish that at this point he would only proceed with trying to push through the election of an alternate king if a sizable Spanish army could be provided in the area of Paris.

On 31 July 1593 a truce was reached between Henri and Mayenne with an initial planned duration of three months.

=== Tridentine decrees ===
With little being accomplished towards electing a king, the Estates turned to the matter of ratifying the Tridentine Decrees, which pleased the ligueur clergy. This was passed by the Estates on 30 July, despite the uniform opposition of the Parisian Third Estate. The Estates would meet as a whole body for the final time on 8 August, at which point they were technically extended into October. This done Mayenne proceeded to prorogue the Estates. While some deputies would remain in the capital until December, the Estates were over.

== Legacy ==
The failures of the Estates General to come to a consensus as to a candidate for king (or achieve much else) would strike a heavy blow for the cohesion of the ligue as the aristocratic and bourgeois elements that composed it frayed.

The Estates of 1593 would be subject to a famous vicious satire, Le Satyre Ménippée which ridiculed the various participants. Speeches were put in the mouths of various delegates. Its participants were characterised as vicious sectarian charlatans.

== Sources ==
- Babelon, Jean-Pierre (2009). Henri IV. Fayard.
- Baumgartner, Frederic (1986). Change and Continuity in the French Episcopate: The Bishops and the Wars of Religion 1547-1610.
- Bernstein, Hilary (2004). Between Crown and Community: Politics and Civic Culture in Sixteenth-Century Poitiers. Cornell University Press.
- Carroll, Stuart (2005). Noble Power During the French Wars of Religion: The Guise Affinity and the Catholic Cause in Normandy. Cambridge University Press.
- Carroll, Stuart (2011). Martyrs and Murderers: The Guise Family and the Making of Europe. Oxford University Press.
- Constant, Jean-Marie (1996). La Ligue. Fayard.
- Harding, Robert (1978). Anatomy of a Power Elite: the Provincial Governors in Early Modern France. Yale University Press.
- Heller, Henry (2003). Anti-Italianism in Sixteenth Century France. University of Toronto Press.
- Holt, Mack P. (2005). The French Wars of Religion, 1562-1629. Cambridge University Press.
- Jouanna, Arlette (1998). Histoire et Dictionnaire des Guerres de Religion. Bouquins.
- Knecht, Robert (2010). The French Wars of Religion, 1559-1598. Routledge.
- Konnert, Mark (2006). Local Politics in the French Wars of Religion: The Towns of Champagne, the Duc de Guise and the Catholic League 1560-1595. Ashgate.
- Mariéjol, Jean H. (1983). La Réforme, la Ligue, l'Édit de Nantes. Tallandier.
- Pitts, Vincent (2012). Henri IV of France: His Reign and Age. Johns Hopkins University Press.
- Roelker, Nancy (1996). One King, One Faith: The Parlement of Paris and the Religious Reformation of the Sixteenth Century. University of California Press.
- Salmon, J.H.M (1979). Society in Crisis: France during the Sixteenth Century. Metheun & Co.
