= Estates General (France) =

Consultative assembly in France, 1302 to 1789

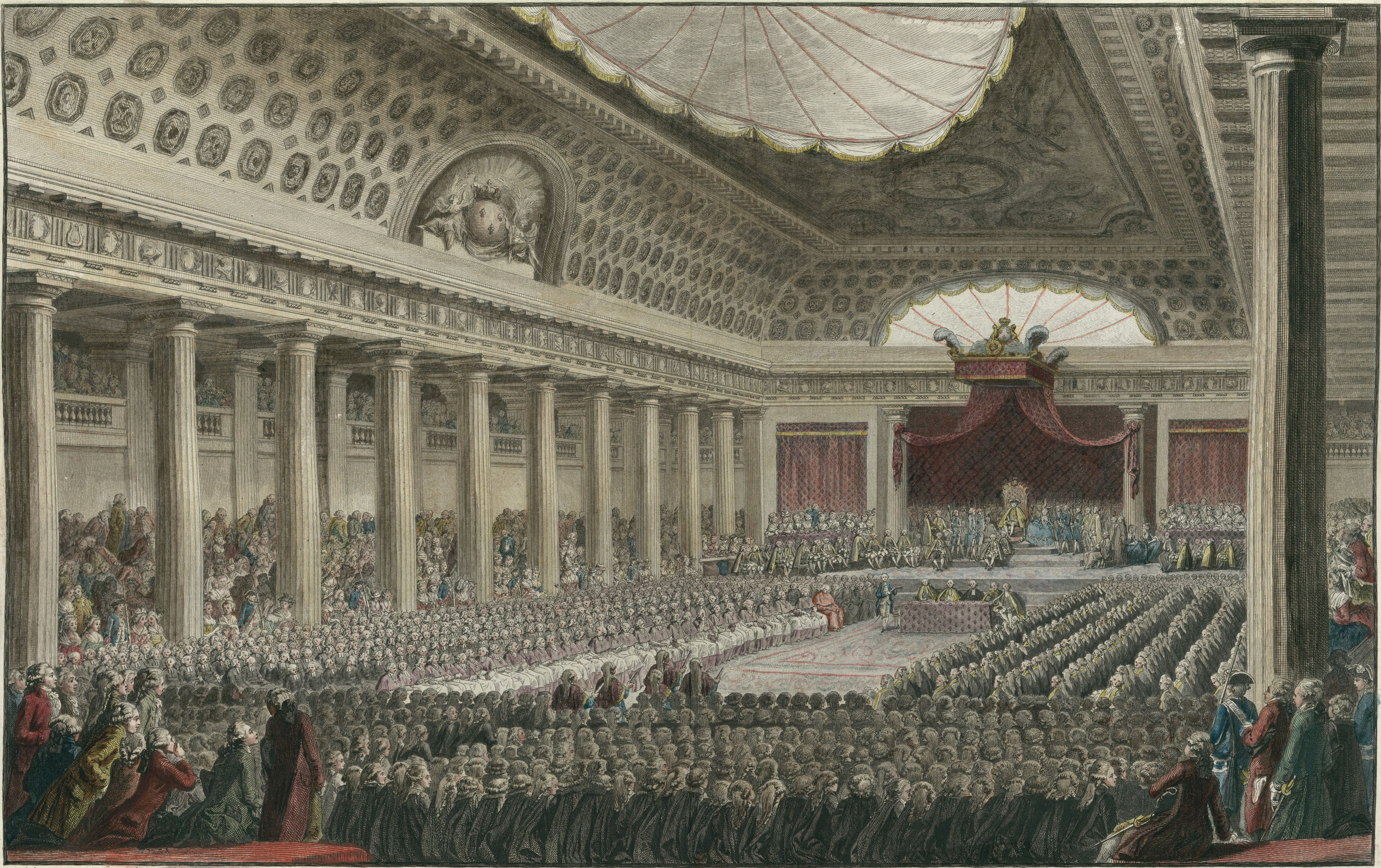
Opening of the Estates General on 5 May 1789 in the Grands Salles des Menus-Plaisirs in Versailles

In France under the ancien régime, the Estates General (French: États généraux [eta ʒeneʁo]) or States-General was a legislative and consultative assembly of the different classes (or estates) of French subjects. It had a separate assembly for each of the three estates (clergy, nobility and commoners), which were called and dismissed by the king. It had no true power in its own right as, unlike the English Parliament, it was not required to approve royal taxation or legislation. It served as an advisory body to the king, primarily by presenting petitions from the various estates and consulting on fiscal policy.

The Estates General first met in 1302 and 1303 in relation to King Philip IV's conflict with the papacy. They met intermittently until 1614 and only once afterward, in 1789, but were not definitively dissolved until after the French Revolution. The Estates General were distinct from the parlements (the most powerful of which was the Parlement of Paris), which started as appellate courts but later used their powers to decide whether to publish laws to claim a legislative role.

The Estates General had similarities with institutions in other European polities, generally known as the Estates, such as the States General of the Netherlands, the Parliament of England, the Estates of Parliament of Scotland, the Sejm of Poland-Lithuania, the Cortes of Portugal, the Cortes of Spain, the Imperial Diet (Reichstag) of the Holy Roman Empire, the Diets (German: Tage) of the Imperial Estates of the Empire, the Parliamentum Publicum of Hungary, and the Swedish Riksdag of the Estates. Unlike some of these institutions, however, France's Estates General were only summoned at irregular intervals by the king and never grew into a permanent legislative body.

== Origin ==
The first national assembly of the Estates General was in 1302, summoned by King Philip IV, to address a conflict with Pope Boniface VIII. The letters summoning the assembly of 1302 are published by Georges Picot in his collection of Documents inédits pour servir à l'histoire de France. During Philip's reign, the Estates General were subsequently assembled several times to give him aid by granting subsidies. Over time, subsidies came to be the most frequent motive for their convocation.

The composition and powers of the Estates General remained the same: they always included representatives of the First Estate (clergy), Second Estate (the nobility), and Third Estate (commoners: all others), and monarchs always summoned them either to grant subsidies or to advise the Crown, to give aid and counsel. Their composition, however, as well as their effective powers, varied greatly at different times.

In their primitive form in the 14th and the first half of the 15th centuries, the Estates General had only a limited elective element. The lay lords and the ecclesiastical lords (bishops and other high clergy) who made up the Estates General were not elected by their peers, but directly chosen and summoned by the king. In the order of the clergy, however, certain ecclesiastical bodies, e.g. abbeys and chapters of cathedrals, were also summoned to the assembly. Since these bodies, being persons in the moral but not in the physical sense, could not appear in person, their representative had to be chosen by the monks of the convent or the canons of the chapter.

Only representatives of the Third Estate were chosen by election. Originally, all commoners were not called upon to seek representation in the estates. Only the bonnes villes, or the privileged towns, were called upon. They were represented by elected procureurs, who were frequently the municipal officials of the town, but deputies were also elected for the purpose. The country districts, the plat pays, were not represented. Even within the bonnes villes, the franchise was quite narrow.

== Rise and fall of power ==
The effective powers of the Estates General likewise varied over time. In the 14th century, they were considerable. The king could not, in theory, levy general taxation. Even in the provinces attached to the domain of the Crown, he could levy it only where he had retained the haute justice over the inhabitants, but not on the subjects of lords having the haute justice. The privileged towns generally had the right of taxing themselves. To collect general taxes, the king required consent of the lay and ecclesiastical lords, and of the towns. This amounted to needing authorization from the Estates General, which granted these subsidies only temporarily and for fairly short periods. As a result, they were summoned frequently and their power over the Crown became considerable.

In the second half of the 14th century, however, certain royal taxes, levied throughout the Crown's domain, tended to become permanent and independent of the vote of the estates. This result drew from many causes, particularly, the Crown endeavoured to transform and change the nature of the "feudal aid" to levy a general tax by right, on its own authority, in such cases as those in which a lord could demand feudal aid from his vassals. For instance, the Crown thus raised the necessary taxes for twenty years to pay the ransom of King John II of France without a vote of the Estates General, although the assembly met several times during this period. Custom confined this tendency. During the second half of the 15th century, the chief taxes, the taille, aids and gabelle became definitely permanent for the benefit of the Crown. In some cases, there was formal consent of the Estates General, as in 1437 in the case of the aids.

The critical periods of the Hundred Years' War favoured the Estates General, though at the price of great sacrifices. Under the reign of King John II, from 1355 to 1358, the Estates General had controlled not only the voting but, through their commissaries, the administration of and jurisdiction over the taxes. In the first half of the reign of Charles VII, they had been summoned almost every year and had dutifully voted subsidies for the Crown. But when the struggle was over, they renounced the power of the purse.

At the estates of 1484, however, after the death of Louis XI, the Duke of Orleans sought to obtain the regency during the minority of Charles VIII. The Estates sided with Charles's sister Anne de Beaujeu and refused.

Deputies of the three orders united their efforts in the hope of regaining the right of periodically sanctioning taxation. They voted the taille for two years only, at the same time reducing it to the amount it had reached at the end of the reign of Charles VII. They demanded, and obtained, the promise of the Crown that they should be summoned again before the two years had ended. But this promise was not kept, and the Estates General were not summoned again until 1560. During this 76-year interim, successive kings expanded the role of the centralised state through various means. In the mid-16th century, public officials (officiers) explored the option of forming a fourth order of their own kind but their attempts went nowhere, largely because of the attractiveness of becoming nobility to many of them.

== Revival in 1560–1614 ==
The Estates General was revived in the second half of the 16th century because of scarcity of money and the quarrels and Wars of Religion. There would be estates at Orleans in 1560, followed by those of Pontoise in 1561, and those of Blois in 1576 and 1588. Those of 1588 ended with a coup d'état by Henri III, and the States summoned by the League, which sat in Paris in 1593 and whose chief object was to elect a Catholic king, were not a success. The Estates General again met in Paris in 1614 [fr], on the occasion of the disturbances that followed the death of Henry IV; however, though their minutes bear witness to their sentiments of exalted patriotism, dissensions between the three orders rendered them weak. They dissolved before completing their work and were not summoned again until 1789.

As to the question whether the Estates General formed one or three chambers for the purposes of their working, from the constitutional point of view the point was never decided. What the king required was to have the consent, the resolution of the three estates of the realm; it was in reality of little importance to him whether their resolutions expressed themselves in common or separately. At the Estates General of 1484, the elections were made in common for the three orders, and the deputies also arrived at their resolutions in common. But after 1560, the rule was that each order deliberate separately; the royal declaration of 23 June 1789 (at the outbreak of the French Revolution) even stated that they formed three distinct chambers. But Necker's report to the conseil du roi according to which the convocation of 1789 was decided, said (as did the declaration of 23 June), that on matters of common interest the deputies of the three orders could deliberate together, if each of the others decided by a separate vote in favour of this, and if the king consented.

The working of the Estates General led to an almost exclusive system of deliberation by committees. There were, it is true, solemn general sessions, called séances royales, because the king presided; but at these there was no discussion. At the first, the king or his chancellor announced the object of the convocation, and set forth the demands or questions put to them by the Crown; at the other royal sessions each order made known its answers or observations by the mouth of an orateur elected for the purpose. But almost all useful work was done in the sections, among which the deputies of each order were divided. At the estates of 1484, they were divided into six nations or sections, corresponding to the six généralités then existing. Subsequently, the deputies belonging to the same gouvernement formed a group or bureau for deliberating and voting purposes. Certain questions, however, were discussed and decided in full assembly; sometimes, too, the estates nominated commissaries in equal numbers for each order. But in the ancient Estates General, there was never any personal vote. The unit represented for each of the three orders was the bailliage or sénéchaussé and each bailliage had one vote, the majority of the deputies of the bailliage deciding in what way this vote should be given.

At the estates of the 16th century, voting was by gouvernements, each gouvernement having one vote, but the majority of the bailliages composing the gouvernement decided how it should be given.

The Estates General, when they gave counsel, had in theory only a consultative faculty. They had the power of granting subsidies, which was the chief and ordinary cause of their convocation. But it had come to be a consent with which the king could dispense, as permanent taxation became established. In the 16th century, however, the estates again claimed that their consent was necessary for the establishment of new taxation, and, on the whole, the facts seemed to be in favour of this view at the time. However, in the course of the 17th century the principle gained recognition that the king could tax on his own sole authority. Thus were established in the second half of the 17th century, and in the 18th, the direct taxes of the capitation and of the dixième or vingtième, and many indirect taxes. It was sufficient for the law creating them to be registered by the cours des aides and the parlements. It was only in 1787 that the parlement of Paris declared that it could not register the new taxes, the land-tax and stamp duty (subvention territoriale and impôt du timbre), as they did not know whether they would be submitted to by the country, and that the consent of the representatives of the tax-payers must be asked.

The Estates General had legally no share in the legislative power, which belonged to the king alone. The Estates of Blois demanded in 1576 that the king be bound to turn into law any proposition voted in identical terms by each of the three orders; but Henry III would not grant this demand, which would not even have left him a right of veto. In practice, however, the Estates General contributed largely to legislation. Those who sat in them had at all times the right of presenting complaints (doléances), requests and petitions to the king; in this, indeed, consisted their sole initiative. They were usually answered by an ordonnance, and it is chiefly through these that we are acquainted with the activity of the estates of the 14th and 15th centuries.

In the latest form, and from the estates of 1484 onwards, this was done by a new and special procedure. The Estates had become an entirely elective assembly, and at the elections (at each step of the election if there were several) the electors drew up a cahier de doléances (statement of grievances), which they requested the deputies to present. This even appeared to be the most important feature of an election. The deputies of each order in every bailliage also brought with them a cahier des doléances, arrived at, for the third estate, by a combination of statements drawn up by the primary or secondary electors. On the assembly of the estates, the cahiers of the bailliages were incorporated into a cahier for each gouvernement, and these again into a cahier general or general statement, which was presented to the king, and which he answered in his council. When the three orders deliberated in common, as in 1484, there was only one cahier général; when they deliberated separately, there were three, one for each order. The drawing up of the cahier general was looked upon as the main business (le grand œuvre) of the session.

By this means, the Estates General furnished the material for numerous ordonnances, though the king did not always adopt the propositions contained in the cahiers, and often modified them in forming them into an ordonnance. These latter were the ordonnances de reforme (reforming ordinances), treating of the most varied subjects, according to the demands of the cahiers. They were not, however, for the most part very well observed. The last of the type was the grande ordonnance of 1629 (Code Michau), drawn up in accordance with the cahiers of 1614 and with the observations of various assemblies of notables that followed them.

The peculiar power of the Estates General was recognized, but was of a kind that could not often be exercised. It was, essentially, a constituent power. The ancient public law of France contained a number of rules called the "fundamental laws of the kingdom" (lois fondamentales du royaume), though most of them were purely customary. Chief among these were rules that determined the succession to the Crown and rules forbidding alienation of the domain of the Crown. The king, supreme though his power might be, could not abrogate, modify or infringe them. But it was admitted that he might do so by the consent of the Estates General. The Estates could give the king a dispensation from a fundamental law in a given instance; they could even, in agreement with the king, make new fundamental laws. The Estates of Blois of 1576 and 1588 offer entirely convincing precedents in this respect. It was universally recognized that in the event of the line of Hugh Capet becoming extinct, it would be the function of the States-General to elect a new king.

The Estates General of 1614 proved the last for over a century and a half. A new convocation had indeed been announced to take place on the majority of Louis XIII, and letters were even issued in view of the elections, but this ended in nothing. Absolute monarchy progressively became definitely established, and appeared incompatible with the institution of the Estates General. Liberal minds, however, in the entourage of Louis, duc de Bourgogne, who were preparing a new plan of government in view of his expected accession to the French throne in succession to Louis XIV, thought of reviving the institution. It figures in the projects of Saint-Simon and Fénelon, though the latter would have preferred to begin with an assembly of non-elected notables. But though St Simon stood high in the favor of the regent Orléans, the death of Louis XIV did not see a summoning of the Estates.

== 1789 ==
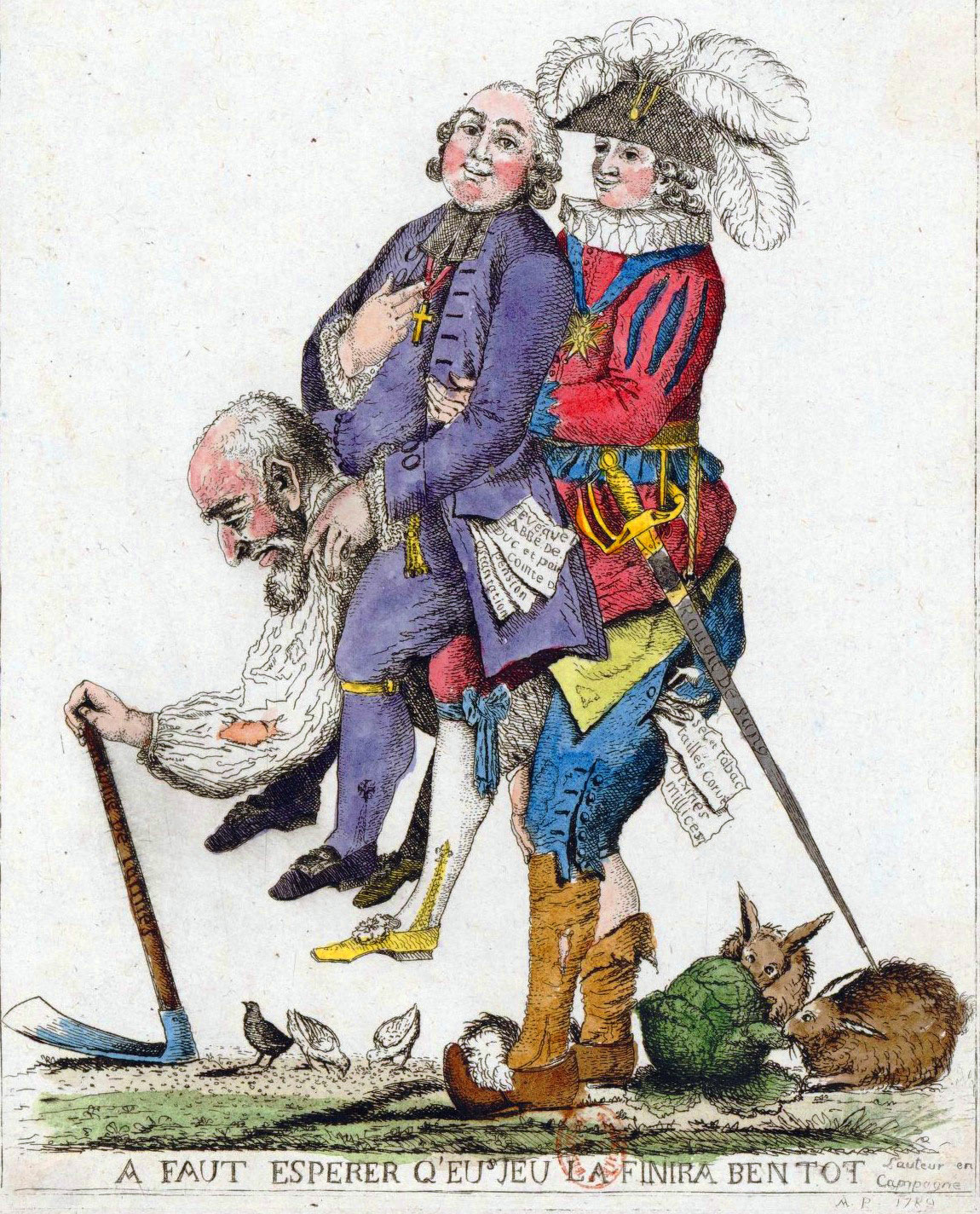
Caricature from 1789 with the Third Estate carrying the First Estate and Second Estate on its back

At the time of the revolution, the First Estate comprised 100,000 Catholic clergy and owned 5–10% of the lands in France—the highest per capita of any estate. All property of the First Estate was tax exempt.

The Second Estate comprised the nobility, which consisted of 400,000 people, including women and children. Since the death of Louis XIV in 1715, the nobles had enjoyed a resurgence in power. By the time of the revolution, they had almost a monopoly over distinguished government service, higher offices in the church, army, and parliaments, and most other public and semi-public honors. Under the principle of feudal precedent, they were not taxed.

The Third Estate comprised about 25 million people: the bourgeoisie, the peasants, and everyone else in France. Unlike the First and Second Estates, the Third Estate were compelled to pay taxes. The bourgeoisie found ways to evade them and become exempt. The major burden of the French government fell upon the poorest in French society: the farmers, peasantry, and working poor. The Third Estate had considerable resentment toward the upper classes.

In 1789, the Estates General was summoned for the first time since 1614. As François Fénelon had promoted in the 17th century, an Assembly of Notables in 1787 (which already displayed great independence) preceded the Estates General session. According to Fénelon's model of 1614, the Estates General would consist of equal numbers of representatives of each Estate. During the Revolution, the Third Estate demanded, and ultimately received, double representation, which they already had achieved in the provincial assemblies. When the Estates General convened in Versailles on 5 May 1789, however, it became clear that the double representation was something of a sham: voting was to occur "by orders", which meant that the collective vote of the 578 representatives of the Third Estate would be weighed the same as that of each of the other, less numerous Estates.

Royal efforts to focus solely on taxes failed totally. The Estates General reached an immediate impasse, debating (with each of the three estates meeting separately) its own structure rather than the nation's finances. On 28 May 1789, Abbé Sieyès moved that the Third Estate, now meeting as the Communes (English: Commons), proceed with verification of its own powers and invite the other two estates to take part, but not to wait for them. They proceeded to do so, completing the process on June 17. They voted a measure far more radical, declaring themselves the National Assembly, an assembly not of the Estates but of "the People". They invited the other orders to join them, but emphasized that they intended to conduct the nation's affairs with or without them.

King Louis XVI of France tried to resist. When he shut down the Salle des États where the Assembly met, the Assembly moved its deliberations to a nearby tennis court. They swore the Tennis Court Oath (20 June 1789), under which they agreed not to separate until they had given France a constitution. A majority of the representatives of the clergy soon joined them, as did forty-seven members of the nobility. By 27 June, the royal party had overtly given in. But military forces began to arrive in large numbers around Paris and Versailles. Messages of support for the Assembly poured in from Paris and other French cities. On 9 July, the Assembly reconstituted itself as the National Constituent Assembly.

== List ==
- Reign of Philip IV (1285–1314)
  - 1302, at Notre-Dame de Paris
  - 1303, at the Louvre Palace in Paris
  - 1308, at Poitiers then Tours
  - 1312, at Lyon
  - 1313, at Paris
  - 1314, at the Palais de la Cité in Paris
- Reign of Philip V (1316–1322)
  - 1317, in Paris
  - 1320; in Pontoise
  - 1321, in Poitiers
- Reign of Charles IV (1322–1328)
  - 1322
  - 1326, at Meaux
- Reign of Philip VI (1328–1350)
  - 1343
  - 1346, at Paris and Toulouse
- Reign of John II (1350–1364)
  - 1355–1356, in Paris and Toulouse
  - 1356, at Paris
  - 1357, at Paris
  - 1358, at Compiègne
  - 1359
  - November 1363, at Amiens
- Reign of Charles V (1364–1380)
  - December 1369, at the Palais de la Cité in Paris
- Reign of Charles VI (1380–1422)
  - 1380-81, several meetings in Paris and Compiègne whose qualification as Estates-General is disputed
  - 1413, at the Hôtel Saint-Pol in Paris
  - 1420, at the Hôtel Saint-Pol in Paris
- Reign of Charles VII (1422–1461)
  - 1439, at Orléans
  - 1448, at Bourges
- Reign of Louis XI (1461–1483)
  - 1468, at Tours
- Reign of Charles VIII (1483–1498)
  - 1484, at Tours
- Reign of Charles IX (1560–1574)
  - 1560–1561, at Orléans (convened by François II)
  - 1561, at Pontoise
- Reign of Henry III (1574–1589)
  - 1576–1577, at the Château de Blois
  - 1588–1589, at the Château de Blois
- Reign of Henry IV (1589–1610)
  - 1593, at the Louvre Palace in Paris (meeting organized by the Catholic League)
- Reign of Louis XIII (1610–1643)
  - 1614–1615, at the Hôtel du Petit-Bourbon (by then a dependency of the Louvre Palace) in Paris
- Reign of Louis XVI (1774–1792)
  - 1789, at the Hôtel des Menus-Plaisirs in Versailles

== See also ==
- Fundamental laws of the Kingdom of France
- States General of the Netherlands
- Estates General of French Canada
- The Estates
- States provincial (France)
