= Renaud de Beaune =

French Catholic archbishop (1527–1606)

- Archbishop of Sens
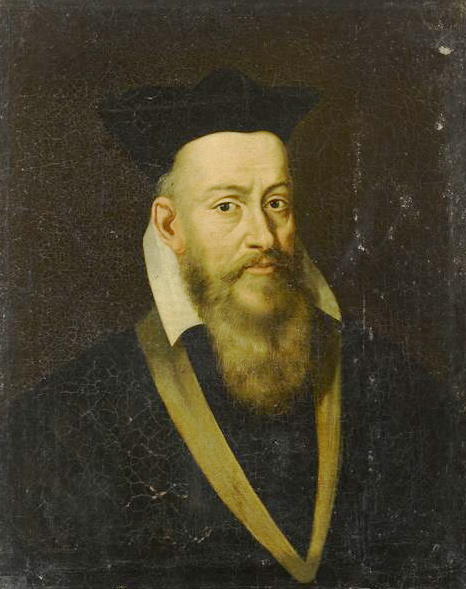
- Church: Roman Catholic Church
- Archdiocese: Bourges (1581–1598); Sens (1598–1606)
- Diocese: Mende (1571–1581)
- Installed: 18 June 1571 (Mende); 10 July 1581 (Bourges); 7 January 1598 (Sens)
- Term ended: 10 July 1581 (Mende); 7 January 1598 (Bourges); 27 September 1606 (Sens)
- Predecessor: Nicolas Dangu (Mende); Antoine Vialart (Bourges); Nicolas de Pellevé (Sens)
- Successor: Antonio de Tremblay (Mende); André Frémiot (Bourges); Jacques Davy Duperron (Sens)

Personal details
- Born: 12 August 1527; Tours, Kingdom of France
- Died: 27 September 1606 (aged 79); Paris, Kingdom of France
- Coat of arms

Renaud de Beaune (12 August 1527 – 27 September 1606) was a French Catholic ecclesiastic.

== Life ==
He held secular positions such as Councillor of Parliament and Chancellor of Francis of Valois, Duke of Touraine. The royal court greatly favoured him and appointed him to numerous ecclesiastical offices. In 1568, he became Bishop of Mende and in 1581, Archbishop of Bourges. King Henry IV of France named him his grand almoner in 1591 and appointed him to the Archbishopric of Sens in 1595; but the pope did not confirm the appointment until 1602.

He was a member of the commission instituted by Henry IV in 1600 to reform the University of Paris. By his contemporaries, Renaud de Beaune was considered one of the greatest orators of the time. Posterity rated his work for the pacification of France higher than his oratorical talent.

It was his influence that led to the successful issue of the conference of Suresnes, near Paris, in 1593. He promised the conversion of Henry IV and brought about peace between the latter and the "League". He received the abjuration of the king, and, although the absolution of an excommunicated prince was reserved to the pope, absolved him, July, 1593, on condition, however, that the approval of the Roman authorities should be obtained. In spite of this condition the absolution was invalid, and the action of the archbishop caused, at least partly, the delay in obtaining the papal confirmation of his nomination to the See of Sens.

== Works ==
The principal works of de Beaune are:

- Some discourses, among them funeral orations on Mary, Queen of Scots (1587), and on Queen Catharine de Medici (1589)
- translation of the Psalms of David into French (Paris, 1575, 1637)
- "La reformation de l'université de Paris (1605, 1667).
