= Estates General of 1560–1561 =

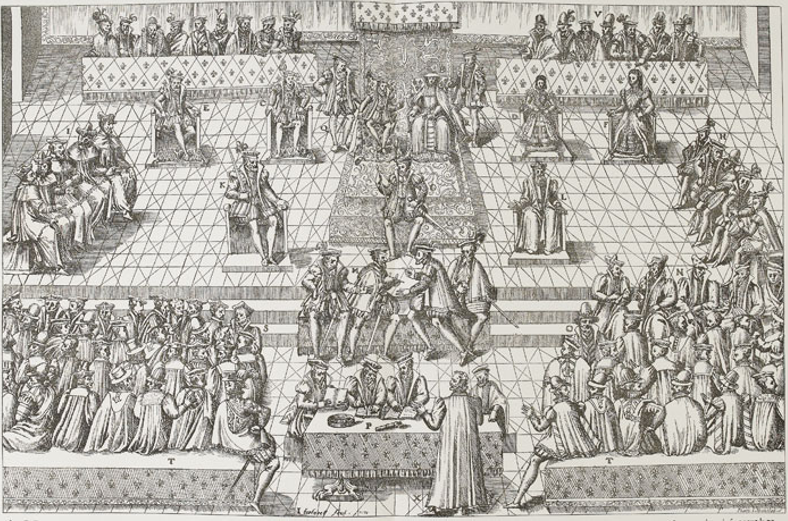
The Estates General in session at Orléans

The Estates General of 1560–1561 was a national meeting of the three estates of France, the clergy, nobility and commoners convoked by François II, though he would die before it could begin. It represented the first meeting of the estates general in 76 years, the last one having been convened by Charles VIII at Tours. Meeting at Orléans the estates would be tasked with providing solutions to the crowns dire fiscal problems, a legacy of the Habsburg–Valois Wars, and the growing religious problem caused by the Reformation. The estates would however be unable to finish their deliberations, with Catherine de' Medici proroguing the session, and reconvening the estates general at a later date in 1561 at Pontoise, where she sought a more agreeable selection of delegates. Ultimately the work of the estates would solve neither the crowns fiscal insolvency or the religious conflict, which exploded in the first French War of Religion.

== Prior crisis ==
=== Financial ===
With the peace of Cateau-Cambrésis in 1559, the crown was left on the cusp of bankruptcy. The public deficit stood at 40 million livres, of which 19 million was owed immediately. The interest rates on these loans were not insignificant, as lenders had grown wary of the crowns inability to pay over the years and this lack of confidence would only be furthered with Henry II's death. Many royal officials had been without pay for four years. An optimistic assessment put the crown's annual revenue at 12 million livres total, though this was not truly feasible to raise due to evasion. These fiscal problems were compounded by a crisis of authority, with the king, Henry II accidentally killed during a celebration marking the peace on 10 July. With his death the administration passed into the hands of the sickly young François II who was governed by his maternal uncles, François, Duke of Guise and Charles, Cardinal of Lorraine. To try and set about fixing the realms finances, they embarked upon an aggressive campaign of cost cutting, scaling down the size of the army from its height in the wars, and deferring payments to the troops, who angrily protested against the Guises. This would not however be enough, so they were moved to raise forced loans from the provinces, such as 800,000 livres from Normandy, to cover shortfalls. They further suppressed Venal office.

Forced loans would continue into 1560, with 100,000 crowns being demanded of the Parlement and merchants of Paris in October 1560, shortly after the convoking of the estates had taken place.

=== Religious ===
Despite the efforts of Henri II, Calvinism had continued to grow in France. This first reached a head after France lost the battle of St. Quentin with a mob storming a Huguenot worship sight on the rue Saint-Jacques, believing them responsible. After this things quieted down until Henri II attended a mercurial session of Parlement in June 1559, to complain about the Parlements lax handling of heresy cases, and to push them to deal with radicals in their ranks. After this, several of the more radical deputies rose to challenge the king, including Anne du Bourg who personally attacked the king, enraging him. The king ordered the arrest of du Bourg and 6 others, vowing to see du Bourg burn with own eyes. The trial of du Bourg exploded religious tensions in the capital, with many attempts to jail break him and a leading conservative Parlementaire being assassinated in December. This would all aid the precipitation of the Saint-Medard religious riot in December, that left several dead. The situation continued to deteriorate in France in 1560, with a wide-ranging Huguenot involved conspiracy to kidnap the king and remove his Catholic guardians, the Guise. After the failure of Amboise, the south of France fell increasingly out of the governments hands, as the Protestant heartlands began seeing the seizure of churches, and further attempting a violent seizure of Lyon in August. All this increased the urgency of a solution to the religious question, that the Cardinal of Lorraine believed could be attained with a reformation of morals in the Catholic church, to excise corruption and absentee bishops, thus bringing Protestant, and Catholic back into the same fold.

=== Political ===
The sudden death of Henri II in 1559, meant that the King of France was now François II, a 15-year-old boy, technically old enough to rule without a regency, but lacking the will or constitution to do so. This created a situation of sharp contrast with the previous decade, where there was no longer a strong royal figure at the centre of the administration guiding policy. This crisis was only furthered more by his death in turn at the age of 16, to be succeeded by his minor brother Charles IX of France on 5 December 1560. This meant a formal regency would be required, which would require the approval of the estates general to be legal. The estates were thought to be preferential towards a regency under Antoine of Navarre so to head this off, Catherine made a deal with him by which he renounced his rights to the regency, in return for the position of Lieutenant General.

== Calling the Estates General ==
In August 1560, in the wake of the Conspiracy of Amboise and Lyon, the Guise summoned an Assembly of Notables, composed of the leading aristocrats of the realm, with the exception of Antoine of Navarre and Louis, Prince of Condé who were conscious they would likely be arrested if they attended. At this assembly the 40 grandees announced a proposal for a package of reforms, for an Estates General to consider and concurrently called for a national religious council. The intention was for this estates general to convene at Meaux however with the rebellious atmosphere in the country, it was decided to move the location from this heart of French Protestantism to Orléans instead. The proposed start date being 10 December.

Conde arrived at Orléans for the estates general on 30 October, and was promptly arrested, accused of involvement in Amboise and Lyon and sentenced to death.

== Orléans ==
=== Preparation ===
Front page of the Cahiers of the Estates General

Before the estates proper could convene preparatory local assemblies were held among the individual estates, with the third and second estate concluding among themselves that clerical property should be confiscated, both as a tonic to the crowns financial problems, and as a method of righting the wrongs in the church morally. This they held would allow the king to reduce taxation. Grimaudet was one of the champions of this among the second estate, critiquing the wasteful nature of clerical administration alongside the abuses of the clergy. He also critiqued what he felt had become a dilution of nobility, with men of common stock entering the ranks of the second estate off the back of their wealth.

=== Opening the estates ===
The estates of Orléans would be opened by a speech from the reformist chancellor Michel de l'Hôpital in which he called for the suppression of religious passions. Urging the members assembled to repress these animosities so administrative and political reform could be achieved. He took the line of Lorraine in suggesting that heresy had sprung up due to the deficiencies of the present church, and that by a reform in that, it might be possible to bring the two congregations back together. He further highlighted the extraordinary circumstances facing the 10 year old Charles, orphaned and in a great deal of debt with much of the royal lands alienated.

The estates general immediately ran into difficulties with the nobility, factions of whom protested that their commissions to meet had been granted by the late François, and that they would require a fresh commission from Charles IX to begin the tasks of the assembly. The queen inquired as to who held this position, asking for a list of names, however none would sign themselves as to holding the view. After some delay, during which the cahiers were handed in by the participating delegates, the estates began their work.

=== Religion ===
On the agenda were matters of justice, religion and finance, with the third estate, whose speaker was an avocat du roi from Bordeaux, presenting their case on the matter of religion first. He demanded a general council, the discipline of the clergy who had fallen into lax morals and vice, the alteration of justice and the removal of tax burden. The third estates orator also advocated for a general pardon for the goings on of Amboise, and the introduction of elections to ensure worthy prelates represented the church. Next up was the orator for the nobility, represented by the sieur de Rochefort. De Rochefort championed the nobility as the prime pillar of the state, arguing the clergy in their wealth were usurping this natural role of the aristocracy, colouring his argument in allusions to the Bible and Herodotus. The nobility further argued that their rights as pillars of the state gave them the ability to choose how they worshipped freely, in the manner of the peace of Augsburg. Quintin represented the first order for the clergy, arguing for prelate election to be left to the clergy, a cease to abuse of the dîme which he asserted had been extorted from the church many times a year and that attacks on church property cease. He further argued that heresy should be suppressed.

One deputy took the position that the Huguenots should be granted churches in which to worship, earning a stinging rebuke from Quintin before Coligny came to his defence.

The estates general as a whole proved unable or unwilling to come to any grand conclusions on religious policy, settling on a pardon for all those accused of involvement in the troubles of the year, without a requirement for any formal recantation. Further ordinances on the matter of religion were passed by the estates on the matter of the election of bishops, which was removed from the king's authority and given to a group of 12 nobleman, commoners and clergy to create. Annates to Rome including the Peter's Pence were to be cancelled, as it was argued these were immiserating the kingdom. A deputy was sent off to Rome to inform the Pope of this decision.

=== Justice and finance ===
Having discussed religion the estates moved on to justice, a matter that proved too thorny for them to handle, as the repurchase of the venal judicial offices by the crown that was desired was too expensive for the crown to currently contemplate. Thus the estates came quickly to the matter of finance. Here some proposed bringing the officers of finance to account for the various alienations of the previous years, however others viewed this unwise, as most of these alienations had gone to influential nobles who it was unwise to anger and they prevailed. Cost cutting was taken up as an alternative, with all gentlemen in the king's household to have their stipends reduced by 50% whilst pensions would be reduced across the board by 33% except for foreign nobles. The Scots guard was to be cut down in size by 200 men. However such measures alone would not provide fiscal stability for the crown, and more drastic means would be required. The great wealth of the church made itself an appropriate target for these efforts, with plans drawn up to requisition church land. The Pope was not entirely opposed to this idea, more fearful as he was of a national church council in France, and eager to buy it off with alienations of church property. On the condition of this, and France maintaining a fleet against the Ottomans it was agreed for a 5-year plan of appropriation taking 360,000 ducats per annum in appropriations.

All this business done, the estates were promptly prorogued by Catherine in February, irritated that on the matter of her regency they were proving hostile.

== Pontoise ==
=== Prior to convening ===
New elections accompanied the reconvening of the estates general at Pontoise, with each bailli sending two representatives, this allowed the crown to judge the relative mood of the representatives to see if it would be more favourable to their agenda. The estates of the Île-de-France region made their oppositional stance known early, pushing for an examination of the accounts of the previous king, a return to the 'ancient constitution' of France and the removal of Catherine de' Medici from the regency. Then the prohibition of any ecclesiastical person from place in the conseil privé and that Navarre be given the regency, with the king's education led by Admiral Coligny and Rochefoucauld. If all their demands were met they promised to relieve the king of his debts.

=== Third estates proposal ===
This troubling auger out of the way, the estates in full assembled. This time the mayor of Autun Bretaigne orated for the third estate. He spoke at length about how decades of war and courtly excess had immiserated the population, leaving them nothing to offer him for his debts except goodwill. Thus he proposed instead the claiming of more church land as a tonic for the crown. This would be a much more aggressive seizure than the deal struck at Orléans however, with Bretaigne proposing the taking of all offices, benefices and dignities that are not officiated in a personal capacity. Further that from benefices that are attended in person an amount on an increasing scale should be taxed of them with a flat rate kept by the clergy after their income exceeded 12000 livres. For monastic orders, the entire income not needed to clothe and feed the monks should be seized. If these measures were insufficient to save the crowns finance Bretaigne proposed direct sale of church property, arguing 26 million livres worth could be raised in such a fashion.

=== The crown's compromise ===
This provocative proposal aroused fury from the Constable Anne de Montmorency who was in attendance, exclaiming the speaker should be hanged. The clergy realising that the crown had few realistic proposals to reach solvency other than through taking from the church offered a counter proposal, arguing that they could award the crown a ten million livres gift, for not taking the third estate's idea. The crown was unsatisfied by this, and after some negotiation, settled on a yearly gift of 1,600,000 livres. This alone would not however be enough to rescue the crown and after several months more negotiation up to the end of the year it was agreed the clergy would purchase back the mortgaged royal domain over the following six years.

With this out of the way the combined estates would prove more amenable to the queen's position on the regency. Despite their earlier mutterings.

== Registration and legacy ==
=== Registration ===
When the Ordinance of Orléans, which embodied the conclusions reached at the estates general, came before the Parlement of Paris to register into law, the Parlement balked. Challenging it both on procedural and constitutional grounds they refused to register it. They first attacked the crown for telling them they didn't need to scrutinise it due to being a subordinate part of the wider estates general themselves. They further critiqued the crown for trying to hurry it through the Parlement by submitting it just before the Parlement broke for summer vacation. These procedural matters through, they moved on to attacking the ordinances on constitutional grounds, highlighting how the ordinance covered clerical matters despite the fact there was a concurrent assembly of bishops debating religious issues. The Parlement argued it was improper to have two assemblies debating the same issues at the same time. In November Michel de l'Hôpital visited the Parlement to chastise them for their insolence, characterising their actions as an illegal usurpation of legislative power. The ordinance would be registered.

=== Legacy ===
The financial obligations regarding the clergy would be poorly enforced. Necessitating a subsequent agreement be made in 1563 and 1567. By 1567 the clergy had successfully finished their 'gifts' and were ready to commence re-purchase of the royal domain. By now though the king desired more, and wanted to continue the yearly payments of 1,600,000. This caused outraged protest from the clergy, as a violation of the Pontoise agreement. The crown persisted regardless, but as a compromise cancelled the 'secular tithe' and allowed the clergy to raise their own taxation for the first time ever. This agreement too would be violated, with the king sequestering 2,000,000 livres arbitrarily in 1572, and engaging in compulsory alienations of church land in 1568 and 1574. The multiple civil wars having kept the crown away from financial stability the crown almost collapsing again from financial strain in 1570 as the third civil war dragged on.

== See also ==
- 1559-1562 French political crisis
- Michel de l'Hôpital
- Colloquy of Poissy
