= Pomponne de Bellièvre =

French statesman

Pomponne de Bellièvre, seigneur de Grignon (1529 – 7 or 9 September 1607) was a French statesman, chancellor of France (1599–1605).

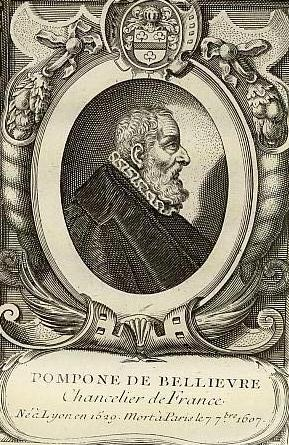
Bellièvre

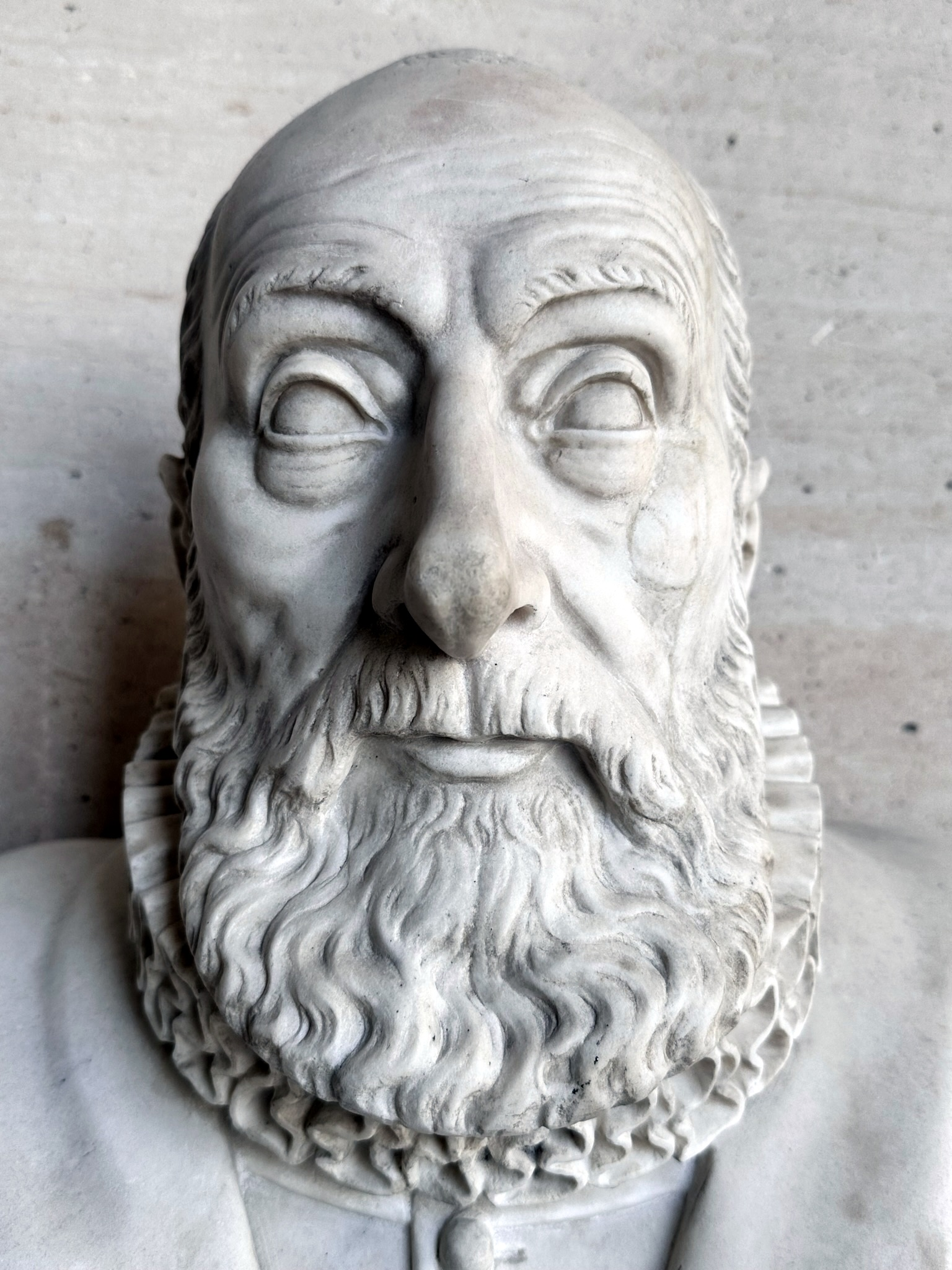
A bust of Pomponne de Bellièvre in the Palace of Versailles

== Life ==
Bellièvre was born in Lyon in 1529.

Between 1575 and 1588, Bellièvre accepted more than a dozen diplomatic missions for King Henry III of France (1551–1589). Sometimes he negotiated with foreign rulers, such as Elizabeth I of England, but more often with domestic antagonists, such as Henry of Navarre and his Huguenots, Henry I, Duke of Guise, and the Catholic Leaguers, and Francis, Duke of Anjou and his allies in the Low Countries. In the course of these missions Bellievre corresponded copiously with Henry III, and Bellievre also discussed them with his ministerial colleagues, often stating frankly to colleagues his discomfort with King Henry's decisions. With the king himself, he expressed his doubts more cautiously.

Pomponne de Bellièvre was sent to London in November 1586 by Henry III and Catherine de' Medici to try to persuade Elizabeth I not to execute Mary, Queen of Scots. Elizabeth rejected the arguments presented by Bellièvre, and insisted that because Mary was in England she was subordinate to her rule and justice.

== Farewell to Henry III ==
As King Henry III lay dying in 1589, Bellièvre pronounced a devastating commentary on the royal master he had served: "If kings are good, we must preserve them; if they are bad, we must endure them. God sends one or the other to punish or console His people."

== Assembly of Notables ==
In 1596, Bellièvre led the charge for the convocation of an Assembly of Notables to address the kingdoms financial problems. The Assembly would largely endorse his program, however in 1597 he quickly found himself supplanted by the baron de Rosny.
