= Nicolas de Pellevé =

French cardinal

His Eminence Nicolas de Pellevé
- Archbishop of Reims
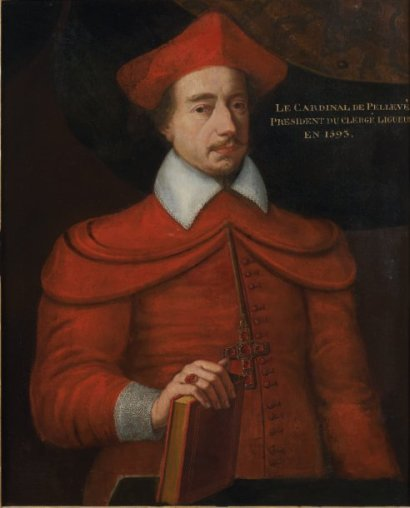
- Church: Catholic Church
- Archdiocese: Reims
- Appointed: 10 May 1591
- Term ended: 24 March 1594
- Predecessor: Louis de Guise
- Successor: Philippe du Bec
- Other posts: Cardinal-Priest of Santi Giovanni e Paolo al Celio (1572-1594)
- Previous posts: Bishop of Amiens (1552-1562); Archbishop of Sens (1562-1592)

Orders
- Created cardinal: 17 May 1570 by Pope Pius V
- Rank: Cardinal-Priest

Personal details
- Born: 18 October 1518 France
- Died: 24 March 1594 (aged 75) Paris, France
- Buried: Reims Cathedral

Nicolas de Pellevé (18 October 1518 – 24 March 1594) was a French archbishop and Cardinal. He was a major figure of the Catholic League.

== Early life ==
Nicolas de Pellevé, the second son of Charles de Pellevé, Sieur de Jouy and Hélène du Fay, was born on 18 October 1518. His brother Robert was Bishop of Pamiers (1553-1579). He obtained the degree of Doctor of Laws from the University of Bourges. With a law degree he obtained an appointment as Councillor of the Parliament of Paris. He then became Master of Requests. He enjoyed the benefice of the Abbey of S. Corneille de Compiègne from 1550 to June 1552, when he was promoted to the Episcopacy.

== Episcopacy ==
He was a courtier of Henry II of France (died 10 July 1559), and then of the Cardinal de Lorraine, Charles de Guise (died 26 December 1574).

He was named bishop of Amiens in 1552 by Henri II, with the patronage of Cardinal Charles de Lorraine-Guise. King Henri died on 10 July 1559. But Bishop Nicolas continued to serve the Monarchy, as an agent of Francis I of France and Mary, Queen of Scots in Scotland from October 1559 to 15 July 1560 during the Scottish Reformation. The famous Calvinist preacher, John Knox, had returned to Scotland from Geneva on 2 May 1559 and had roused the Protestant Lords against the Catholic supporters of the French Mary of Guise, the mother of the six-year-old Mary, Queen of Scots. Pellevé's intervention was unsuccessful, and in any event a Peace (the Treaty of Edinburgh) was worked out between France and Scotland following the death of the Regent Mary of Guise (10 June 1560), which made a military expedition impossible. He returned to France, without having achieved any notable success against the Calvinist supporters of John Knox. As Bishop of Amiens, he accompanied the Cardinal de Lorraine to the Council of Trent in 1562. He was promoted archbishop of Sens in 1562. During his absence in Rome from 1574 until 1592, his diocese was administered for him from 1579 by Christophe de Chéfontaine, titular bishop of Caesarea, former Minister General of the Friars Minor.

== Cardinalate ==
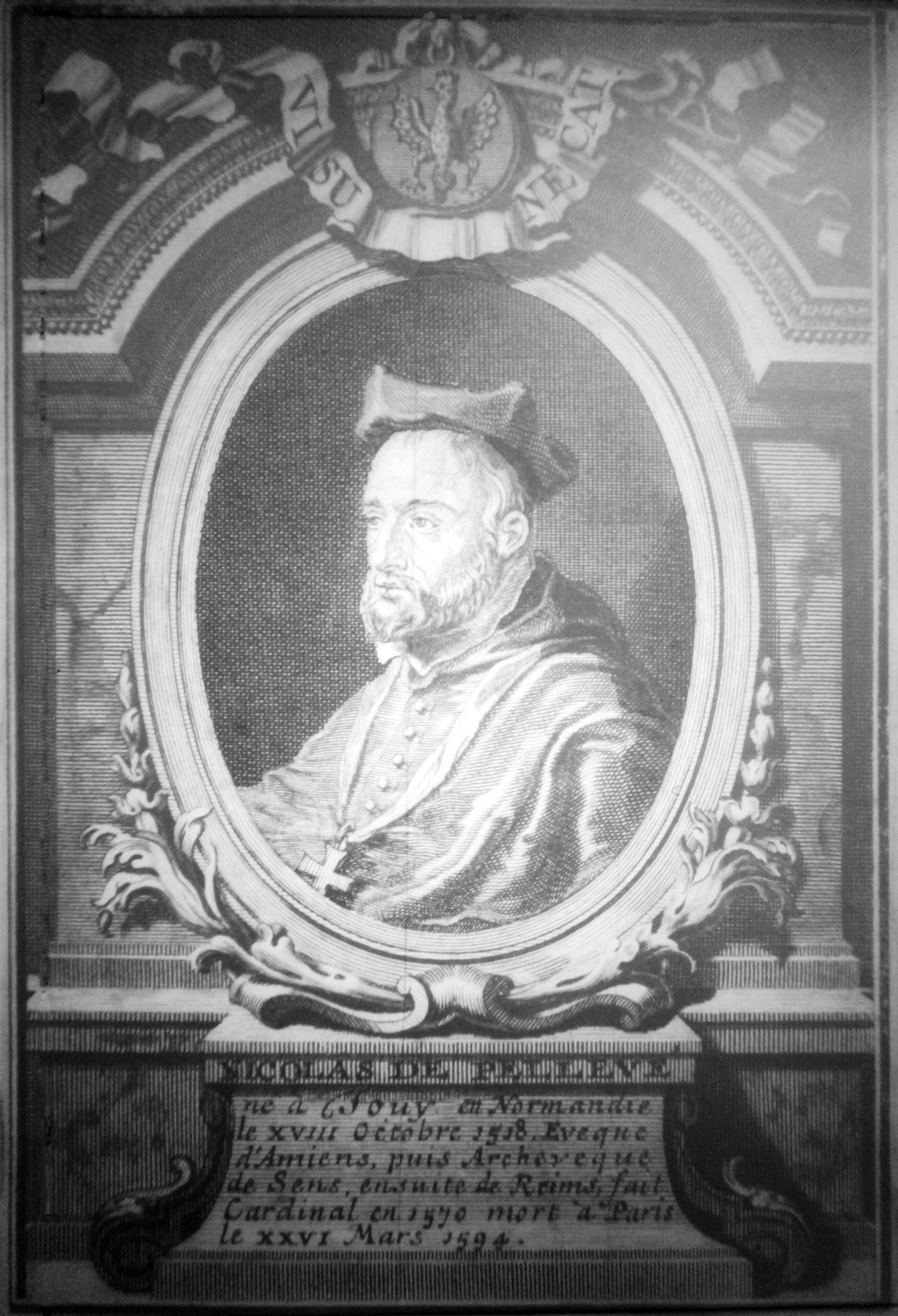
Nicolas Pellevé.

Pellevé was named a Cardinal Priest by Pius V on 17 May 1570 but he did not travel to Rome until summoned to Rome on the death of the Pope on 1 May 1572. The Conclave of 1572 lasted only three days, and he did not arrive in time to participate. The new pope, Gregory XIII, in fact sent a galley to fetch him on 20 June. He received the titulus of SS. John and Paul on 4 July 1572 from Gregory XIII. He remained at the Papal Curia in Rome for the next twenty years, working as the Protector of Scotland and Ireland, as well as a business agent for the King of France, Henri III, at least until the King's excommunication. He was appointed by Gregory XIII to the post of Prefect of the Sacred Congregation of Bishops.

In 1592 Pellevé was named archbishop of Reims by the Pope, without any notification on the part of the King of France, Henri IV. He took possession of the diocese under the mandate of the Duc de Mayenne on 4 October 1593. In 1593 he obtained the benefice of the Abbey of Toronetum (S. Maria de Floregia) in the Diocese of Frejus.

When he returned to France he took up the cause of the Holy League against Henri de Navarre (King Henri IV of France), refusing to recognize an apostate and heretic as legitimate king. In January–August 1593, as First Peer of France, Pellevé was First President for the Clergy of the Estates General (États de la Ligue), summoned to elect a King of France, since the Throne had become vacant (in their view) upon the assassination of Henri III on 2 August 1589. When Henri de Navarre renounced his heresy and apostasy in July 1593, the Cardinal was in a very difficult position politically and the "Estates" in confusion.

His death, in Paris in the Hotel of the Bishops of Sens, on 24 March 1594, removed those difficulties. He was buried in the Church of the Celestines. Four years later the body was removed to Reims, where it was interred in the Cathedral, next to the altar of S. Mary Magdalene.
