= Tanneguy Le Veneur =

Norman noble

- seigneur de Carrouges
- Coat of Arms of the Le Veneur family
- Other titles: Governor of Rouen; Governor of Evreux; Bailli of Rouen; Lieutenant-General of Normandie; Governor of Normandie
- Died: c. 1592; Kingdom of France
- Family: Famille Le Veneur de Tillières
- Father: Jean Le Veneur
- Mother: Gillone de Montjean

Tanneguy Le Veneur, seigneur de Carrouges (-c. 1592) was a Norman noble and governor during the French Wars of Religion. Coming from a family pushed into prominence in the sixteenth century by François I, Carrouges was initially beholden to the House of Guise for political favour, supporting them in their plans concerning Scotland and arrests related to the Conspiracy of Amboise. By 1563 however he had begun to secure notable office in Normandie, becoming lieutenant-general with authority over Rouen and Evreux in 1563, then bailli of Rouen in 1565. He tried to maintain peace in the important city, but struggled from 1567-1572 to contain the violent radicalism in the city. After the Massacre of Saint Bartholomew left the Protestant population of the city significantly reduced, he found his responsibilities more peaceful for a while. In 1575 he was elevated to one of the governors of Normandie, after the province was split in three on the death of the Duke of Bouillon.

In the wake of the Peace of Monsieur the first ligue movement spread in Rouen, Carrouges dutifully followed the king when he took over the movement and promulgated an official version, abiding by the royal lines. He found little enthusiasm for this formulation among the elite bodies of the city, and struggled to get the Parlement or Cathedral chapter to come on board with the ligue. With the Treaty of Bergerac in 1577 the ligue went dormant, its demands largely met. By 1583 Henri III had new favourites he wished to please, and as such he sought to reconsolidate the governorship of Normandie, necessitating the compensation of Carrouges, Matigon and Meilleraye. Carrouges was bought out of his governorship for 60,000 livres, a return to lieutenant general and a promise his son would inherit his lieutenant-generalcy. The death of Alençon in 1584 left the heir to the throne as a Protestant, causing a second much stronger wave of ligue activity in France. Carrouges wrote with great concern of the widespread support for the ligue in his districts, and the various efforts he was undertaking to contain them.

By 1588 royal authority was in tatters and the king was exiled from Paris after the Day of the Barricades. Desperate to secure the loyalty of Rouen due to its strategic location, he and the ligue in Paris competed for the cities loyalty in frantic negotiations. After considerable effort and concessions, Carrouges and the premier président of the Parlement were able to secure the city for Henri, and he entered in June. In return for his loyalty, Carrouges was promised the office of Marshal when a vacancy arose in the future. By the end of the year the king had irrevocably broken his authority in Rouen through his assassination of the duke of Guise, while Carrouges continued to try and contain the liguer sentiments in the town, they burst into a coup in February 1589 that secured the city for the ligue. After a brief attempt to co-opt the movement in February, Carrouges was ousted in March by Charles, Duke of Mayenne, his authority in Rouen in tatters. He died in 1592.

== Early life and family ==
The Veneur family traced its noble origins back to the fourteenth century. They had languished in obscurity until the reign of François I during which time the favour shown by the king to Jehan Le Veneur, making him a cardinal, brought the family to prominence in Norman society. The family had tied itself to the Annebault and Brézé, two Norman families that were leaders in the national scene. By Tanneguy's day the family was connected to the Guise through marriage though Tanneguy did not consider himself a client of the Guise. Tanneguy was the son of Jean II Le Veneur and Gillone de Montjean.

In 1550 he married Madeleine de Pompadour and together they had four children:

- Jacques Le Veneur, comte de Tillières (d. 1596)
- Charles Le Veneur, seigneur du Homme
- Marie Le Veneur
- Diane Le Veneur

== Reign of François II ==
In 1559 the Guise family, which was ascendent, had considerable ambitions as related to Scotland, to this end they needed to organise an expedition in Normandie to travel up to the kingdom. They lacked however a noble in the province who had both their trust and the necessary offices to execute their vision. Regardless the relatively minor Carrouges and the bishop of Evreux were dispatched to England as an embassy in September. Ultimately the Scottish plan would be under the authority of René, Marquis of Elbeuf, a brother of the duke of Guise, however national events in the following year would ensure the failure of the scheme. Trusted by the Guise, Carrouges was entrusted with the sensitive task of arresting the Prince of Condé's mother-in-law, after their suspected involvement in the Conspiracy of Amboise.

== Reign of Charles IX ==
=== Entry to high office ===
Carrouges had first held authority in Rouen as lieutenant to Brissac, establishing himself over the town in 1563 as lieutenant-general of Rouen and Evreux whilst the duke of Bouillon was still overall governor of Normandie. He was trusted to quell the dispute between Marshal Vielleville and Villebon d'Estouteville that had erupted in the town, Villebon's death in 1565, Carrouges was granted his office of bailli of Rouen. Having now achieved high office, he cultivated connections at court at the expense of his previous Guisard loyalties that he had demonstrated during the reign of François II.

=== Keeping the peace ===
He proved effective at maintaining the peace in the town at first, however the fragile equilibrium he constructed was shattered by national events in 1567. Rouen was plagued by disturbances in 1567 and 1568, in reporting to the crown on the matter in early 1568, Carrouges blamed the 'haughty attitudes' and 'insolent words' of the towns Protestant population, as being inducements to violent action. In the wake of the Peace of Longjumeau Catholic militants engaged in several days of rioting in the town, clashing with Carrouges city guards. He sent increasingly desperate pleas to the crown for royal troops to reinforce his garrison, the crown finally assenting in May. News that royal troops would be coming set off further violence with rumours that the troops would be Protestant and Carrouges was besieged in his residence until he promised that the troops would not be allowed entry into Rouen. The conseillers-échevins for their part were threatened by the crown with royal displeasure if they did not reverse Carrouges decision. Eventually in June the troops were admitted under cover of darkness and the town was brought back into order.

=== Relations ===
As governor with authority over Rouen, Carrouges was usually able to work in concert with the administrative bodies of his town, in contrast to some governors such as Guillaume de Joyeuse who often found themselves at war with the town councils in their governorships. He formed his own affinity in the town, ensuring men loyal to him monopolised military offices and sending out loyal men to positions in nearby faubourgs. With the increasing prominence of the king's brother Alençon in Normandie after 1570, Carrouges and Matignon were increasingly jumpy that he represented an impingement on their authority as lieutenant-generals. Catherine had to write reassuringly to the men telling them Alençon only had authority over his appanage. Alongside complaints about Alençon, Carrouges frequently wrote complaints about money to the crown, these were often fairly disconnected from his actual financial position.

=== Massacre ===
As word of the Massacre that was unfolding in the capital trickled into Rouen, Carrouges had little interest in being the mechanism by which it was propagated in his city. He was keen to follow the letter he had received from Charles IX on 24 August bemoaning a 'great and terrible sedition' that was underway in the capital and instructing him to make sure the peace was kept in every municipality under his authority. Anyone who caused disturbances or took up arms was to be sentenced to death. He was however instructed to depart from the town, to inspect various other regions under his authority and ensure order was maintained in the countryside. In his absence militant Catholics seized control of the city from the municipal authorities and butchered several hundred of the towns Protestant population. With this heavy blow to the Protestant movement in Rouen, many other Protestants abjured or fled in the coming months, leaving the city far quieter in terms of disturbances over the coming years.

== Reign of Henri III ==
=== Elevation to governor ===
In 1575, the death of the duke of Bouillon left the governorship of Normandie vacant. Little desiring a potentially threatening magnate to control this key office, the crown decided to divide the governorship into three and elevate the lieutenant generals Carrouges, Jean de Moy, seigneur de Meilleraye and Jacques II de Goyon seigneur de Matignon into governors. Buoyed by the increased authority of being made governor, Meilleraye and Carrouges supplemented the size of their companies in Normandie, until they rivalled those of the national grandees in the region.

=== Catholic ligue ===
Early in 1576, Carrouges reported to the crown that a noble ligue had formed inside his governorship centred on Rouen, no details of this ligue survive. Rumours of armed bands led to the crown informing Carrouges to be on the watch for a potential attack on Rouen in August 1576, however none materialised. A more famous ligue would be formed by Jacques d'Humières in Péronne later that year in response to the Peace of Monsieur, which radical Catholics loathed for giving too much to the Protestants. Hoping to co-opt the movement, which quickly spread out from Péronne into a national movement, Henri tried to usurp leadership. Declaring himself to be the head of the ligue as 'no one is more Catholic than I' he modified the ligue to suit his needs and sent out an oath for all provincial governors and representatives to swear with their subordinates. Some governors, such as Meilleraye were not happy with the provisions in the king's ligue that protected Protestants or removed the decentralised electoral aspects; and modified the oath, forming illegal ligues in response. Carrouges for his part was happy with the king's formulation, and he and his subordinates swore an unmodified version of the 18 articles provided by the king. Carrouges found little enthusiasm for the project among the notables of Rouen, who largely saw the project as a ploy by the king to extract tax income, the cathedral chapter stalled for a month before joining despite pressure exerted by Carrouges, Meilleraye and Cardinal Bourbon. The Parlement and conseillers-échevins meanwhile balked entirely and did not join this ligue. The ligue elite in the province sought to elevate Pierre de Roncherolles to overall maître de camp of the ligue forces in Normandie. Carrouges was successfully brought on board with this project, however Matignon was uninterested, having already appointed his own man to the post in lower Normandie. The king for his part refused to overrule Matignon and enforce a singular maître de camp.

=== Demotion ===
By 1583 the crown was tired of the split Normandie, desiring to reconsolidate the governorship, so that it might be given to the king's favourite Anne de Joyeuse. To this end it was necessary to buy out or otherwise compensate the three governors of the region. Carrouges was bought out of his share with a gift of 60,000 livres and returned to his previous position as one of the lieutenant-generals of Normandie. He secured a further concession that his son would inherit his lieutenant-generalship on his death. Carrouges and Jacques de Moy, seigneur de Pierrecourt wrote with concern in 1586 about the increased authority of François d'O who had recently passed the town of Caen over to a client of his. Henri and Catherine responded desperately that they would not diminish either of the families authority without a just recompense.

=== Second ligue ===
With the death of Alençon in 1584, creating the prospect of a Protestant heir to the throne, the ligue movement, which had been dormant since the Treaty of Bergerac quelled the grievances caused by the peace of Monsieur, roared back to life. No longer headed by the king, this movement found far more popular support in Rouen. Carrouges wrote to the king in April 1585 that the majority of the population had liguer sympathies, the Parlement was described as having many ligue aligned deputies, while the 'Council of Twenty Four' was more resistant to ligue impulses. Carrouges suspecting the Spanish in the city had a role in fomenting ligue activities, planned to remove them from the town, but was talked down from such a step by the cities merchants who informed him of their importance to the economy, and peripheral involvement in politics. Regardless Carrouges decided to impose a 6pm curfew on non naturalised residents, he also supplemented the city guard and implemented searches on inbound ships to locate any weapons. Henri, decided further security was required, and that the correct solution would be to introduce a garrison commanded by Joyeuse. The urban authorities reacted with horror to this proposal and incessantly requested the king back down, which he eventually did. Joyeuse came to the city alone.

After the Day of the Barricades Henri was exiled from Paris and increasingly conscious that his authority was in tatters. From his exile in Chartres he took Rouen to be a priority for its strategic location between the capital and the channel. He and the liguers in Paris now competed for Rouens affections each trying to present their side of the events in Paris. Henri offered material concessions to the city, with the repeal of several recent taxes, meanwhile his ally in the city Carrouges worked to ensure the city would be loyal and allow him entry. Carrouges and the Parlementaire Claude Groulart worked on the Council of 24 trying to coax them into siding with the king. Their efforts bore fruit and in June the council wrote to the king thanking him for his generosity and inviting him to visit. He entered several days later to cheers from the populace. Over the next month the city entertained him, and he made public acts of Catholic devotion, heading to mass on foot. For Carrouges' loyalty he was to be rewarded with a spot as a Marshal of France when a vacancy opened up in the institution, his son was not so loyal and was drawn increasingly into ligue activities in the town.

=== Collapse of royal authority ===
Formal loyalty to the crown was maintained in Rouen until after the murder of the duke of Guise by the king, after which point, Carrouges found it impossible to continue the cities obedience to the crown. Carrouges would however attempt to do so, as soon as news reached Rouen he sprung into action, stationing spies throughout the city to alert him to dangerous developments in public opinion, exiled and disarmed former Protestants who were now Catholic and banning preachers from mentioning the assassination. While Carrouges was working against the ligue he would also not allow royal troops into the city, very conscious that this would be explosive. By 29 December his ban against mentioning the assassination in sermons was violated, opening the floodgates. On 14 January he was called before the Council of 24 and accused of conspiring to allow royal troops to enter the town, a charge he successfully denied. On 7 February 1589, a Liguer coup seized the city, as had happened in Paris. Carrouges who was held up in the Abbey of St Ouen was persuaded to hand over control of the two royal strongholds by the ligue leadership to avoid any bloodshed. The ligue movement established a 'holy council' of 12 notables to administer the town. Carrouges, though in opposition to the ligue movement was not keen to be outflanked, he declared for the ligue on 10 February and established a new council with himself at its head, swearing to uphold the ligue's tenets, few were convinced that the stalwart royalist was a sincere liguer. This new arrangement was equally ephemeral however as Carrouges and the liguer notables struggled to work together. On 4 March 1589 Charles, Duke of Mayenne came to the town, hoping to establish a more complete ligue authority. To this end he declared a ligue council with authority over the entirety of Normandie. He placed at its head the governor of upper Normandy Meilleraye, and his brother Pierrecourt, Carrouges for his part left the town. In 1590 Mayenne installed Jean de Saulx Tavannes into the position, but the notables of Rouen worked poorly with him, and he in turn was replaced by Villars in 1591.

== Sources ==
- Baird, Henry (1880). History of the Rise of the Huguenots: Vol 2 of 2. Hodder & Stoughton.
- Benedict, Philip (2003). Rouen during the Wars of Religion. Cambridge University Press.
- Carroll, Stuart (2005). Noble Power during the French Wars of Religion: The Guise Affinity and the Catholic Cause in Normandy. Cambridge University Press.
- Harding, Robert (1978). Anatomy of a Power Elite: the Provincial Governors in Early Modern France. Yale University Press.
- Holt, Mack P. (2005). The French Wars of Religion, 1562-1629. Cambridge University Press.
- Jouanna, Arlette (1998). Histoire et Dictionnaire des Guerres de Religion. Bouquins.
