= Jacques d'Humières =

French military governor

- marquis d'Encre
- Jacques d'Humières' coat of arms
- Other titles: Governor of Péronne, Montdidier and Roye, Lieutenant-General of Picardie
- Born: c. 1520; Kingdom of France
- Died: c. 1579; Kingdom of France
- Family: Maison d'Humières
- Father: Jean II d'Humières

Jacques d'Humières, marquis d'Encre (c. 1520-c. 1579) was a military governor and lieutenant-general during the French Wars of Religion. Coming from a prominent Picard family, Humières succeeded his brother Louis to the governorship of Péronne, Montdidier and Roye in 1560 upon the latter's death. In the following year the province came under the domination of the House of Bourbon-Vendôme with Louis, Prince of Condé's ascent to governor. Humières was not among Condé's Protestant supporters, but succeeded to the office of lieutenant-general of Picardie in 1568 as Condé declined from favour. This gave him the authority of governor over the province in the absence of the governor.

By 1576 the crown had recently concluded the fifth war of religion with the Peace of Monsieur, this peace offered generous terms to the Protestants of the kingdom, in the hopes of sating the king's brother François, Duke of Alençon who had aligned himself against the crown. The provisions of this peace, in particular that granting Picardie's governorship and the town of Péronne to Henri, Prince of Condé as surety to confirm the peace outraged many militant Catholics in Picardie.

Pressured by his subordinates Humières put himself at the head of a Ligue in opposition to this policy, a group of Picard nobles and urban elites swearing an oath and terms to oppose the appointment. This organisation began to spread, its Catholic character increasingly coming to the fore as it reconfigured into an anti-Protestant national Ligue with the Duke of Guise outlining what he believed the Ligue should be. Alarmed by the rapid spread Henri III sought to stem its growth by co-opting it, putting himself at the head of a national Ligue and then making all provincial leaders swear not to form any rival ligues. Humières who had by now converted from a reluctant leader to a committed one oversaw the refusal of entry to Condé's garrison, forcing the king to back down and offer him an alternate surety town. Meanwhile the Estates General of 1576 called as a term of the peace was dominated by Ligue deputies who pushed for the resumption of war. Unable to overturn their decision Henri resumed the wars of religion. Meanwhile Humières and the other ligue leaders were losing heart in the king's commitment to the project, and began communicating and organising with each other secretly. Nevertheless their success was beginning to collapse, struggling for funds and with rumours of peace increasingly swirling by May 1577. The Peace of Bergerac in 1577 neutralised the Ligue, offering stricter terms for the toleration of Protestantism and outlawing all ligues. Henri courted Humières loyalty, offering him a prime place in his new Order of the Holy Spirit in 1579, the same year he died.

== Early life and family ==
Jacques d'Humières was the son of Jean II d'Humières. Jean was governor of Péronne and a military captain in the later Italian Wars, commanding the dauphin's lance company until he was of age. He was also at times lieutenant-general of Dauphiné, Savoy and Piedmont. His family had long had disputes with the house of Bourbon-Vendôme.

In 1561, his sister Léonore married Guillaume de Montmorency-Thoré, the fifth son of Anne de Montmorency.

== Reign of François II ==
During 1560, Humières was elevated to the role of 'gentleman of the chamber' a reasonably prestigious role at the court. In November 1560, Humières' brother Louis died, and he succeeded him as governor of Péronne, Montdidier and Roye.

== Reign of Charles IX ==
In 1561 the recently freed from jail Louis, Prince of Condé of the Bourbon-Vendôme, with whom Humières had considerable disagreement was granted the governorship of Picardie. Condé set about elevating the Protestant nobility of the region, governing through Jean de Monchy, sieur de Senaport as his lieutenant-general. In 1568 however Humières would ascend to this key role.

Anjou, brother to king Charles IX wrote to Humières in his capacity as lieutenant-general of Picardie, shortly after the resumption of hostilities in September 1568. In his letter he decried the disobedience of the Protestants and urged him to suppress any disorders that emerged in his governate. At this time he became a chevalier de Ordre de Saint-Michel being knighted by his predecessor as lieutenant-general. He was further granted independence from the authority of the governor of the province, on the grounds that Péronne had only been subordinated to Picardie with the elevated of a former governor of Péronne to overall governor.

== Reign of Henri III ==
=== Feud ===
Humières served, both as lieutenant-general of Picardie at large, granting him the powers of governor during the governors absences, and simultaneously as de jure governor of the towns of Péronne, Montdidier and Roye. In the 1570s he found himself locked in a bitter dispute with Guillaume de Montmorency-Thoré and lacking the influence at court to prosecute it.

=== Ligue of Péronne ===
The Peace of Monsieur which brought the fifth war of religion to a close provided the most generous terms of the period to the Protestants. This frustrated many radical Catholics who did not feel like they had lost a war. Opposition was most fierce in the northern regions of Normandie and Picardie, where local Protestantism had been most decimated by the Saint Bartholomews Day Massacre. In opposition to the terms generally, and a clause that granted Henri, Prince of Condé the governorship of Picardie and the town of Péronne specifically, Humières, who governed Péronne refused to yield his post and begged the king not to allow his city to have a Protestant garrison at the urgings of his subordinates. To oppose Condé in any efforts to take the office, Humières formed a Ligue of Picard nobles in defence of his possession of the town, in total securing the support of around 150 in the province, several of whom were prominent Guise clients. Most prominent among these were Michel d'Estourmel and Jacques d'Happlaincourt who were indeed the initial drivers of the ligue, with Humières a reluctant figurehead. The ligue spread first to other Picard towns, finding support in Saint-Quentin, Beauvais and Corbie, alongside the other towns under Humiėres authority Montdidier and Roye. Applaincourt had travelled to Abbeville to proselytise the ligue message, while the sieur de Sainte-Marie travelled to Amiens. In the first month of its existence the ligue of Péronne imposed 240,000 livres in taxation and established an army of 3000.

=== Compromise ===
When Condé's garrison arrived, it was refused entry into the town, Henri wrote bitterly to Bellièvre on the situation, meanwhile money was flowing into Péronne from the towns that supported Humières' manifesto. Faced with intransigence from Péronne, the king was forced to rescind his promise to Condé, offering him Saint-Jean-d'Angély or Cognac as replacement towns for him. Concurrently he urged on the national level for all righteous Catholics to form a broader Christian union against heresy. As the ligue spread across France, modelled on the oath and declaration Humières' ligue had taken in June, king Henri denounced Humières, urging him to abide by the terms of the peace, highlighting Péronne's status as a border town, suggesting his actions might be taken advantage of by the Spanish. He highlighted to Humières that he had selected a Catholic as the towns leading local authority and that the garrison would not pillage as they would be well paid. He went on to demand of Humières that he expel Applaincourt and Estourmel from the town, seeing them as the leading influences in this movement. Humières ignored the king's pleas. Meanwhile the duke of Guise gravitated to the movement and set out what he believed were its principles.

=== Co-option ===
The king, seeking to control the dangerous movement that was spreading across France declared that no one was a better Catholic than himself, and thus put himself at the head of the ligue. As head of the ligue every provincial governor and lieutenant-general received a 'formula of association', the terms were a disappointment to the radicals. All other ligues except for the kings were outlawed and Protestantism was not banned. In the following months after having called the ligue dominated Estates General of 1576, he was compelled to break off the Peace of Monsieur and resume the civil wars. In February 1577 he wrote frustratedly to Humières again, complaining that he had altered the oath of the ligue to make it answerable to the estates general instead of the king. Despite the king's theoretical leadership of the ligue its provincial leaders Jean de Moy and Humières corresponded in secret using ciphered letters. They bemoaned the failure to secure the loyalty of various towns, such as Amiens, the increasing prospect of peace and the difficulty with raising funds for an army. Indeed when Humières had tried to stage an entry into Amiens he had been refused entry and the king rewarded the town with a large bribe of 8000 livres. In May they met to plan out a letter to the king, urging him against making peace.

=== Bergerac ===
The Peace of Bergerac that brought this war to a close in September 1577 would be fairly similar to the Peace of Monsieur, however Protestant worship was limited to towns under their control and one town per baillage elsewhere, Humières Ligue, and all potential others in France were banned. While elements of the ligue would limp on under the leadership of Maineville, the organisation was largely dormant until the death of the king's brother Alençon put the Protestant Navarre first in line for the succession.

Hoping to buy his loyalty, Humières was included among the first intake for Henri's new Order of the Holy Spirit, to replace the diluted Order of Saint-Michel in 1579, he died the same year in March.

== Sources ==
- Baumgartner, Frederic (1988). Henry II: King of France 1547–1559. Duke University Press.
- Carroll, Stuart (2005). Noble Power during the French Wars of Religion: The Guise Affinity and the Catholic Cause in Normandy. Cambridge University Press.
- Carroll, Stuart (2009). Martyrs and Murderers: The Guise Family and the Making of Europe. Oxford University Press.
- Durot, Éric (2012). François de Lorraine, duc de Guise entre Dieu et le Roi. Classiques Garnier.
- Harding, Robert (1978). Anatomy of a Power Elite: the Provincial Governors in Early Modern France. Yale University Press.
- Jouanna, Arlette (1998). Histoire et Dictionnaire des Guerres de Religion. Bouquins.
- Knecht, Robert (1994). Renaissance Warrior and Patron: The Reign of Francis I. Cambridge University Press.
- Knecht, Robert (2014). Catherine de' Medici. Routledge.
- Knecht, Robert (2010). The French Wars of Religion, 1559-1598. Routledge.
- Knecht, Robert (2016). Hero or Tyrant? Henry III, King of France, 1574-1589. Routledge.
- Potter, David (1993). War and Government in the French Provinces: Picardy 1470-1560. Cambridge University Press.
- Salmon, J.H.M (1975). Society in Crisis: France during the Sixteenth Century. Metheun & Co.
- Sutherland, Nicola (1980). The Huguenot Struggle for Recognition. Yale University Press.
