= Jean de Moy =

Norman leader

- seigneur de La Meilleraye
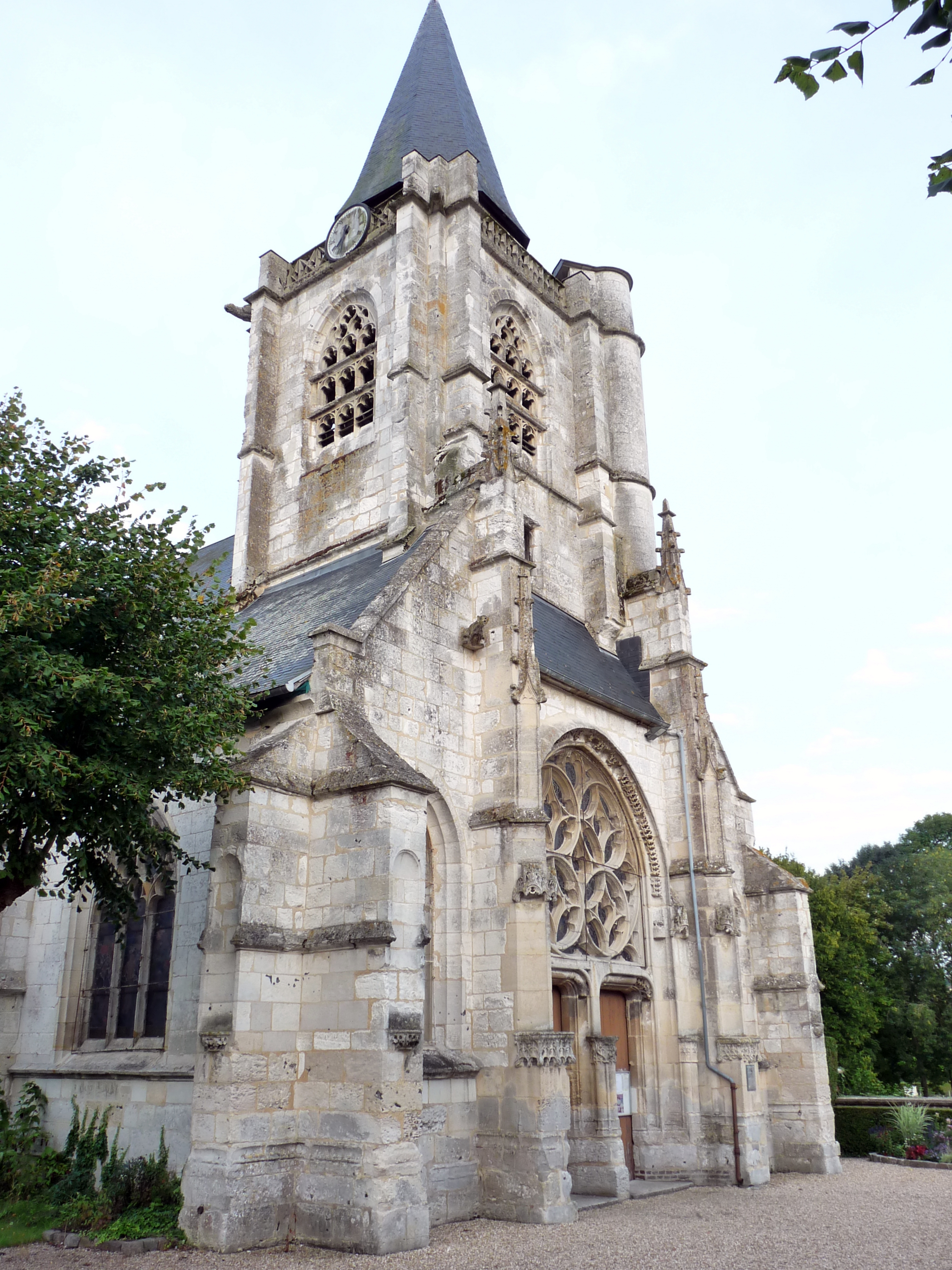
- Church of the settlement of La Meilleraye-sur-Seine, from which Jean derived his title
- Other titles: Lieutenant-General of Upper Normandie; Governor of Upper Normandie; Governor of Pont-l'Évêque
- Born: c. 1528; Kingdom of France
- Died: October 1591; Kingdom of France
- Family: House of Moy
- Father: Charles de Moy
- Mother: Charlotte de Dreux

Jean de Moy, seigneur de La Meilleraye (c. 1528-October 1591) was a member of an influential Norman noble family, lieutenant-general and governor during the French Wars of Religion. Son of Charles de Moy, La Meilleraye was denied the potential inheritance of the governorship of the key port town of Le Havre in favour of the House of Montmorency. With historic family ties to the house of Bourbon-Vendôme he joined Louis Prince of Condé in his rebellion during the first war of religion in 1562, travelling with him to Orléans. He proved more opportunist however and his loyalty to the crown was bought back in June with the provision of several Norman towns from Claude, Duke of Aumale, he fought for the crown in the war and was further rewarded the next year with the lieutenant-generalcy of Upper Normandy and his fathers' post of vice-admiral.

During the second civil war he tried and failed to secure Dieppe for the crown, engaging in brutal reprisals when he was eventually able to bring the town to order. In the subsequent civil war he again fought attempts by Protestants to secure Dieppe and Le Havre, but more successfully, having a prominent member of a rival Norman family executed for treason.

In 1574 the current governor of Normandie Henri-Robert de la Marck who had long had little influence on the province died. Henri III of France hoping to dilute the influence of any one noble on the province, elevated the three lieutenant generals; La Meilleraye, Tanneguy le Veneur, seigneur de Carrouges and Jacques II de Goyon, seigneur de Matignon to co-equal governors, fracturing the province. With the conclusion of the fifth war of religion in 1576 with the Protestant favoured Peace of Monsieur, La Meilleraye joined other Catholic nobles in indicating their disgust. La Meilleraye followed Jacques d'Humières lead in Picardie, becoming head of the Catholic Ligue in Normandie. After the causes co-option by the crown, La Meilleraye was disheartened by the king's version of the ligue that he and his subordinates were expected to subscribe to. He, alongside Humières abandoned the official ligue, operating covertly with a modified version that maintained the decentralised 'democratic' spirit of the original, with elections for all major ligue offices, and further removed the clause that protected Protestants. While he, Humières and other ligue leaders would oppose the establishment of a new peace the following year, the Treaty of Bergerac successfully neutralised much of the Ligue grievances through its harsher terms, and the ligue faded.

Returned to loyalty he and his familial network were keen supporters of the Duke of Guise's plans for an invasion of Scotland to restore Catholic control of the kingdom. In 1583 Henri, dissauded from the experiment in Normandie to split the governate decided to reunify the office, and provide it to his favourite Anne de Joyeuse. La Meilleraye was bought off in return for 60,000 livres, but found himself disappointed in Joyeuse's governorship, alienating him from the crown. However this period of internal peace would be brought to an end with the death of the king's brother Alençon's death in 1584 which defaulted the succession to Navarre. Horrified that a Protestant might become king, La Meilleraye's relatives assisted in expelling the king from the capital during the Day of the Barricades, La Meilleraye meanwhile offered limited support to the new ligue though his age was beginning to limit his abilities. Though elevated through the 'Holy Council' set up by Charles, Duke of Aumale to the height of his power in Upper Normandy, he was by this point unable to sign documents. With his death in 1591 shortly to be followed by that of his brother Pierrecourt and preceded by that of his cousin, his families influence in Normandie would collapse.

== Early life and family ==
Jean de Moy was born in 1528, the son of Charles de Moy, governor of Le Havre and vice admiral of the kingdom. His mother was Charlotte de Dreux member of an influential family of Norman nobility. His brother Jacques de Moy was seigneur de Pierrecourt. Meanwhile his cousins Nicholas, Louis and François controlled the lordships of Riberpré, Gomméron and Richebourg respectively. While Charles hoped to resign his governorship in favour of his son Jean, the Montmorency intervened to see his office transfer to Gaspard II de Coligny, Anne de Montmorency's nephew. The hostility of the Montmorency to the family pushed them into the orbit of the Guise for patronage and favour, though they also had longer term ties to the Bourbon-Vendôme.

== Reign of Charles IX ==
=== Defection ===
In 1562 he aligned himself with the Protestant Louis, Prince of Condé at the outbreak of the first war of religion. After the Massacre of Wassy in March 1562, he accompanied Condé in his seizure of Orléans as a headquarter for a rebellion. From the recently captured city Condé would promulgate his manifesto alongside the Protestant nobility that had joined him. By July he had switched sides, receiving the governorship of Honfleur, Lisieux and Pont-Audemer in return for his defection from Claude, Duke of Aumale. In September he was further rewarded with the position of vice-admiral for Normandie. He was an enthusiastic convert to his new Catholic patrons, striking out at Gabriel de Lorges, Count of Montgommery when he attempted to manoeveur his forces in early September, engaging him near Dives-sur-Mer.

=== Reward ===
At this time he already held great influence in Normandie as governor of Pont-l'Évêque and an assortment of other towns. The following year in July 1563 he was made one of the Lieutenant-Generals of Normandie. Now in higher office he distributed the captaincies of Honfleur, Liseux and other towns to his clients.

=== Second civil war ===
During the second civil war he attempted, in alliance with the captain of Dieppe, to prevent a Protestant seizure of the town. He was unsuccessful in this effort and the townsfolk overwhelmed the garrison and delivered the town to the Protestant rebels. When at last order was restored in the town, La Meilleraye angrily enforced his vengeance on the town, billeting troops in Protestant homes, burning down other homes of prominent Protestants and putting a punitive tax of 16000 livres on the settlement. After the Peace of Longjumeau the Catholics of Dieppe lobbied him to proscribe Protestant worship in their town. He responded eagerly to this opportunity to prove his Catholic credentials and punish the town, representing their case to the crown.

Through the late 1560s the problems of raising revenue became increasingly acute for La Meilleraye. Faced with increased demands from the crown that he could not meet, he asked for more privileges so that he could acquire the funds, such as being allowed to raise his own salt tax through his post as vice admiral. Despite his pleas of poverty to the court, the money he raised from seizing Protestant property after the Edict of Saint-Maur allowed him to invest several thousand livres in new land holdings.

=== Third civil war ===
During the third civil war he again worked to counteract Protestant attempts to seize the towns of Le Havre and Dieppe, a project he undertook with ruthlessness. He broke up Protestant conspiracies in both towns, implicating François de Bacqueville-Martel, seigneur de Lindbouef, a former friend of La Meilleraye's and influential power broker in Matignon's jurisdiction. Charging Lindbouef with treason the beleaguered noble, counting on his old friend to exonerate him pleaded his case before the Parlement of Rouen. Regardless he was executed in March 1569, La Meilleraye having sacrificed his friend to burnish his ultra Catholic credentials and weaken a potential rival family for control of Normandie.

Due to his influence over the Pays de Caux, the disgruntled canons of Lillebonne came to him to appeal, after Admiral Coligny reintroduced Protestant worship to a chapel in the community with the 1570 Peace of Saint-Germain-en-Laye that brought the third war of religion to a close. Increasingly confident in his own power when the king ordered him to vacate his ordinance company from Normandie in 1570, La Meilleraye simply ignored him.

== Reign of Henri III ==
=== Governor ===
Henri-Robert de la Marck who had technically held the authority of governor of Normandie, died in 1574. The crown decided that they did not wish for this province to be controlled by a single man going forward. As such the three lieutenant-generals of the region were elevated to co-equal governors. La Meilleraye, Carrouges and Matignon divided the province up between themselves on the lines of their former authorities. Carrouges and La Meilleraye complained that Matignon received more favourable treatment from the crown than they did, but nothing came of it. To distinguish himself from his two rival lieutenant-generals he adopted a more militant and extreme Catholicism than either of them. Throughout the 1570s La Meilleraye and his colleagues supplemented the size of their companies, until they were larger than those of the magnate grandees such as Claude, Duke of Aumale.

=== Ligue ===
As the Ligue founded by Jacques d'Humières in Péronne spread into Normandie, La Meilleraye was an eager adopter of the cause. Provided the official royal ligue declaration that he was to swear with his subordinates after Henri III co-opted the project he adapted the provided text. Having convoked an assembly of notables in Caux and Gisors they swore a version that was in line with Henri's for the first eight of eighteen articles. However from here the oath was altered. La Meilleraye removed the clauses that protected the livelihoods of Protestants, he further adapted the intended political structure. La Meilleraye would be the leader of the Ligue in his region, not by virtue of his governorship, as was the intent, but rather the fact the deputies of the ligue had elected him. His subordinates would also be elected. A provision ensured that if either he or his subordinates deviated from proper Catholicism, that they could be removed from office and new candidates elected. This elected structure extended beyond the ligues administration into its military wing, with the ligue commanders also facing election.

This version of the ligue was radically different to the official one the crown had promulgated and was thus illegal, given Henri had outlawed all other ligues. As such, La Meilleraye and his subordinates organised it in secret. To continue his coordination with Humières, Pierre de Ronchorolles acted as an intermediary between the two liguers. In La Meilleraye's absence Roncherolles attended a council meeting at Abbeville in April to discuss the failure to bring Amiens into the fold. In May Humières and La Meilleraye met in person to discuss drawing up a letter to the king in opposition to the rumours of peace that were now swirling the court. La Meilleraye hoped to have Roncherolles appointed as maître de camp for all ligue forces in Normandie, to this end he secured the endorsement of his fellow governor Carrouges, however his rival Matignon interfered with this plan, having appointed his own man in lower Normandie. The king for his part rejected La Meilleraye's proposal for a unified maître de camp fearing it would pass too much power to him.

=== Long peace ===
With peace declared in less favourable terms to the Protestants in the Treaty of Bergerac, the ligue movement fizzled out, both due to the lack of inciting cause, and due to the banning of all ligues as a term of the peace. Roncherolles brother François de Roncherolles seigneur de Maineville continued a die hard faction that did not dissolve.

With plans to invade Scotland in favour of restoring Catholicism in the territory, Guise who hoped to lead such a project spent a great deal of time in Normandie planning during 1581. He found himself in regular correspondence with La Meilleraye, who in his position as vice-admiral of Normandie would be of critical importance to such a venture. A meeting was arranged between La Meilleraye's brother Jacques de Moy, seigneur de Pierrecourt, Jean le Myre, a member of La Meilleraye's household and La Meilleraye's cousin Nicolas de Moy, sieur de Vereins in the hopes of advancing the planning of the expedition. The plans gestated over the following years as he struggled for funds and domestic support. The death of the kings' brother Alençon in 1584 put them on a permanent hold as Guise became entirely consumed by domestic disputes.

=== Alienation ===
In 1583, Henri desired to reconsolidate the fractured governate of Normandie, with the aim of giving the key office to his favourite Anne de Joyeuse. He had long been concerned with Guisard influence in the province, and in 1580 had promoted Matignon to the office of Marshal, leading to his governorship falling into abeyance, however he desired to further weaken the family in the province. The three current governors could not simply be dispossessed without compensation however. To this end, Carrouges and La Meilleraye were bought off with 60,000 livres each, to return to their lieutenant-general posts that they had occupied previously. Carrouges insisted that his son would inherit his office, and this was granted. La Meilleraye thus became the lieutenant general of Caux, Gisors and the Cotentin once more. Matignon proved more tenacious, and was bought off with a lieutenant-generalcy in Guyenne on the condition that his son would inherit his lieutenant-generalship in Normandie. Joyeuse's administration alarmed the notables of Normandie, while he was an ultra-Catholic, unlike some other of Henri's mignons he represented a significant royal consolidation of power at the expense of the local nobility. He appointed his relatives to the recently vacated governorships of Le Havre and Dieppe, further upsetting the Norman elite. Carrouges and La Meilleraye were thus pushed further from the crown and towards the gestating beginnings of the second Ligue.

=== Second Ligue ===
The death of Alençon brought a second wave of Ligues across France. In Rouen, one of La Meilleraye's former co-governors of Normandie, Carrouges, struggled to accommodate the ligue with the assertive town council. Eventually Charles, Duke of Mayenne, one of the national leaders of the ligue visited the town, hoping to resolve the issue. While not openly at arms with Charles I, Duke of Elbeuf, La Meilleraye and his brother were known to be partisans of the ligue. Their cousins Louis de Moy, sieur de Gomméron and François de Moy, sieur de Richebourg were more active, participating in the Day of the Barricades in Paris, that saw the king expelled from the city.

=== Ligue domination, and death ===
In March 1589 Mayenne established a ligue holy council with authority over all of Normandie. Now that Rouen was in the fold, La Meilleraye's brother Pierrecourt wrote of his intention to capture Pont-Audemer for the ligue. La Meilleraye for his part became de facto governor of Rouen on the departure of Carrouges.At this point the only towns outside his authority in upper Normandy were Le Havre which was controlled by Villars and Dieppe which was held by the crown. The 'holy council' was dominated by the two lieutenant-generals of Normandie, La Meilleraye and Pierrecourt. Disputes would continue in Rouen as the town baulked at the ligue taxes and troops. Eventually Mayenne was compelled to instal Jean de Saulx-Tavannes as leader of the holy council in spring 1590. By this time La Meilleraye was over 60 years old, and his increasing ill health made the ligue leadership of the region increasingly listless. Though he had for a while been haemorrhaging influence, he died in October 1591. His cousin Richebourg had died in 1589, and Pierrecourt would die the following year in 1592, meanwhile Riberpré had been killed in a duel with Villars. The rapid death of the families leading members decimating their social influence over Normandie.

== Sources ==
- Carroll, Stuart (2005). Noble Power during the French Wars of Religion: The Guise Affinity and the Catholic Cause in Normandy. Cambridge University Press.
- Carroll, Stuart (2009). Martyrs and Murderers: The Guise Family and the Making of Europe. Oxford University Press.
- Harding, Robert (1978). Anatomy of a Power Elite: the Provincial Governors in Early Modern France. Yale University Press.
