= Jacques II de Goyon =

French nobleman and governor

- Seigneur de Matignon
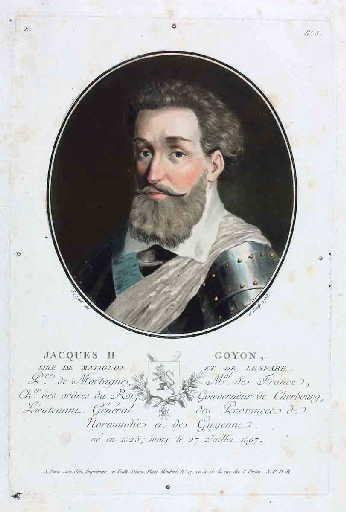
- Portrait of Matignon
- Other titles: Marshal of France; Governor of Lower Normandy
- Born: Lonrai, Kingdom of France
- Died: 27 July 1598 (aged 75); Lesparre-Médoc, Kingdom of France
- Family: Maison de Goüyon
- Spouse: Françoise de Daillon du Lude
- Issue: Odet de Goyon; Lancelot Goyon de Matignon; Charles Goyon de Matignon (1564-1648); Anne de Carbonnel
- Father: Jacques I de Goyon
- Mother: Anne de SIlly

Jacques II de Goyon seigneur de Matignon (1525-1598) was a governor and Marshal of France. Coming from a prominent Norman family, he assumed the role of Lieutenant-General of lower Normandy. In this position he came into conflict with the Protestant governor of Normandy Bouillon. During the first civil war Matignon would come into conflict with the governor, who occupied a third individual position between the crown and the rebels as he felt his authority eroded. In 1574 the governorship of Normandy which had become vacant was split into three separate offices between Matignon, Meilleraye and Carrouges. He would hold the governorship until it was reunited in 1583 for Henri III's favourite Anne de Joyeuse.

He would continue to serve the crown loyally under Henri III, subduing a rebellion orchestrated by Gabriel de Lorges, Count of Montgomery in 1574. Soon after this in 1575 he was elevated as a Marshal to oppose the influence of Retz. In 1579 he again had to subdue a Protestant rebellion, this time led by Condé Having lost out on his governorship, he was granted office in Guyenne as compensation, a role in which he enriched himself in the coming years. As the ligue triumphed in the late 1580s, Matignon half heartedly enforced their policy before joining up with Navarre whene Henri III broke with the ligue in 1588. He assisted Navarre in his difficulties with the Croquant rebellions before dying in 1598.

== Early life and family ==
The Matignon family had traditionally held the lieutenant-generalship of lower Normandy.

== Reign of Charles IX ==
=== Religious dispute ===
Opposition to the Protestant governor Bouillon coalesced around two axes after his return to his governorship in 1561. The first was Villebon lieutenant general of upper Normandy, the latter was Matignon who held command in lower Normandy. Both acquired a sordid reputation with the Calvinist population of the province, this was despite Matignon's own sister having converted to Protestantism.

=== First civil war ===
As towns fell to the rebels in early 1562, Claude, Duke of Aumale was granted a special commission as lieutenant-general of Normandy to restore royal authority. To support him Matignon acted as his lieutenant for lower Normandy. While locally important, he was a fidèle of Catherine, and it was hoped he would counterbalance the Guise influence Aumale was bringing to Normandy. Bouillon, whose authority was usurped by these commissions was furious, and besieged Matignon in Cherbourg. Money was in short supply, and Matignon as much as his Protestant adversaries in Rouen relied on melted down church plate to fund his troops. For the moment he remained on the defensive in Cherbourg, awaiting reinforcements. For his service to the crown Matignon would feature in the départments list of gendarme captains in 1563, alongside many of the other powerful nobles of the realm.

=== Division of Normandy ===
Matignon had a rivalry in Normandy with Jean de Moy, who was the lieutenant-general of upper Normandy. Another prominent Norman captain Carrouges also despised him, complaining bitterly of the fact he received a smaller pension than Matignon. The three would hold the governorship of Normandy while it was divided into three, between 1574 and 1583.

== Reign of Henri III ==
=== Montgomery ===
On the death of Charles IX in 1574, Montgomery took the opportunity to attempt to seize Alençon, departing Carentan with 650 horse hoping to surprise the city. Matignon was ready, and attacked him as he moved from Alençon to raise the siege of St Lô pinning him down in Domfront. Defending the town vigorously, while his opponent received reinforcements from Paris, he was eventually subdued, with Matignon promising that his life would be spared. However, Montgomery was the man who had accidentally killed Henri II and Catherine de'Medici had not forgiven him. Brought to Paris, she would see him executed on 26 June before a large crowd. Matignons army, now numbering around 7500 marched on Saint-Lô, bringing the siege of the town to a successful conclusion. His operations were almost derailed by a threatened strike from his artillery officers due to lack of pay, however Catherine arranged for the sum to be forwarded to them from Paris. This accomplished Carentan opened its gates to him, and Normandy was subdued.

=== Return of Henri ===
Henri III who had been in Polish-Lithuanian Commonwealth as their king, returned to France in early 1575 and was crowned king. To inaugurate his reign he elevated Matignon and Biron to Marshals with the aim of diluting Retz's influence. He promptly resigned his Marshalate.

Displeasure about royal taxation was increasing throughout late 1578, with anger at local estates threatening to spill over into armed revolt. Matignon in his role as governor of lower Normandy wrote to the king informing him of areas where there might be trouble, and further stepped in to stop a disturbance in Coutances. In December Henri wrote back, indicating his fears that greater trouble was on the horizon in Caen, and to be on the lookout.

=== Seventh war of religion ===
In 1579, Condé, frustrated about his failure to re-acquire the governorship of Picardie, seized the town of La Fère, initiating the seventh war of religion. Matignon settled in to siege the city for the crown, succeeding in reducing it after ten months. He was joined by a considerable ligue force under Aumale as he conducted his siege, and perhaps as a result offered generous terms to the besieged, hoping to avoid giving the ligue political advantage. Aumale fumed when he was made aware of the terms, and stormed out of the royal camp without taking leave of Matignon.

In 1581 he accompanied Catherine as she tried to appeal to Alençon who was determined to take up a role as king of the Netherlands. At a meeting he warned the duke that his plans were likely to end in disaster. Alençon responded that if not for the presence of his mother he would have Matignon beaten and thrown from a window.

=== Guyenne ===
In 1583 the governorship of Normandy was re-consolidated into one office, and provided to Henri's favourite, Anne de Joyeuse, in compensation, Matignon was reassigned to Guyenne where he and Épernon were granted the office of lieutenant-generals. In further compensation it was agreed that Matignons son would receive the singular lieutenant-general role of the reunified governorship after François d'O had a period in the role.

=== Triumph of the ligue ===
In 1585, the Catholic ligue led by Henry I, Duke of Guise successfully forced the capitulation of the crown, in the Treaty of Nemours into revoking all edicts of pacification, and to accept the ligue as a mechanism by which Calvinism might be destroyed. As a result, the royal army was now tasked with crushing the forces of Navarre and Condé. While the forces of the ligue set to work with zeal, Marshals Matignon and Biron in Guyenne half heartedly pressed against Navarre. With the assassination of the duke of Guise by the king in 1588, the king indicated to Navarre he was ready to ally with the politiques against the ligue, and they met in April 1589, signing an agreement. Matignon at this time held Bordeaux for the king, but Henri had little territory left aside from that.

== Reign of Henri IV ==
=== Fighting the ligue ===
Now loyal to Navarre, Matignon continued to hold Guyenne for his new king, now established as a governor. Matignon conducted punitive expeditions for Navarre in 1594, his forces descending into the Dordogne, however much of the liguer nobility retreated to their château's, waited for the threat to pass, and then re-emerged.

=== Croquant rebellions ===
The continued ravages of the civil wars had left many peasants destitute by this point, and many turned to join the growing Croquant rebellions in the south west of France. In response to this, the nobility formed leagues of their own independent of higher authority, to crush the peasants. These leagues claimed loyalty to Matignon, but he lacked much in the way of control over them. Bourdeille wrote to Matignon, asking for funds so that he might attack the Croquants. In May the king gave the greenlight to a potential campaign by Bourdeille, if his existing policy of appeasement of the peasantry failed. On Matignon's orders Bourdeille assembled a large force. The presence of this force pushed the Croquant general La Saigne, to the negotiating table. While a formal peace would not be established, the Croquant force would melt away with some of their demands met.

=== Assembly of Notables ===
In November 1596, the king convoked an Assembly of Notables at Rouen. Their purpose was to consider several proposals to alleviate the financial hardship the kingdom was experiencing. One package was prepared by the king's minister the baron de Rosny and proposed various quick expedients to secure a cash flow, the other was devised by Bellièvre, and was constituted of a wide scale austerity program, with large restructuring of France's finances. To lead the discussions of the notables in considering these proposals matters were divided into three chambers which were led by Matignon, Marshal Retz and the duc de Montpensier respectively.

In the end, the notables agreed to the establishment of a new tax, known as the pancarte which appropriated 1/20th of the revenue of goods, and a year long suspension of royal wages among other resolutions.

=== Death ===
Upon Matignon's death, it was reputed that he had entered Guyenne with 10,000 livres in rent, and in his 12 years in the region increase his wealth to 100,000 livres. During the latter civil wars the Parlement of Bordeaux had provided many 'gifts' to Matignon. When the jurats whom he had appointed acquired the barony of Montferrand for 117,000 livres to stop it falling into the hands of the rebels. Matignon had persuaded them to give the rights to the barony to him as one such gift.

== Sources ==
- Babelon, Jean-Pierre (2009). Henri IV. Fayard.
- Carroll, Stuart (1998). Noble Power during the French Wars of Religion: The Guise Affinity and the Catholic Cause in Normandy. Cambridge University Press.
- Harding, Robert (1978). Anatomy of a Power Elite: the Provincial Governors in Early Modern France. Yale University Press.
- Knecht, Robert (1998). Catherine de' Medici. Routledge.
- Salmon, J.H.M (1975). Society in Crisis: France during the Sixteenth Century. Metheun & Co.
- Thompson, James (1909). The Wars of Religion in France 1559-1576: The Huguenots, Catherine de Medici and Philip II. Chicago University Press.
- Wood, James (2002). The Kings Army: Warfare, Soldiers and Society during the Wars of Religion in France, 1562-1576. Cambridge University Press.
