= Treaty of Bergerac =

1577 treaty between France and the Huguenots

The Treaty of Bergerac was signed at Bergerac on 14 September 1577 between Henry III of France and Huguenot princes, and later ratified by the Edict of Poitiers on 17 September. This accord was developed after the sixth phase of the French Wars of Religion. The treaty replaced the Edict of Beaulieu, which was deemed by the Catholic League as too favorable to Protestants. Based on the terms of the treaty, Huguenots were only allowed to practice their faith in the suburbs of one town in each judicial district. In Vivarais, the treaty was recognized in late October 1577.

== See also ==
- List of treaties
