= Edict of Beaulieu =

1576 edict by Henry III of France

The Edict of Beaulieu (also known at the time as the Peace of Monsieur) was promulgated from Beaulieu-lès-Loches on 6 May 1576 by Henry III of France, who was pressured by Alençon's support of the Protestant army besieging Paris that spring.

The Edict, which was negotiated by the king's brother, Monsieur François, duc d'Alençon, who was now made duc d'Anjou gave Huguenots the right of public worship for their religion, thenceforth officially called the religion prétendue réformée ("supposed reformed religion"), throughout France, except at Paris and at Court. Huguenots were permitted to own and build churches, to hold consistories and synods, and occupy eight fortified towns called places de sûreté. In eight of the parlements, chambers were created called mis-parties because the same number of Catholics and Protestants sat in these tribunals. Additionally, there was to be a disclaimer of the Massacre of St. Bartholomew, and the families which had suffered from it were to be returned to positions of prominence and fairly compensated. In response, Catholics who were opposed to these concessions to the Huguenots organised the Catholic League.

The King held a lit de justice in the Parlement of Paris on 14 May to subvert pending opposition in the strongly Catholic parlement and to ensure that the Edict was duly inscribed. In December 1576, however, the States-General of Blois declared itself against the Edict of Beaulieu. Thereupon the Protestants took up arms under the leadership of Henry of Navarre, who, escaping from the Court, had returned to the Calvinism which he had abjured at the time of the Massacre of St. Bartholomew. The advantage was on the Catholic side, thanks to some successes achieved by the duc d'Anjou. In September 1577, the Treaty of Bergerac, confirmed by the Edict of Poitiers, left the Huguenots the free exercise of their religion only in the suburbs of one town in each bailiwick (bailliage), and in those places where it had been practiced before the outbreak of hostilities and which they occupied at the current date.

== See also ==
- French Wars of Religion
- List of treaties

== Sources ==
- Pierre Miquel, Les Guerres de religion, Fayard, 1980. ISBN 2-7242-0785-8.
- Wilkinson, Maurice, "The Wars of Religion in the Périgord", The English Historical Review 21, No. 84., October 1906, (Oxford University Press).
