= Louis d'Angennes =

French noble, diplomat, governor and soldier

- seigneur de Maintenon
- Maintenon's coat of arms
- Born: c. 1536
- Died: c. 1610
- Noble family: House of Angennes
- Spouse: Françoise d'O
- Father: Jacques d'Angennes
- Mother: Isabelle Cottereau

Louis d'Angennes, seigneur de Maintenon (c. 1536 –c. 1610) was a French noble, diplomat, governor and soldier during the French Wars of Religion. The son of Jacques d'Angennes and Isabelle Cottereau, he first achieved prominence in 1568, when he was established as governor of Le Mans. He reinvigorated the cities Catholic ligue for a fight against Protestantism. At that time he became grand maréchal de logis de la maison du roi, a post he would hold until 1579. He fought for the crown during the brief seventh civil war at the Siege of La Fère. In 1580 he was established as one of the king's Chambellan. The following year he would be elevated to the most senior order of French chivalry, being among the 1581 intake as a Ordre du Saint-Esprit. He and his brother Rambouillet participated in the Assembly of Notables that sought to consider a financial reform package from 1583-1584. His selection to participate in the Estates General of 1588 was forced through by the king over the objection of the governor of Chartres who had hoped to select a less royalist delegate. At the Estates, when word arrived that the duke of Savoie had invaded French held Saluzzo he whipped the Second Estate into a patriotic fervour with a speech advocating first the recapture of Saluzzo, and then the declaration of war against Spain. However the ligueur members of the other States got the nobility back into line, and his plan went nowhere.

Henri, increasingly unable to tolerate the humiliations inflicted on him by the duke of Guise and ligue resolved that something needed to be done in December 1588. He took council with Maintenon, Rambouillet, Marshal Aumont and the future Marshal Ornano to discuss how to proceed. Three of them favoured assassinating the duke of Guise. After some more consultation, Henri had the duke killed on 23 December, at a council meeting attended by Maintenon. In retaliation for the assassination, the ligue entered an open war with Henri. Henri in turn was assassinated on 1 August by Jacques Clément. The enraged Maintenon proposed to his heir, the Protestant Navarre that they respond by putting Paris to a sack after their siege was concluded. Navarre, now styling himself Henri IV was unable to do so, as the royal army dissolved from defections of those not willing to serve a Protestant king. Maintenon was among the Catholic nobility who remained royalist and having fought in the brief siege of Paris, he continued to serve Henri, fighting at Arques in September. He died in 1610 at the age of 74.

== Early life and family ==
Louis d'Angennes was born in 1536, one of nine sons of Jacques d'Angennes and Isabelle Cottereau. His father Jacques served as captain of François I's personal guard. In 1552 France captured Metz, and he would serve as one of the cities governors.

Louis d'Angennes married Françoise d'O, a sister of Henri III's favourite François d'O in 1573. At the time of the marriage, Maintenon was 36, and his wife was 22. Henri rewarded the marriage with a gift of 25,000 livres to Maintenon. He further received 100,000 livres from his wife as a dowry. The two families were united not only by their proximity to royal favour, but also the closeness of their geographic interests, both being lords with lands in the south west of Île de France.

In 1580, Maintenon established himself in a hôtel on the rue Saint-Thomas-du-Louvre, adjoining the hôtel of his brother in law D'O. He took out a 6-year lease for the building, which was unusually long, and reflected his attachment to the court.

== Reign of Charles IX ==
=== Ligueur ===
When in 1568 Maintenon was appointed as lieutenant-general of Le Mans, he set to work reinvigorating the local ligue. In July he had reinvigorated the movement, with the participation of his brother Charles d'Angennes, the bishop of Le Mans; Vassé, the governor of Anjou and Louis III de la Trémoille the lieutenant-general of the Orléannais, Touraine, Anjou and Maine. The ligue met outside the town and swore to resist Protestantism until death. He wrote to the crown explaining his actions, explaining that he had done it without the authority of the king, but was hoping to fulfill the charge Catherine de Medici had given him through his appointment. Later in his career, he would be a royalist.

That same year, Maintenon received the post of grand maréchal de logis de la maison du roi he would hold this post until 1579, when he was persuaded to resign it in favour of Méry de Barbezières one of the king's long time favourites.

== Reign of Henri III ==
During the reign of Henri III, Maintenon fulfilled a variety of roles for his lord. He was captain of fifty men-at-arms, extraordinary ambassador to España and was appointed Chambellan in 1580.

=== Sixth war of religion ===
With the generous Peace of Monsieur having been broken off in 1577, and civil war resumed. The king's brother Alençon, now loyal to the crown desired to prove himself by campaigning against the rebels he had fought with in the prior civil war. Henri gave him command of the army, and many of the king's favourites filled its ranks. Not among them however were Maitenon, D'O, La Guiche and Georges de Villequier who preferred to stay with the royal court in Poitou. The royal army besieged first La Charité-sur-Loire and then Issoire, subjecting each to a brutal sack after they were stormed. As the royal army progressed, it disintegrated, the king having been unable to secure funds from the Estates General for the campaign, as such a peace was concluded in the Treaty of Bergerac in September.

=== Seventh war of religion ===
In 1578, Maintenon was elevated to being a member of Henri's council of state. His attendance would be sporadic, like his brothers. He fought again for the king in the brief civil war of 1580, where he was present at the Siege of La Fère, the city having been seized by the Protestant prince of Condé. He arrived on the siege lines in February. After months of siege, the town was willing to provide terms, Marshal Matignon, in overall command offered a generous settlement to La Fère, hoping to blunt the advantage to the ligueurs aligned duke of Aumale who had brought a large contingent to assist with the siege.

Having established his new order of chivalry in 1578, Maintenon was included in its fourth induction on 31 December 1581 as a chevalier de l'Ordre du Saint Esprit.

Hoping to reform abuses in the kingdom, Henri established an Assembly of Notables to look through reform packages from 1583 to 1584. Both Maintenon and his brother Rambouillet participated in the proceedings.

=== Estates General of 1588 ===
With the Estates General called, a vicious election campaign got underway, as Henri and the ligueurs competed through whatever means they had at their disposal for prospective control of the body. In Chartres, Henri intervened in the election of the noble deputy. He asked the governor of the city whether a candidate had been selected for the area. the seigneur de Réclainville told him the decision had not yet been made, but that the candidacies of the baron de Courville and sieur de Memelon were being considered. Henri did not feel either of these men could be trusted to support him reliably in the upcoming meeting, he dismissed Memelon as obstinate and a dream, and Courville for a minor military defeat. Henri proposed Maintenon be the deputy for Chartres. Réclainville started stuttering, horrified at the proposal yet unable to voice his opposition. Hesitating to accept, Henri snapped at Réclainville, telling him if Courville was dispatched to the estates at Blois, he would have him executed. Réclainville acceded to the king, and Maintenon was selected. This proved one of the minority of areas in which Henri achieved success, meanwhile the Lorraine family busied itself with engineering ligueur elections in Bourgogne, Picardie and Champagne.

During the Estates General word arrived that the duke of Savoie had invaded France and seized Saluzzo, the final Italian possession France held from the Italian Wars. Maintenon rallied the Second Estate behind him, convincing them of his royalist argument that not only should they seize Saluzzo back from Savoie they should unite the kingdom behind a war against a hereditary enemy Spain. The First and Third Estates were not as easily won to Maintenon's arguments, and favoured focusing the kingdoms military efforts in an internal war against heresy, the noble Second Estate was eventually brought back into line with this perspective. Henri was humiliated, and incorrectly saw the hand of the duke of Guise behind the original invasion.

=== Assassination of the duke of Guise ===
Henri could no longer tolerate the humiliations put upon him by the duke of Guise and the ligue and resolved to take some action against them by December 1588. On 18 December he took council with Marshal Aumont, the future Marshal Ornano and two of the Angennes brothers, Maintenon and Rambouillet. At the council three of the four present spoke in favour of assassinating the duke. After some more consultation this was the course of action Henri decided to pursue.

Henri convened his council on 23 December, present were Maintenon, Rambouillet, D'O, Aumont, Retz the archbishop of Lyon Pierre d'Épinac; the cardinals of Guise, Vendôme and Gondi; and the duke of Guise. Guise was called off to a side room, so that he might meet with the king, shortly thereafter he was cut down.

Writing sometime after, one of the duke's young valets puts particular responsibility in the hands of Maintenon and his brother Rambouillet for what had transpired.

With the assassination accomplished, Henri again reconfigured his council to ensure its reliable trustworthiness. Maintenon and Rambouillet were both among those who maintained their position in the king's inner circle. Maintenon accompanied the king as he moved from Blois to Tours. In Tours Henri established an exiled version of the Paris Parlement filled with the royalist deputies expelled from the ligueur controlled Paris Parlement. Maintenon was present for the lit de justice that Henri opened the chamber with.

== Reign of Henri IV ==
=== Revenge ===
After the Assassination of Henri III on 1 August, Maintenon was furious. He campaigned for the king's cousin, Navarre, now styling himself Henri IV, to seize the moment and attack Paris. Maintenon wanted the attack on Paris to be a merciless sack to punish the city for killing their rightful king. Henri however, no longer had a substantial enough army to besiege Paris, and broke off the encirclement.

=== Loyalist ===
A loyal supporter of the Protestant Henri, Maintenon was among the grandees who signed a letter on 18 August to the granduca di Toscagne justifying the noble Catholic support for a 'heretic' king.

Having fought at the siege of Paris, Maintenon again fought with the king at his victory of Arques in September.

== Sources ==
- Baumgartner, Frederic (1988). Henry II: King of france 1547-1559. Duke University Press.
- Carroll, Stuart (2005). Noble Power During the French Wars of Religion: The Guise Affinity and the Catholic Cause in Normandy. Cambridge University Press.
- Chevallier, Pierre (1985). Henri III: Roi Shakespearien. Fayard.
- Cloulas, Ivan (1979). Catherine de Médicis. Fayard.
- Constant, Jean-Marie (1984). Les Guise. Hachette.
- Constant, Jean-Marie (1996). La Ligue. Fayard.
- Harding, Robert (1978). Anatomy of a Power Elite: the Provincial Governors in Early Modern France. Yale University Press.
- Holt, Mack (2002). The Duke of Anjou and the Politique Struggle During the Wars of Religion. Cambridge University Press.
- Jouanna, Arlette (1998). Histoire et Dictionnaire des Guerres de Religion. Bouquins.
- Knecht, Robert (2010). The French Wars of Religion, 1559-1598. Routledge.
- Knecht, Robert (2016). Hero or Tyrant? Henry III, King of France, 1574-1589. Routledge.
- Roelker, Nancy (1996). One King, One Faith: The Parlement of Paris and the Religious Reformation of the Sixteenth Century. University of California Press.
- Le Roux, Nicolas (2000). La Faveur du Roi: Mignons et Courtisans au Temps des Derniers Valois. Champ Vallon.
- Le Roux, Nicolas (2006). Un Régicide au nom de Dieu: L'Assassinat d'Henri III. Gallimard.
- Sutherland, Nicola (1980). The Huguenot Struggle for Recognition. Yale University Press.
