= Jean-Baptiste d'Ornano =

French nobleman (1581–1626)

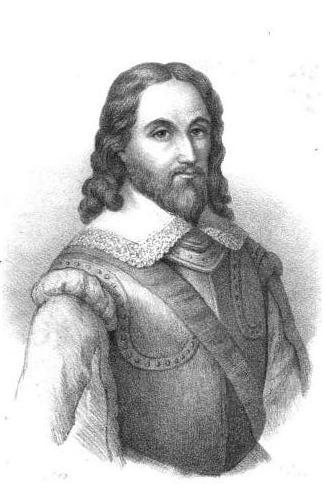
A posthumous image of Ornano from the 19th century

Jean-Baptiste d'Ornano, Marquis de Montlaur (1581–1626) was a French nobleman and Marshal of France (1626).

== Biography ==
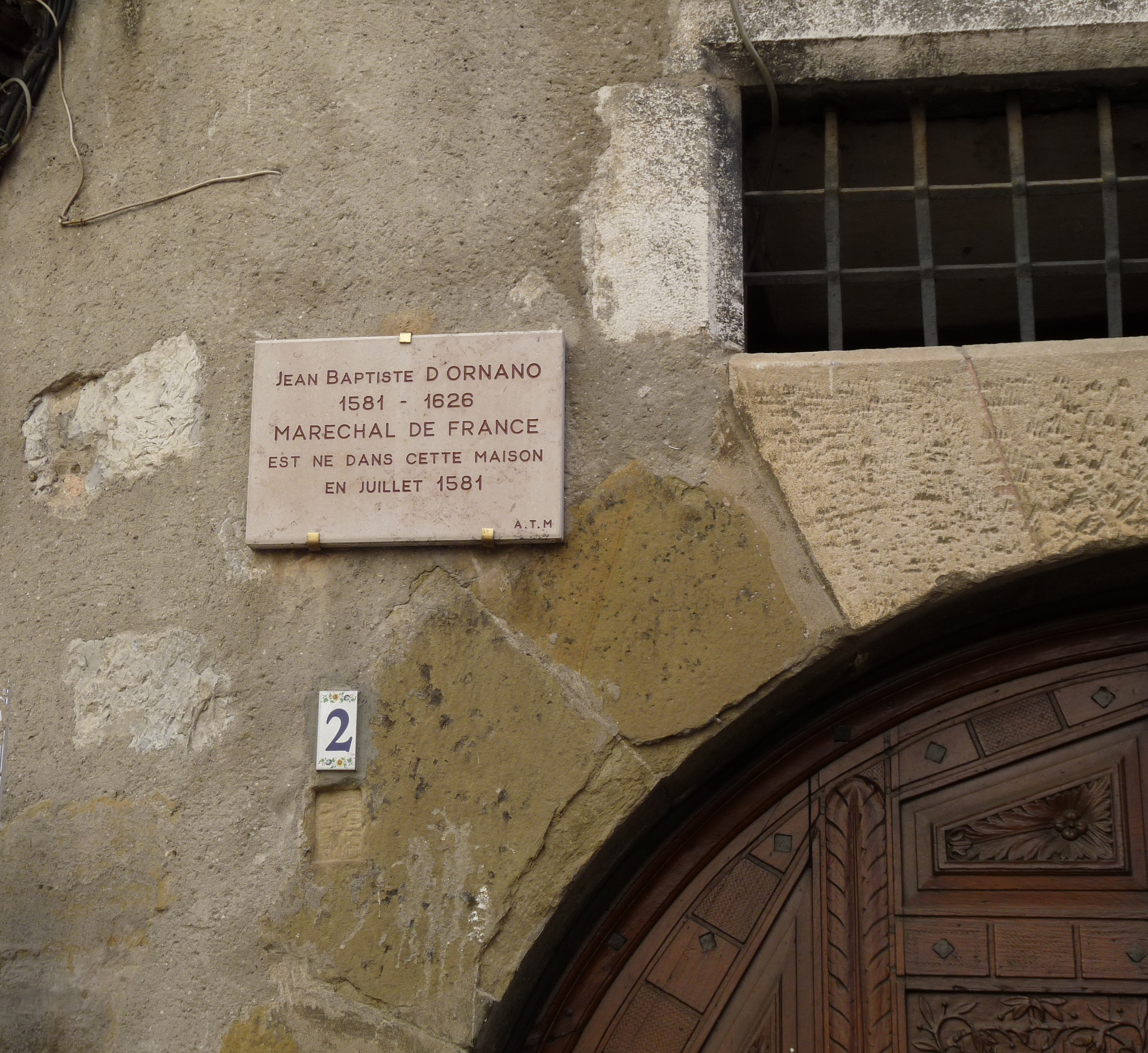
Ornano's birth house in Sisteron

He was the son of Alphonse d'Ornano and grandson of Sampiero Corso.
Early in his childhood, he was prepared to come to court and was also trained in strategy. He demonstrated considerable skill in the latter, commanding a company of Chevau-légers at the Siege of La Fère in 1596 (after the Siege of Calais) at the age of 14.

He was one of the first to praise Louis XIII for assassinating Concino Concini and regarded him as the true ruler. It was him who shouted: "Sire, at this hour you are king, for Marshal Ancre is dead," marking his political rise. This pleased the insecure fifteen-year-old king, who wished to be remembered as "the Just," justifying his decision as a popular cause. That's also the reason why he put Ornano, along with a captain of the king's guards (Nicolas de l'Hôpital de Vitry) and the latter's brother in charge of the king's military orders in Paris in order to prohibit riots.

After the uprising of Marie de' Medici (known as the War of Mother and Son) (1619-1620), he also became governor of the king's brother, Gaston, Duke of Orléans. The royal heir greatly admired Ornano and followed many of his suggestions.

In 1626, this led to the Chalais conspiracy when Ornano persuaded Gaston not to follow the intentions of his mother and his brother to marry. Louis XIII responded by appointing Ornano as marshal of France and then silently arresting him during one of the king's lute concerts at court. Ornano was imprisoned and died of kidney and bladder ailments without confessing anything in prison that same year.
