= Nicolas d'Angennes =

French noble, governor, diplomat and soldier

- sieur de Rambouillet
- Rambouillet's coat of arms
- Born: c. 1531
- Died: c. 1611
- Noble family: House of Angennes
- Spouse: Julienne d'Arquenay
- Issue: Charles d'Angennes
- Father: Jacques d'Angennes
- Mother: Isabelle Cottereau

Nicolas d'Angennes, sieur de Rambouillet (c. 1531 –c. 1611) was a French noble, governor, diplomat and soldier during the French Wars of Religion. The son of Jacques d'Angennes and Isabelle Cottereau, Rambouillet rose fast during the civil wars. In 1568, he was made a chevalier de l'Ordre de Saint-Michel and governor of Maine. In this period he served as a diplomat for the French crown, being given a mission to travel to England. With Anjou, the brother of the king's, election as king of the Commonwealth in 1573, he was dispatched as Anjou's vice-roi to the Commonwealth court in Kraków to thank the senate for his election, and prepare the way for his lord. Upon Anjou's arrival, he would be selected (alongside Retz) as the main conduits between the French court in the country and the local aristocracy. Tiring of the court, he departed back to France, only to again find himself on a mission to the Commonwealth, to inform Anjou that he was now king of France.

The new king, now styling himself Henri, made Rambouillet captain of his guard. Rambouillet was however frustrated he had not received more honours, and spent much time in the next year away from court. He commanded an ordinance company during the fifth war of religion. By 1577, the king was showing greater favour to him, and he became first gentilhomme de la chambre and then Chambellan and commander of 100 gentleman in 1580. That year he was enrolled as a chevalier de l'Ordre du Saint-Esprit. In 1582, he was further buoyed with an appointment as governor of Metz, a key border city with the Holy Roman Empire, he was compelled to resign the post next year to the king's favourite Épernon, but received generous compensation. After the embarrassment of the Day of the Barricades, Henri was forced to flee Paris, and found a safe residence with Rambouillet before moving on to Chartres. In revenge for that humiliation and many others, Henri held council with Rambouillet, his brother Maintenon and the future Marshal Ornano at which it was agreed to assassinate the duke of Guise. In the civil war that followed the assassination Rambouillet stayed with the king at Tours where he was present at the opening of the Parlement of royalist exiles. On 1 August 1589, Henri was assassinated, and his Protestant cousin Navarre succeeded him. Rambouillet remained loyal to the royalist cause after Navarre promised to protect Catholicism, and fought in Maine for the new king, achieving some success. In 1593 he participated in the negotiations at Surasno which created a truce in the war between the royalists and the Catholic Ligue. He died in 1611.

== Early life and family ==
Nicolas d'Angennes, seigneur de Rambouillet, de Vielle-Église, du Perray, des Essarts et des Bréviaires; was a son of Jacques d'Angennes and Isabelle Cottereau, who was the daughter of royal treasurer of France Jean Cottereau. Rambouillet's parents had nine sons together, with Nicolas inheriting his father's primary title. Jacques was the captain of François I's guards. He later served as governor of Metz, the crucial border city that had been taken by France in 1552, before dying in 1562.

Nicolas married Julienne d'Arquenay, who brought with her the vidame du Mans. They had a son Charles, who in 1600 married Catherine de Vivonne.

During his lifetime, his brother Louis d'Angennes, seigneur de Maintenon would secure the lieutenant-generalcy of Maine, and it would become a family possession, held for the next several generations.

Rambouillet was denounced by his enemies in the Catholic ligue as Rambouillet le Huguenot for his perceived tolerance towards the Protestant faith.

== Reign of Charles IX ==
=== Diplomat ===
In January 1566, during the long peace between the first and second civil war, Charles IX sent him to England and Scotland with the insignia of the Order of Saint Michael. In England, Elizabeth I nominated the Duke of Norfolk and the Earl of Leicester to join the French Order in a ceremony at Whitehall Palace. Rambouillet went to Windsor Castle for another ceremony to invest Charles IX in the Order of the Garter. A detailed contemporary account of the ceremony names the envoy as "Jacques d'Angennes", accompanied by the herald Saint Michael, a Monsieur d'Oze, who was given the robes worn by the new knights as a prerequisite.

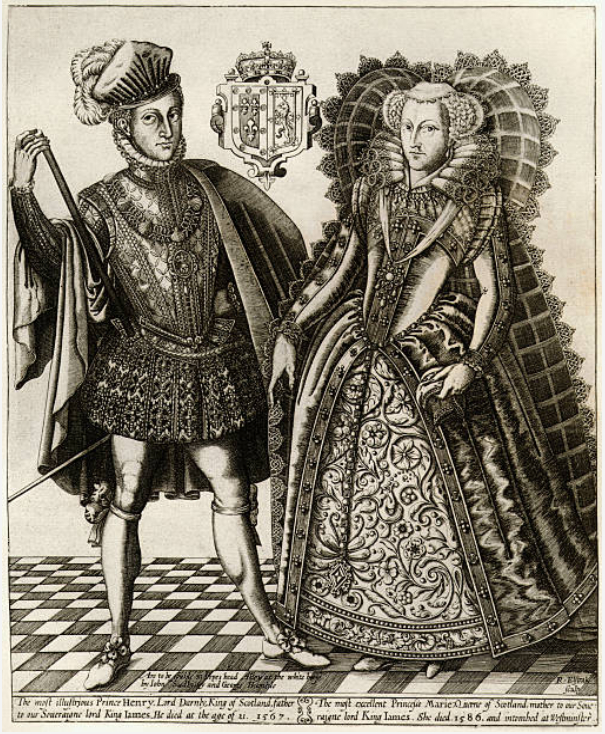
Nicolas d'Angennes brought the Order of Saint Michael to Lord Darnley, depicted wearing the collar in this 1603 engraving.

In Scotland, Rambouillet's mission was to present Henry Stuart, Lord Darnley with the Order. Rambouillet stayed near Holyroodhouse at the house of Henry Kinloch in Edinburgh's Canongate. There were entertainments in Edinburgh at the reception of Rambouillet and the investment of Lord Darnley in the Order, including banquets and masques. Mary, Darnley, and David Rizzio took part in a costly masque with seven other dancers in rich attire to welcome the ambassador. The tailor Jean de Compiègne made six costumes decorated with flames made of cloth of gold reused from old cushion covers. During the masque the queen's ladies, dressed in male costume, presented 8 Scottish dirks or daggers to the French guests, with black velvet scabbards embroidered with gold. A Scottish chronicle described the scene:

And the sammin nycht at evin, our soveranis maid ane banket to the ambassatour foirsaid [Rambouillet], in the auld chappell of Halyrudhous, quhilk wes reapparrellit with fyne tapestrie, and hung magnificentlie, be the saidis lordis maid the maskery efter supper in ane honourable maner. And upoun the ellevint day of the said moneth, the king and quene in lyikmanner bankettit the ambassatour; and at evin our soveranis maid the maskrie and mumschance, in the quhilk the quenis grace, and all hir Maries and ladies wer all cled in men's apperrell; and everie ane of thame presentit ane quhingar [dagger], bravelie and maist artificiallie made and embroiderit with gold, to the ambassatour and his gentilmen, everie one of thame according to his estate.

Following Rambouillet's stay in Edinburgh, a number of local women were slandered as prostitutes and said to have visited the ambassador's lodging dressed in men's clothes. Rambouillet returned to France via London, where he was joined by a Scottish envoy, Robert Melville. They requested the release of Margaret Douglas, then a prisoner in the Tower of London. Rambouillet continued to show an interest in Mary's political affairs. She wrote to him from Chatsworth when he was again ambassador to London in 1578 as a negotiator for the Alençon marriage, and he asked Queen Elizabeth for a new physician to join her household, Mary mentioned his support in a letter of April 1583.

=== Knight of the Order ===
During the royal charm offensive of 1568, aimed at propping up the crown's support among the French nobility, a significant number of promotions were made to the dignity of chevalier de l'Ordre de Saint-Michel, among them was Rambouillet. In April 1568, Rambouillet received the further dignity of being made governor of Maine.

=== Commonwealth ===
As the siege of La Rochelle dragged on, Anjou sought a way out of the impasse. A coup for his fortunes came when word arrived that he had been elected king of the Commonwealth. He prepared to depart from the siege when word arrived, to depart for his new kingdom. On 18 September, he announced to Karnowski the prymas Polski that he was dispatching Rambouillet as his vice-roi to the country. Rambouillet was sent with a letter, in which Anjou thanked the nobles and senate for electing him, and promised to govern in consultation with them, and defend their country from threats.

Rambouillet established himself at Kraków as ambassador. On route to the country in January 1574, while travelling to his new kingdom, Anjou wrote to his ambassador to reassure him concerning his palace in the city. Anjou was keen to know whether he would be able to come and go from the palace without being seen as his mother liked to do. He instructed Rambouillet to deliver the necessary changes to the design of the palace to facilitate this arrangement, without alerting the procurer as to the reason for the modifications. During Anjou's time as king of the Commonwealth, Rambouillet would be among the oldest in his entourage, being older than 40, the vast majority of Henri's associates were young men that had entered royal service around the turn of the decade.

Rambouillet received, Retz one of the chief members of Anjou's entourage in Kraków prior to the king's arrival and the two men were tasked with overseeing the burial of the prior king of the Commonwealth Zygmunt II August. On 17 February Anjou made his formal entry into the city. Retz and Rambouillet led negotiations with the local nobility to hammer out the specifics of the coronation ceremony, both energetically defending his prerogatives in the discussions. On 21 February the coronation took place, shortly thereafter Rambouillet was among the notables Anjou brought with him for the first meeting with the assembled ambassador corps.

Throughout his brief reign in the Commonwealth, Rambouillet and Retz would hold the role of the king's prime interlocuter with the local nobility and ambassadors. However they would stay for an even shorter time in the country than their master, departing on 20 April to take the waters of Lucca, along with Mayenne and Nevers. Of the 36 gentleman who had accompanied Anjou, only 17 remained with him by the end of April, leaving the king increasingly isolated. On 4 June, Charles IX having died, Rambouillet was dispatched back to the Commonwealth to inform Anjou of the news, alongside Antoine d'Estrées and Henri d'Albret-Miossens. Anjou quickly decided to abandon his new kingdom, and return to take the crown of France as Henri III.

== Reign of Henri III ==
=== Captain of the guard ===
At the start of the reign of the new king, Rambouillet was included among the small group that comprised the conseil privé, the most interior council. Henri quickly set about reshaping the government to his liking. The captain of the king's guard, Eustache de Conflans, vicomte d'Auchy, was to be replaced by his fidèle Rambouillet. Auchy was a client of the Guise, and fortunately for Henri, died on 18 July of that year anyway. Catherine had initially sought to provide this post to one of her favourites, Lansac, however Henri placed Rambouillet in the role while he was in Turin on the way back to France. Arriving in the kingdom Henri and his entourage entered Lyon. Henri considered Rambouillet his eyes and ears in the city, urging him to daily send him dispatches and reports so that he could remain up to date with affairs, and to conceal secret information in separate letters hidden in the mailed packets. Despite this, Rambouillet, and the captain of the French guard Gaspard de La Châtre, seigneur de Nançay felt their services had been ill rewarded, and they retired to their seigneuries in late 1574, and would spend much of 1575 there also. Rambouillet had not been a member of Henri's entourage during the siege of La Rochelle, and felt this had been counted against him.

In spring 1575, Bussy, the chief favourite of the king's brother found himself in conflict with a gentleman named Saint-Phal over the affections of a woman, the dame d'Acigne. Bussy desired to marry her, but she preferred the attentions of Saint-Phal. The two came to blows with their seconds, and Bussy departed the scene, telling Saint-Phal to meet him on the Île de la Cité for a proper duel. The following day Bussy awaited his romantic rival at the designated location, a crowd began to gather around him in expectation of the violence that was to follow. At this moment Rambouillet was passing, with an archer and the two men observed the scene with disapproval. Together they extricated Bussy and he returned to his patron Alençon's hôtel. Rambouillet informed the king and he ordered the duke of Nevers and Retz to settle the matter. Bussy resisted their arbitration, demanding to fight Saint-Phal in a judicial duel, but Henri refused to counternance such a course.

During the fifth civil war, Rambouillet would serve as the commander of an ordinance company.

=== Return to prominence ===
By 1577, Rambouillet had returned from his seigneurie, and had been established as a gentilhomme de la chambre, affording him a privileged access to the king's person. He would hold this role until March 1580 when he ceded it to Manou. In return for yielding this office, he was granted the more prestigious office of captaine des Cent-gentilhommes.

In 1580 he would be granted the post of Chambellan, however he only held this for one year.

After the king created a new order of chivalry, to supersede the previous royal Ordre de Saint-Michel, Rambouillet was among those promoted as a chevalier de l'Ordre du Saint Esprit in the third intake, that of December 1580.

=== Metz ===
On 21 February 1582, he received the coveted appointment as governor of Metz and the Pays Messin. He gained this prize due to the resignation from the office of the marquis de Piennes, who was compensated for departing the office with 35,000 écus and the title of duke of Maignelay. Rambouillet would not stay in the role for long however, only managing one short visit to his governate in September 1582, before being compelled to step aside in 1583 in favour of one of the king's paramount favourites Épernon in return for a gratuity of 100,000 livres. Épernon would hold the governate until 1634.

Having long been a member of the conseil privé, in 1584, Rambouillet was inducted into the conseil d'État. Rambouillet was among the grandees, involved in the meetings of the Assembly of Notables, that met from 1583 to 1584, present alongside his brother Maintenon. He was entrusted in 1587, with the responsibility of serving as captain for the second company of Henri's gentilhomme de la chambre.

=== Day of the Barricades ===
After having been humiliated in Paris, and forced to flee the capital during the Day of the Barricades, Henri first headed to the safety of the Château de Rambouillet on 13 May, composing himself there, before heading on to Chartres.

During September, Henri dismissed most of his chief ministers and advisers, bringing forth a new group of men into his council. Rambouillet maintained his position in the king's inner circle of advisers.

Henri was increasingly unable to tolerate the various indignities forced upon him by the Guise, and the ligue. He reached his breaking point after the humiliations of the Estates General of 1588. On 19 December, he held council with Rambouillet, his brother Maintenon, Marshal Aumont and the future Marshal Ornano. The group expounded upon the various grievances that could be laid at the foot of Guise. Of the four assembled men, three favoured killing the duke.

The same group of men surrounded Henri in the preparations for the assassination on the morning of 23 December, at 07:00 that morning Henri ushered them to head off ready for the morning council that Guise was to attend. Guise arrived a little while later, and after some time in the council chamber was called off into a side room to meet the king, where he was stabbed to death. His brother, Cardinal Guise heard the commotion from the council chamber, and rose suddenly, hoping to break through to his brother. He was restrained by Rambouillet, Aumont, Retz and D'O to be detained shortly thereafter.

=== Exile ===
Henri, in exile from the capital at Tours, Rambouillet stayed with him in the city. During this period he and his brother Maintenon were among the kings closest confidents. Rambouillet was present at the lit de justice that opened the royalist Parlement de Tours, composed of royalist exiles who had been expelled from the ligueur controlled Paris Parlement.

Given Rambouillet had partial responsibility for the security of the king, when a Dominican friar named Jacques Clément crossed the siege lines from Paris, desiring to kill Henri, Jacques La Guesle, who Clément had first approached with his false mission, to join the king's cause, discussed the man with Rambouillet. Following supper together, Rambouillet got La Guesle into contact with Henri, who gave his assent to a meeting the following morning with the friar. At the meeting Clément stabbed Henri in the stomach, mortally wounding him.

== Reign of Henri IV ==
=== Loyalist ===
The Protestant heir to the throne Navarre, now styling himself Henri IV, found himself in a very sensitive position on the death of Henri III. Many Catholic notables who had no qualms about serving his predecessor found the prospect of serving a Protestant king intolerable and defected to the ligue. Henri quickly moved to reassure them, promising to protect the Catholic religion, and receive lessons in its teachings. This was sufficient for a segment of the Catholic nobility, among them Marshal Aumont and Biron; the lieutenant-general of Champagne Dinteville; the grand prévôt Richelieu; and Rambouillet. All of them signed a declaration to explain their decision to serve a Protestant king for the Catholic princes of Europe.

Rambouillet fought for his new king vigorously in his province of Maine, successfully lifting the siege of the Château de Sablé in 1590.

=== Estates General of 1593 ===
Mayenne, lieutenant-general of France for the ligue, found himself pressured by his Spanish allies to call an Estates General in 1593 for the election of a Catholic king. Henri did not recognise the estates as valid, as they had not been called by France's king, and thus did not send deputies from the regions he controlled. He did not however want to leave the Estates to their own devises, and reached out to the estates, securing an agreement for a conference between estate deputies and his own at Suresnes. As delegates for this conference, Henri selected Renaud de Beaune the Archbishop of Bourges; Gaspard de Schomberg surintendant des finances; future Chancellor of France Bellièvre and Rambouillet among others. The talks produced a ten-day truce, which would be continuously extended, finally expiring in early 1594.

Until the end of his life, Rambouillet continued to hold his position as the commander of one hundred gentleman. Rambouillet died in 1611, he was succeeded to his titles by his son Charles d'Angennes. He succeeded his father to the position of second captain of the gentilhomme ordinaire.

== Sources ==
- Babelon, Jean-Pierre (2009). Henri IV. Fayard.
- Baumgartner, Frederic (1988). Henry II: King of france 1547-1559. Duke University Press.
- Chevallier, Pierre (1985). Henri III: Roi Shakespearien. Fayard.
- Cloulas, Ivan (1979). Catherine de Médicis. Fayard.
- Constant, Jean-Marie (1984). Les Guise. Hachette.
- Harding, Robert (1978). Anatomy of a Power Elite: the Provincial Governors in Early Modern France. Yale University Press.
- Hume, Martin (1892). Calendar State Papers Spain, 1. HMSO.
- Jouanna, Arlette (1998). Histoire et Dictionnaire des Guerres de Religion. Bouquins.
- Knecht, Robert (2016). Hero or Tyrant? Henry III, King of France, 1574-1589. Routledge.
- Roelker, Nancy (1996). One King, One Faith: The Parlement of Paris and the Religious Reformation of the Sixteenth Century. University of California Press.
- Le Roux, Nicolas (2000). La Faveur du Roi: Mignons et Courtisans au Temps des Derniers Valois. Champ Vallon.
- Le Roux, Nicolas (2006). Un Régicide au nom de Dieu: L'Assassinat d'Henri III. Gallimard.
- Salmon, J.H.M (1979). Society in Crisis: France during the Sixteenth Century. Metheun & Co.
