= Claude d'Angennes =

Claude d'Angennes de Rambouillet (26 August 1538 – 15 May 1601) was Bishop of the Roman Catholic Diocese of Le Mans from 1588 until his death in 1601. He was the fifth son of Jacques d'Angennes, seigneur de Rambouillet, and Isabeau Cottereau, dame de Maintenon.

== Early life, education, and career ==
Born in Rambouillet, he was one of nine sons of Jacques d'Angennes and Isabelle Cottereau, herself the daughter of royal treasurer of France Jean Cottereau. D'Angennes studied the Literæ Humaniores in Paris, and afterwards jurisprudence in Bourges, as he at first intended to follow the bar.

After returning to Paris, and being admitted an advocate, he proceeded to Padua to continue his studies in jurisprudence, and went then to the council of Trent to join his brother, Charles d'Angennes de Rambouillet, who was there at the time as bishop of Le Mans. Returning to Paris again, he was made into a conseiller d'église au parlement de Paris (church councilor in the parliament of Paris) by Charles IX in 1566; Three years later, the king sent him as an ambassador to Cosimo de' Medici, duke of Florence, and on his return made him conseiller d'état (state councilor), and in 1570 sent him to Rome on an embassy to Pope Pius V.

In 1577, Henry III gave him the office of président en la cinquième chambre des enquêtes (president in the fifth chamber of investigations), and some months afterwards, in 1578, made him bishop of Noyon. In 1582, he attended a general assembly of the Gallican church, the next year a council held at Reims, and two years afterwards, in 1585, a second general assembly of the Gallican church at Paris, when he defended its liberties in the presence of the king. After the death of his brother the cardinal, he was translated to the see of Le Mans, in the year 1588.

== Mission to Pope Sixtus V on behalf of Henry III ==
As D'Angennes was a man of great experience and prudence, Henry III of France employed him in a difficult mission to Pope Sixtus V. Henry had ordered the Duc de Guise, and a short time afterwards, 24 December 1588, his brother, the Cardinal de Guise, to be assassinated, and the Cardinal de Bourbon, and the Archbishop of Lyon, to be apprehended and imprisoned in the château d'Amboise. The fury of the Catholic League was excited to the highest pitch by the murder of their two chiefs the princes of Lorraine, and the greatest disorders ensued all through France. The king, believing that he could allay these troubles if he obtained absolution from Rome for the assassination of the cardinal, sent two ambassadors to Sixtus V, who was violently irritated at the deed. When they asked for absolution for the king, the pope replied that the king had violated not only the ecclesiastical immunities and the privileges of the sacred college, but also the laws of God and man, by causing a cardinal to be cruelly massacred, and retaining in prison two of the most considerable prelates of the church, as if they were mere seculars, and that the king must prove the sincerity of his repentance by setting the Cardinal de Bourbon and the Archbishop of Lyon at liberty, who were subject to no other jurisdiction than his own. He then proceeded to assemble a congregation expressly to examine into the affair of the murder of the Cardinal de Guise. The Duc de Mayenne deputed to it his chancellor Jacques de Diou, to carry his complaint to Rome of the crime which had been just committed. The League also sent two agents to call upon his holiness to take the Catholics of France under his protection, and join in avenging the outrage done to the church, and also to represent with what little sincerity Henry had carried on the war against the Calvinists. The king, to refute these statements, and to justify himself with the pope, sent to Rome Claude d'Angennes, "of the beloved family of Rambouillet, a man of profound learning and singular eloquence", who arrived there on the 23d of February, 1589.

During this visit, D'Angennes had four audiences with the pope on the subject of his mission, and expressed these remarkable sentiments. He represented to his holiness, that the king was full of zeal for the Catholic faith, that the Cardinal de Guise was convicted of the crime of rebellion, and in this case the ecclesiastics of France, whatever might be their rank, were subject to secular jurisdiction, and particularly the peers of the kingdom, who had no other judges than the parlement of Paris, composed of peers, officers of the crown, and the ordinary judges, and if the king had derogated from the formalities of justice in the punishment which he had inflicted on the cardinal, this was a matter which concerned his parlement, and that by this he had not infringed any ecclesiastical privileges. The pope replied, that the death of the Duc de Guise did not concern him, and the king had a right to punish him; but he demanded satisfaction for the death of the cardinal, who was the subject of the holy see, and not of the king, as the cardinals were immediately under the pontifical jurisdiction, and irresponsible to any secular power; and the same was the case with archbishops and bishops, as it was expressly stated in the oath of their consecration. The bishop answered, that if ecclesiastics were subject to the pontifical authority as far as regarded their ministry, yet it was not so as to their property or their abodes; in these points they were obliged to obey their princes, and came under their jurisdiction.

In the third audience D'Angennes represented to the pope the privileges and liberties of the Gallican church, and declared that they protected the kings of France from the excommunications of the pope, at which Sixtus took fire, and threatened, if he did not receive satisfaction on the subject of the prisoners, to excommunicate the king and arrest the Bishop of Le Mans. A fourth audience, on the 13th of March, was equally fruitless; the pope continued to refuse the absolution required, until the Cardinal de Bourbon and the Archbishop of Lyon were released. The matter remained undecided, until the Duc de Mayenne, having now become the chief of the League, dispatched another deputy to Rome on the 7th of April, on hearing that the pope might at last grant absolution to Henry, and sent directions to the other representatives, if the pope should grant absolution, to protest against it and demand an act of their protestation, in the name of himself and the other heads of the League. When Sixtus was informed of the orders sent to the agents of the League, he was so alarmed, lest the Catholics of France should withdraw from their obedience to the papal authority, that he published in the consistory a decree or monitorium, in which he exhorted and commanded Henry, in ten days from the date of the publication of the monitorium, to set at liberty the Cardinal de Bourbon and the Archbishop of Lyon, and thirty days after their liberation to inform him thereof, else he declared him and all his abettors and adherents excommunicated, struck with all the censures contained in the sacred canons, and in the bull which was read on Holy Thursday. He also cited the king to appear before him in person, or by capable representatives, and render an account of the murder of the Cardinal de Guise and of the imprisonment of the Cardinal de Bourbon and the Archbishop of Lyon. This decree, though it was passed in the consistory on the 5th of May, was not published at the usual churches in Rome until the 24th. The ministers of France left that city as soon as the decree was determined upon; the Bishop of Le Mans embarked at Leghorn, and after a fight with some pirates arrived safely at Marseille. A little more than two months after this excommunication, Jacques Clément, the Dominican, assassinated Henry III. Thus, though d'Angennes was received several times into Sixtus' presence, he failed to achieve absolution for the king.

== Instructing Henry IV ==
In 1593, Henry IV, having at last determined to abjure the Protestant faith, and "enter the bosom of the Catholic, Apostolic, and Roman church," summoned several of his prelates and theologians to instruct him on those points which had kept him separated from the church, and hold conferences with him on these matters. The first of these conferences took place on the morning of the 23d of July; and one of the prelates who attended it was d'Angennes. They discussed certain points, the king made objections, but at last he expressed himself satisfied, and thanked the bishops for having taught him what he knew not before, and protested that he recognised in his conversion the goodness and power of God. The 25th was appointed as the day on which the king should make a solemn abjuration of his errors, and receive the absolution of his heresy and of the censures of the church. On the 24th the papal legate published a declaration, in which he maintained that "Henri de Bourbon, self-styled king of France and Navarre, but declared by the pope Sixtus V heretic, relapsed, impenitent, chief, abettor, and public defender of heretics, could not be absolved by any one but the pope of the penalties incurred by relapsed and impenitent heretics, and therefore that the act of the prelates whom he had assembled would be null and void". Notwithstanding this, on the appointed day, the Archbishop of Bourges received the king's abjuration in the church of the abbey of St. Denis, and after confession granted him absolution, absolving him from the crime of heresy and apostacy, reuniting him to the church of Rome, and admitting him to the sacraments. D'Angennes was one of the prelates who were present at this ceremony, but as the archbishop had granted him absolution, "saving the authority of the holy apostolic chair," Henry sent a solemn embassy to render in his name obedience to the pope, Clement VIII, and ask for the confirmation of the absolution which he had received from the bishops. D'Angennes was one of the deputies, and at their head was Louis de Gonzague, Duke of Nevers. Clement refused to receive the duke as an ambassador from the King of France, and after much difficulty consented to admit him into Rome as a private person, as an Italian, and Catholic prince. The duke entered the city on the 21st of November, and after five unsuccessful audiences left it in the January of the succeeding year. The pope refused absolution to one who he said had formerly applied to the holy chair on the same subject, and after embracing the Catholic faith had abandoned it, and returned to his errors. He alluded to what had happened in the time of Gregory XIII, when Charles IX compelled the King of Navarre to write to the pope, and abjure his heresy.

D'Angennes, before he left Italy, published a small treatise to justify the conduct of the French bishops. He argued from the authority of most famous canonists, "that the ordinary, who has the power so to do, is permitted by the canons to absolve from excommunication and all other censures, when there is a legitimate cause which prevents the penitent from throwing himself at the feet of the sovereign pontiff. He showed that this was the case with the king, as his presence in France was demanded by the necessity of his affairs and the plots of his enemies; and therefore the prelates of France were justified in absolving the king 'ad cautelam' by way of precaution, provided they acknowledged, as they were willing to do, the supreme authority of the pontiff".

== Later life, death, and legacy ==
D'Angennes established a seminary at Le Mans, and died in that city on 15 May 1601. Jacques Lelong, in his Bibliothèque Historique de la France, lists the following works under the name of Claude d'Angennes:

1. "Remontrance du Clergé faite au Roi par l'Evêque de Noyon, en l'Assemblée de 1585," 8vo. Paris, 1585.
2. "Remontrance du Clergé de France, faite à Folambray, en 1596, par l'Evêque du Mans," 8vo.. Paris, 1596.
3. "Avis de Rome, tiré des Lettres de l'Evêque du Mans, écrites le 15 de Mars à Henri de Valois, jadis Roi de France," 8vo. Paris, 1589. This is an extract from the letters which the bishop wrote touching his conferences with Sixtus V. on the subject of the murder of the cardinal. The author of the Reflections on these letters infers from them that it is allowable for true Catholics, considering the hypocrisy of Henry III, to proceed to any extremities to avenge the murder.
4. "Lettre au Roi Henri III.;" dated 15 March 1589, and published in the "Mémoires du Duc d'Espernon," 4to. Paris, 1626. This letter contains an account of all that passed in the audiences which D'Angennes had with the pope relative to the death of the Cardinal de Guise.
5. "Lettre de l'Evêque du Mans, avec la Réponse à elle faite par un Docteur en Théologie, en laquelle est répondu à ces Deux Doutes: Si on peut suivre en Sûreté de Conscience le Parti du Roi de Navarre, et le reconnoître pour Roi, et si l'Acte de Frère Jacques Clément doit être approuvé en Conscience, et s'il est louable ou non," 8vo. Paris, 1589. The doctor of theology here mentioned is the notorious Jean Boucher, curé de Benoît, the seditious preacher of the League, who in his answer to the letter attacked Henry III. with his usual virulence.
6. A manuscript work, which in the time of Lelong was in the library of M. Févret de Fontette, conseiller au parlement de Dijon, entitled "Traité de la Puissance du Pope envers les Rois, par R. P. en Dieu, Messire Claude d'Angennes de Rambouillet, Evêque du Mans." In this work the author maintains that popes have no right to depose kings and release subjects from their oath of fidelity to them; yet the pope, and even bishops, may correct and excommunicate kings, when they neglect to obey them in things spiritual. (Courvaisier, Histoire des Evêques du Mans; Gallia Christiana, tom. ix. p. 1026,; Thuanus, Historia sui Temporis, lib. 94, 95.; Davila, Historia delle Guerre Civili, b. 10.; Histoire Ecclésiastique pour servir de Continuation à celle de Fleury, liv. clxi, ch. 54., where Claude d'Angennes is confounded with Charles, liv. clxxviii.ch. 89–110., liv.clxxx. ch. 58–103.
