= Jean Cottereau =

French civil servant (1458–1530)

Jean Cottereau (French pronunciation: [ʒɑ̃ kɔtʁo]; 1458 – February 8, 1530) was the royal treasurer to King Louis XII of France. In 1509, he purchased the old castle in Maintenon, and rebuilt it, transforming it into the Château de Maintenon. Later, it was remade into a fashionable country house for Madame de Maintenon, the second wife of Louis XIV.

Clément Marot's verse epitaphs, "De Messire Jean Cotereau, chevalier, seigneur de Maintenon", are included in his Cimitière (nos. viii, ix, and x). In his Mémoires d'Outre-Tombe (published 1849/50), François-René de Chateaubriand wrote that "Marot, in his Cimetière, maintains that Cottereau was too honest a man for a financier. One of Cottereau's daughters brought the Maintenon domain into the d'Angennes family". Specifically, Isabelle Cottereau, who married Jacques d'Angennes and was the mother of twelve children, including Charles d'Angennes, Claude d'Angennes and Nicolas d'Angennes.
