= Charles d'Angennes de Rambouillet =

French Roman Catholic bishop and cardinal

- Cardinal-Priest of Sant’Eufemia
- Church: Catholic Church
- See: Sant’Eufemia
- In office: 20 November 1570 – 23 March 1587
- Predecessor: Giovanni Aldobrandini
- Successor: Title suppressed
- Other post: Bishop of Le Mans (1556-1587)
- Previous post: Cardinal-Priest of San Simeone Profeta (1570)

Orders
- Created cardinal: 17 May 1570 by Pope Pius V

Personal details
- Born: 31 October 1530 Rambouillet, Kingdom of France
- Died: 23 March 1587 (aged 56) Corneto, Papal States

Charles d'Angennes de Rambouillet (October 31, 1530 – March 23, 1587) was a French Roman Catholic bishop and cardinal.

== Biography ==
Charles d'Angennes de Rambouillet was born in the Château de Rambouillet on 30 October 1530, the second of nine sons of Jacques d'Angennes, seigneur of Rambouillet, governor of Dauphiné, and Isabelle Cottereau, who was the daughter of royal treasurer of France Jean Cottereau.

As a young man, he spent a long period of time at the court of the King of France, and was sent abroad on several embassies. A cleric of Le Mans, he became a counselor of the French king.

On 27 July 1556 he was elected Bishop of Le Mans; he was subsequently consecrated as a bishop. He did not take possession of his diocese until 1560. During his time as Bishop of Le Mans, his diocese was invaded by Calvinists who attacked Le Mans Cathedral.

Charles IX of France named him ambassador to Pope Pius V. He participated in the Council of Trent from 13 November 1562 until its closing. From 1568 on, he was the French ambassador to the Holy See.

Pope Pius V made him a cardinal priest in the consistory of 17 May 1570. He received the red hat and the titular church of San Simeone Profeta on 9 June 1570. On 20 November 1570 he opted for the titular church of Sant'Euphemia.

He participated in the papal conclave of 1572 that elected Pope Gregory XIII. The new pope named him papal legate to Umbria in 1578. He later participated in the papal conclave of 1585 that elected Pope Sixtus V. He was made governor of Corneto in 1587.

== Death and legacy ==
He died in Corneto on 23 March 1587, and was buried in Corneto in the Church of San Francesco of the Friars Minor of the Observants. A nineteenth-century account of his life reports that "it was suspected that he was poisoned by his domestics, to whom he had left the greater part of his property by his will, but the matter was never cleared up". He was succeeded as Bishop by his younger brother, Claude d'Angennes.

Jacques Lelong, in his Bibliothèque Historique de la France, tom. iii. No. 30124, 30125, attributes these two manuscripts to de Ramboullet:

1. "Ambassade du Cardinal de Rambouillet à Rome, en 1568, fol., which is in the royal library of Paris.
2. "Dépêches de l'Ambassade de M. le Cardinal de Rambouillet à Rome, depuis le 19 Juillet, 1568, jusqu'au 28 Août, 1570", fol. 2 vols. (Courvaisier, Histoire des Evêques du Mans; Aubery, Vies des Cardinaux; Ciaconius, Vitæ et Res gestæ Pontificum Romanorum et Cardinalium.)
