= Barnabé Brisson =

French jurist, politician and humanist (1531–1591)

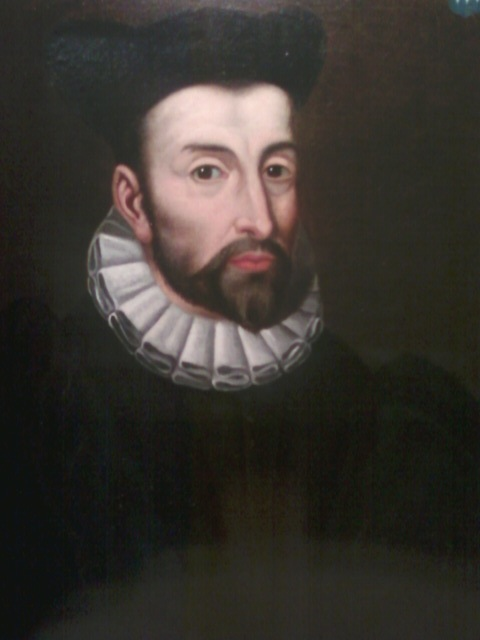
Barnabé Brisson

Barnabé Brisson (Latinised: Barnabas Brissonius; 1531 – 15 November 1591) was a French jurist and politician.

== Biography ==
Born as the son of the king's lieutenant in Fontenay-le-Comte, Vendée, Brisson studied law in Orléans, Bourges and finally Poitiers, where he stayed on as an advocate. Between 1553 and 1556, he moved on to Paris, where he swiftly gained repute for his learning and rhetorical skills.

Charles IX named him Advocate General of the Parlement in 1573. His successor, Henry III, put particular trust in Brisson, who was made first Fiscal in 1573, promoted to Président à mortier in 1580, appointed Sixth President of the Parlement in 1588 and entrusted with several diplomatical missions.

As the French Wars of Religion flamed up again, Brisson remained in Paris after the royalist judges on the Parlement fled the city on 16 January 1589, following the King, who had fled on May 13, 1588. Next day, the Seize ("sixteen"), a group of League notables that now ruled Paris, installed Brisson as First President of the Parlement in replacement of Achille de Harlay. As a politique, Brisson sought to mediate between the warring factions. The Seize, however, soon began to mistrust him, because they considered him to remain loyal to Henry. Consequently, they had him sentenced to death by a special court and executed by hanging in 1591.

== Scholarly work ==
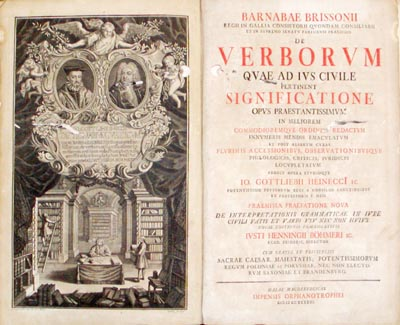
The frontispiece of De Verborum.

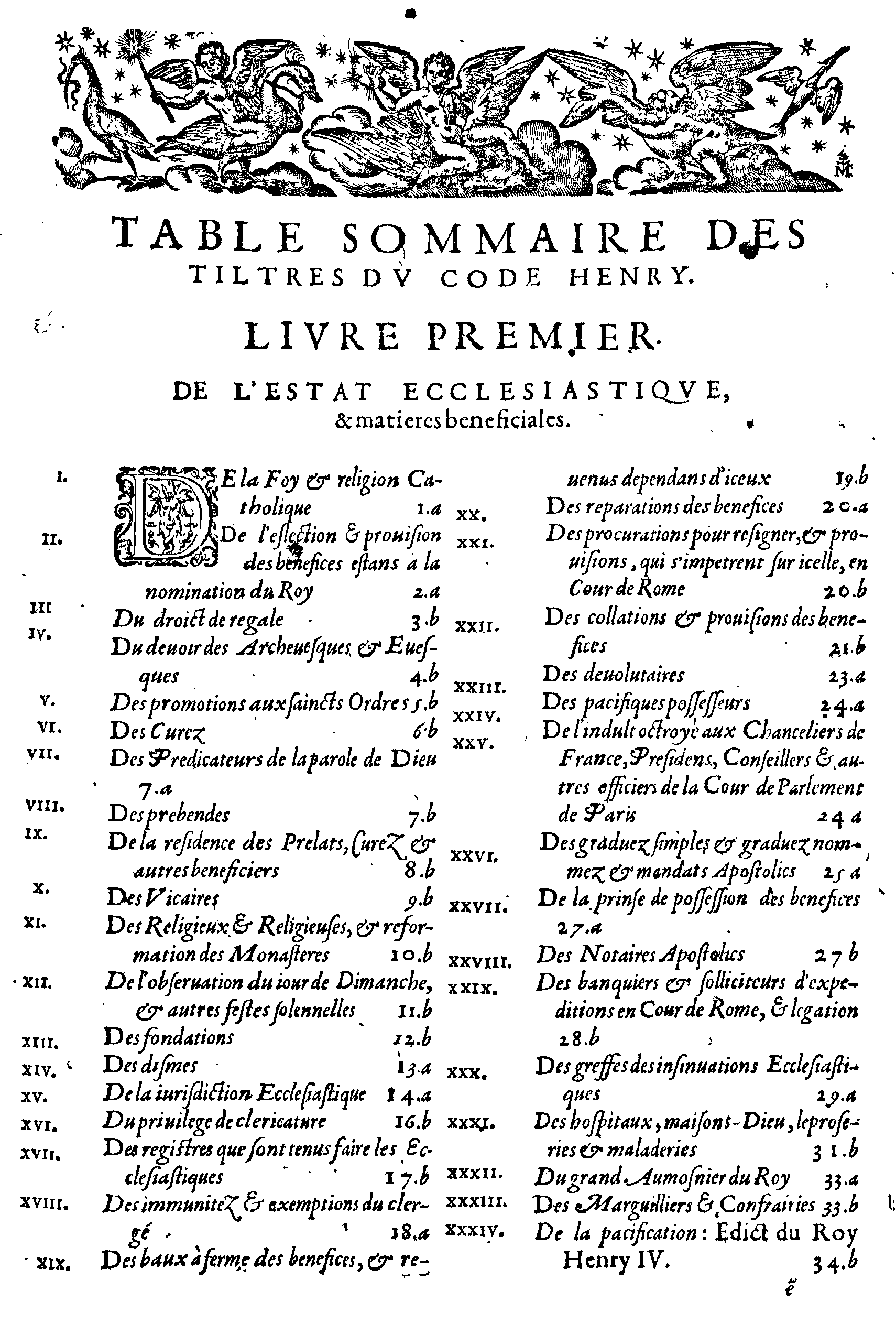
The first page of the table of contents of the Code Henri III.

Brisson never held academic office. Despite this, he is – with Contius, Balduinus, Cujacius, Hotmannus and Donellus – among the group of 16th century French jurists that brought Humanist jurisprudence to its peak.

His principal work is De Verborum Quae ad Jus Civile Pertinent Significatione (1559), a two-folio dictionary of Justinian legal terminology that saw 17 reeditions (often much amended) up until 1805. De Verborum was the standard legal dictionary of the time, and for centuries remained an authoritative source for lexicographers.

Among his other works, the following warrant particular mention. The Code Henri III was an influential 1587 compilation of the laws of France. It saw numerous reeditions, as did Brisson's works on pre-Justinian Roman law. These include De formulis et solennibus populi Romani verbis, a comprehensive compilation of Roman legal terminology.
