= Jacques Lelong =

French bibliographer

- Born: 19 April 1665
- Died: 13 August 1721 (aged 56)
- Occupation: bibliographer
- Notable work: Bibliotheca Sacra (1709); Bibliothèque historique de la France (1719)

Jacques Lelong (occasionally Jacobus Longus; 19 April 1665 – 13 August 1721) was a French bibliographer born in Paris. He joined the Knights of Malta at the age of ten, but later joined the Oratorians.

He was a priest of the Oratory, and was librarian to the establishment of the Order in Paris, where he spent his life in seclusion. He first published a Bibliotheca Sacra (1709), an index of all the editions of the Bible, then a Bibliothèque historique de la France (1719), a volume of considerable size, containing 17,487 items to which Lelong sometimes appends useful notes.

His work is far from complete. He vainly hoped that his friend and successor Father Desmolets would continue it; but it was resumed by Charles-Marie Fevret de Fontette, a councillor of the parlement of Dijon, who spent fifteen years of his life and a great deal of money in rewriting the Bibliothèque historique. The first two volumes (1768 and 1769) contained as many as 29,143 items. Fevret de Fontette died on 16 February 1772, leaving the third volume almost finished. It appeared in 1772, thanks to Barbaud de La Bruyère, who later brought out the 4th and 5th volumes (1775 and 1778). In this new edition the Bibliothèque historique is a work of reference of the highest order; it is still of great value.
