= Alphonse d'Ornano =

Marshal of France

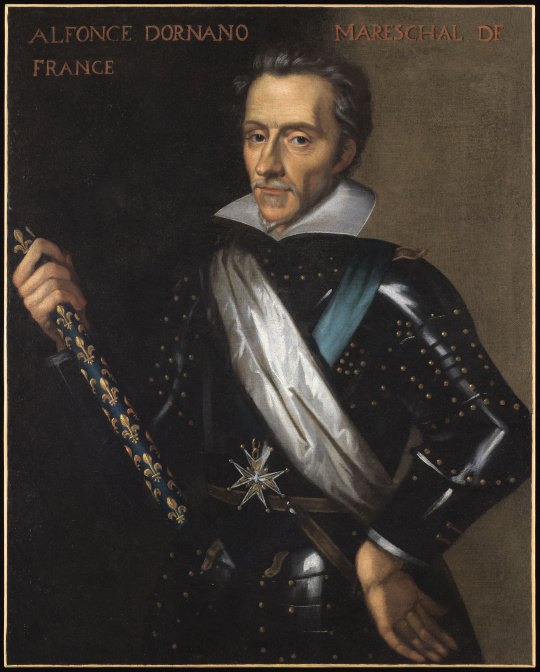
Alphonse d'Ornano

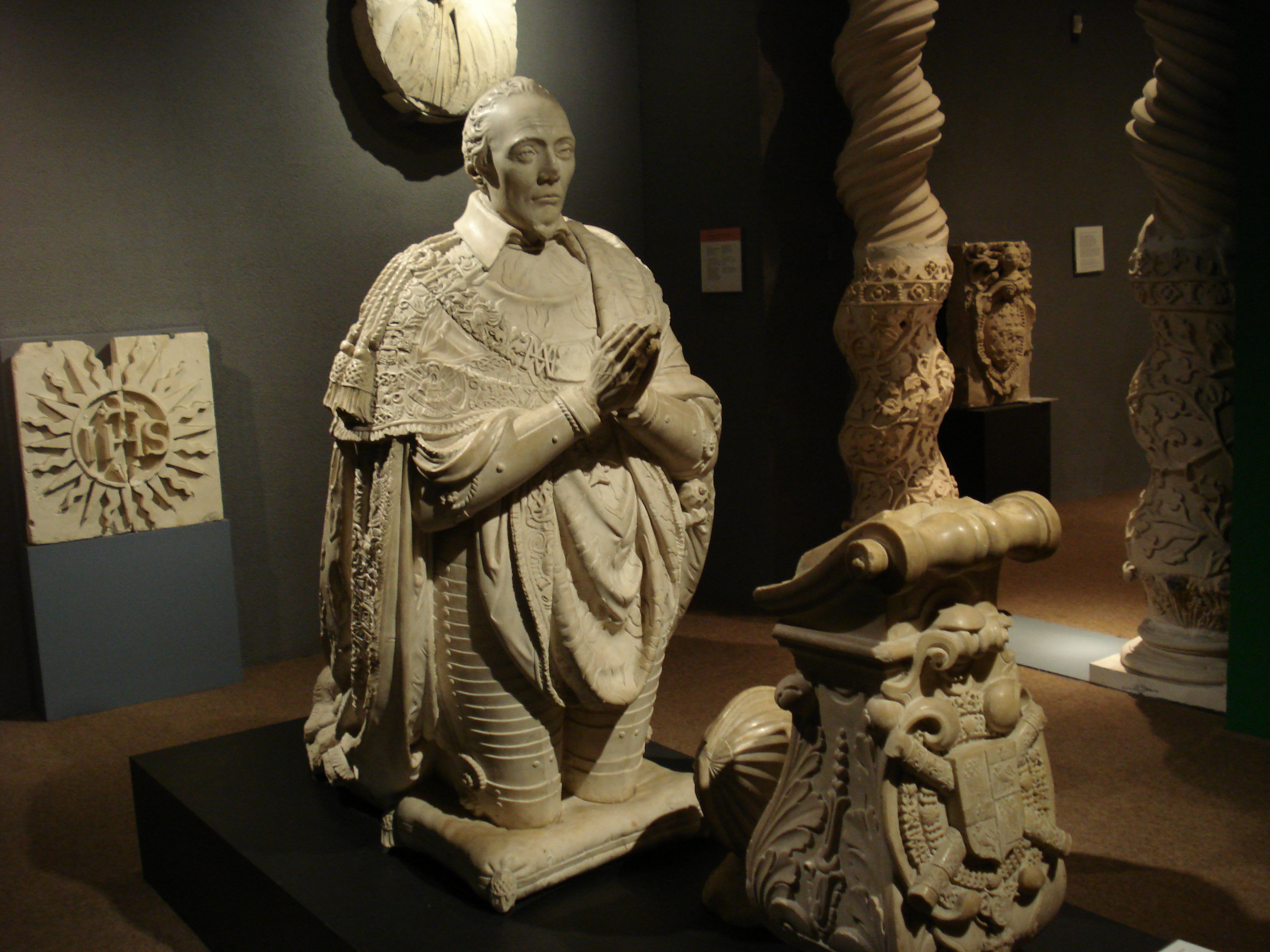
his marble tomb in Bordeaux

Alphonse d'Ornano (1548 - 20/21 January 1610) was a Marshal of France, active during the French Wars of Religion.

== Biography ==
He was born in Bastelica, Corsica, the son of Sampiero Corso and Vannina d'Ornano.

He was raised at the court of Henry II as a page of honor to the princes of France. He remained always very devoted to the party of King Henry II, after whose death he followed that of Henry IV, and contributed to bringing the cities of Lyon, Grenoble, and Valence back under the King's authority.

He was made a Knight of the Order of the Holy Spirit on 7 January 1595, Lieutenant-General of the Dauphiné and Marshal of France on 20 September 1597. After this, he was appointed Lieutenant-General in Guyenne in October 1597 and mayor of Bordeaux from 1599 to 1610.

He died of kidney stones in Paris, at the Hôtel de Balagny, on 21 January 1610, at the age of 62.
His body was taken to Bordeaux to be buried in the Church of Our Lady of Mercy, under a marble tomb.

=== Marriage and children ===
He married on 10 June 1576 with Marguerite-Louise de Grasse de Pontevez de Flassans, and had 4 sons and 3 daughters, including :

- Jean-Baptiste d'Ornano (1581-1626), also Marshal of France, no issue.
- Henri François Alphonse (1590-1622), killed at the Siege of Montpellier.
