= Siege of La Fère =

- Part of Franco-Prussian War
| Date | 15 November – 27 November 1870 |
| Location | La Fère, Aisne, France |
| Result | German Victory |

Belligerents
| French Republic | North German Confederation: Prussia |

Commanders and leaders
| Jacques Ferdinand Planche | Major General Von Zhilinsky |

Units involved
| Garde Mobile; Franc-tireur | Brigade Infantry No. 4 |

Strength
| 2,000 Infantry and about 70 artillery pieces | Unknown |

Casualties and losses
| 2,000 people were captured, 113 garrison guns of all sizes, along with ammunition, 5,000 personal weapons sets and many military reserves were seized | Unknown |

The Siege of La Fère took place during the Franco-Prussian War from 15 November until 26 November 1870, at the fortress of La Fère in France. French troops stationed at La Fère under the command of Captain Jacques Ferdinand Planche resisted the siege from the Imperial German Army, but surrendered the fort after eleven days on 26 November 1870, which resulted in a German victory. During the siege, the German army captured thousands of prisoners, most of whom were Garde Mobile soldiers, and took control of many French weapons. The German shelling of La Fère took place over the course of two days and severely damaged the town. After the Germans captured La Fère, they used cannons to arm the stronghold of Amiens.

Although La Fère was a small fortress, it still posed a threat to the rear of the German armies advancing upon Amiens. The Brigade Infantry No. 4 of the Corps of Prussia, under the command of Major General von Zhilinsky, was tasked with besieging La Fère. On 15 November, 1870, after a long journey from Metz, the Germans reached La Fère to blockade the fortress. The French garrison attempted strong assaults on the German army to no avail.

One example of a failed assault took place on 20 November, when six French companies attacked the enemy at Mennessis on the right bank of the Oise river but were crushed by a German battalion. The commanding officer of La Fère decided to send all artillery materials to Lille but locals opposed the idea. On the night of 24 November, the German siege army arrived from Soissons and installed 32 heavy guns and seven batteries on the heights to the east of the fortress. The next day on 25 November, German shelling began. Facing the tremendous destructive power of the German barrage, the French garrison resisted fiercely, but German artillery (including 6 mortars) destroyed their opposing artillery and set the town ablaze.

Under siege by the German 1st Army, La Fère was in a very difficult situation, and Captain Planche capitulated. On 26 November, the French garrison surrendered, leaving the German artillery unscathed. German troops entered La Fère on 27 November.
