= Passy, Yonne =

Passy
- Commune
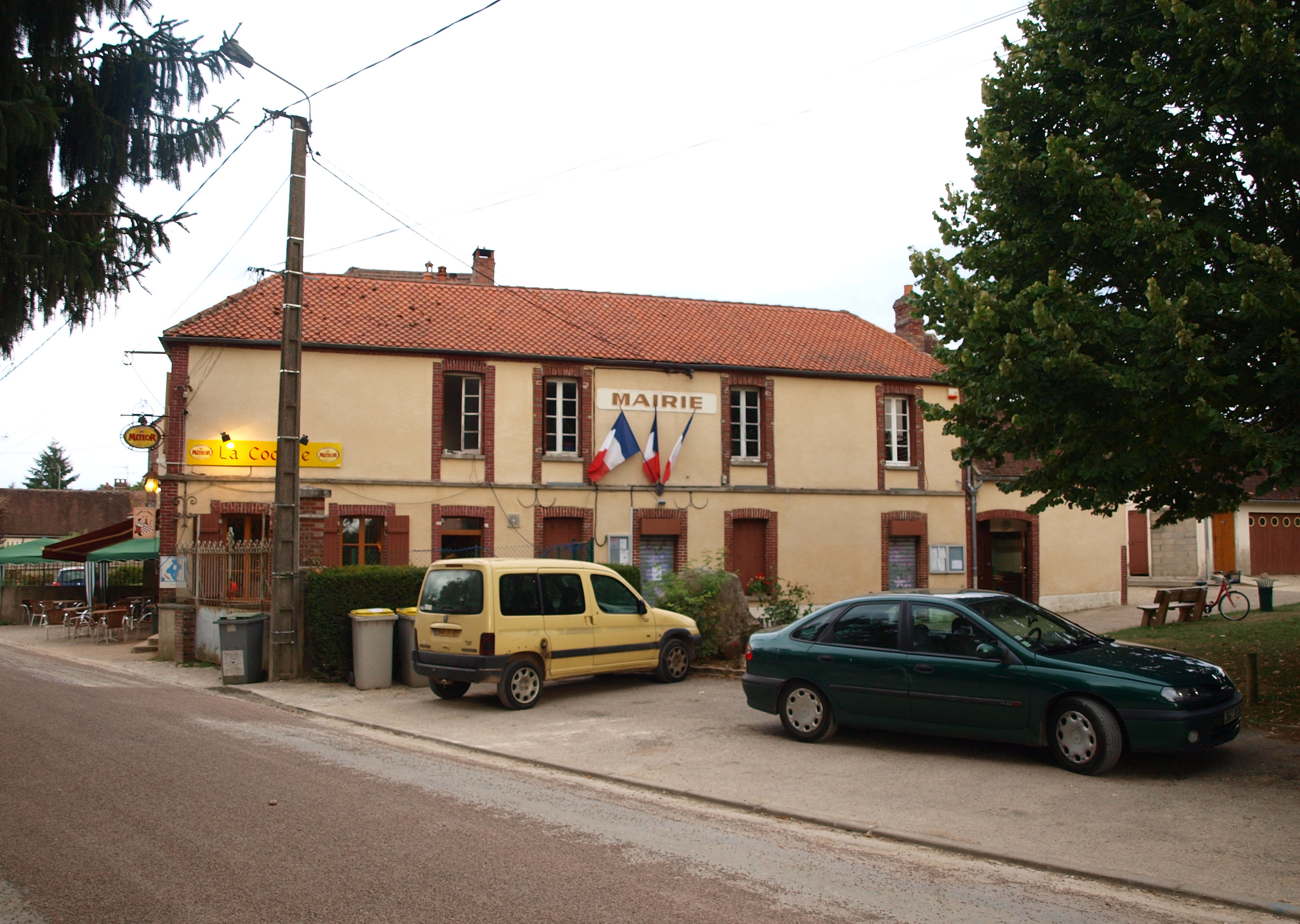
- The town hall in Passy
- Location of Passy
- Location within France Location within Bourgogne-Franche-Comté
- Coordinates: 48°06′38″N 3°18′12″E
- Country: France
- Region: Bourgogne-Franche-Comté
- Department: Yonne
- Arrondissement: Sens
- Canton: Villeneuve-sur-Yonne
- Intercommunality: CA Grand Sénonais

Government
  - Mayor (2020–2026): Pascal Crou
- Area^{1}: 5.74 km^{2} (2.22 sq mi)
- Highest elevation: 185 m (607 ft)
- Lowest elevation: 69 m (226 ft)
- Population (2023): 324
  - Density: 56.4/km^{2} (146/sq mi)
- Time zone: UTC+01:00 (CET)
  - Summer (DST): UTC+02:00 (CEST)
- INSEE/Postal code: 89291 /89510
- ^{1} French Land Register data, which excludes lakes, ponds, glaciers > 1 km^{2} (0.386 sq mi or 247 acres) and river estuaries.

Passy (French pronunciation: [pasi]) is a commune in the Yonne department in Bourgogne-Franche-Comté in north-central France.

== Geography ==
The altitude of the commune of Passy ranges between 69 and 185 meters. The area of Passy is 5.74 square kilometers. The nearest larger towns are Véron (2 km to the north), Villeneuve-sur-Yonne (3 km to the south) and Sens (10 km to the north).

== Population ==
Historical population
Year	Pop.	±% p.a.
1968	169	—
1975	219	+3.77%
1982	197	−1.50%
1990	223	+1.56%
1999	301	+3.39%
2007	304	+0.12%
2012	349	+2.80%
2017	342	−0.40%
2023	324	−0.90%
Source: INSEE

== See also ==
- Communes of the Yonne department
