= Dixmont =

Dixmont may refer to:

- Dixmont, Maine, a town in the United States
- Dixmont, Yonne, a commune of the Yonne département, in France
- Dixmont State Hospital, a former psychiatric hospital northwest of Pittsburgh, United States
