= Rousson =

Rousson is the name or part of the name of several communes in France:

- Rousson, former commune of the Cher department, now part of Saint-Loup-des-Chaumes
- Rousson, in the Gard department
- Rousson, in the Yonne department
