= Leslie Caron =

French and American actress and dancer (born 1931)

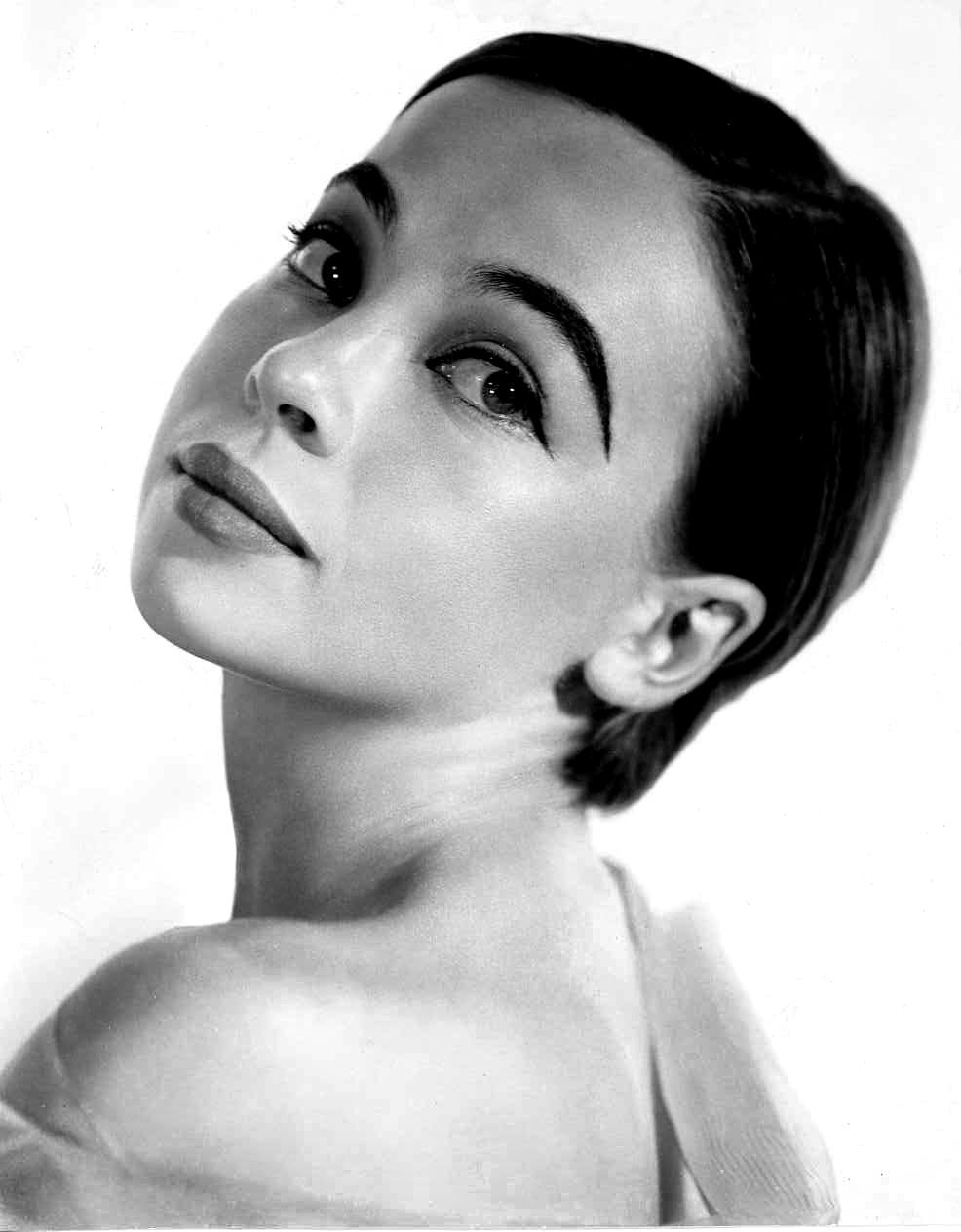
- Caron in 1960
- Born: Leslie Claire Margaret Caron; 1 July 1931 (age 95); Boulogne-sur-Seine, Paris, France
- Citizenship: France; United States
- Occupations: Actress; dancer
- Years active: 1951–2020
- Spouses: Geordie Hormel (m. 1951; div. 1954) Peter Hall (m. 1956; div. 1965) Michael Laughlin (m. 1969; div. 1980)
- Children: Christopher Hall; Jennifer Caron Hall

Leslie Claire Margaret Caron (French: [lɛsli kaʁɔ̃]; born 1 July 1931) is a French and American former actress and dancer. She is the recipient of a Golden Globe Award, two BAFTA Awards and a Primetime Emmy Award, in addition to nominations for two Academy Awards. Caron is one of the last surviving stars of the Golden Age of Hollywood.

Caron began her career as a ballerina. She made her film debut in the musical An American in Paris (1951), followed by roles in The Man with a Cloak (1951), Glory Alley (1952) and The Story of Three Loves (1953), before her role of an orphan in Lili (also 1953), which earned her the BAFTA Award for Best Foreign Actress and garnered nominations for an Academy Award and a Golden Globe Award.

As a leading lady, Caron starred in films such as The Glass Slipper (1955), Daddy Long Legs (1955), Gigi (1958), Fanny (1961), Guns of Darkness (1962), The L-Shaped Room (1962), Father Goose (1964) and A Very Special Favor (1965). For her role as a single pregnant woman in The L-Shaped Room, Caron, in addition to receiving a second Academy Award nomination, won the Golden Globe Award for Best Actress in a Motion Picture – Drama and a second BAFTA Award.

Caron's other roles include Is Paris Burning? (1966), The Man Who Loved Women (1977), Valentino (1977), Damage (1992), Funny Bones (1995), Chocolat (2000) and Le Divorce (2003). In 2007, she won the Primetime Emmy Award for Outstanding Guest Actress in a Drama Series for portraying heiress and rape victim Lorraine Delmas in Law & Order: Special Victims Unit.

== Early life and family ==
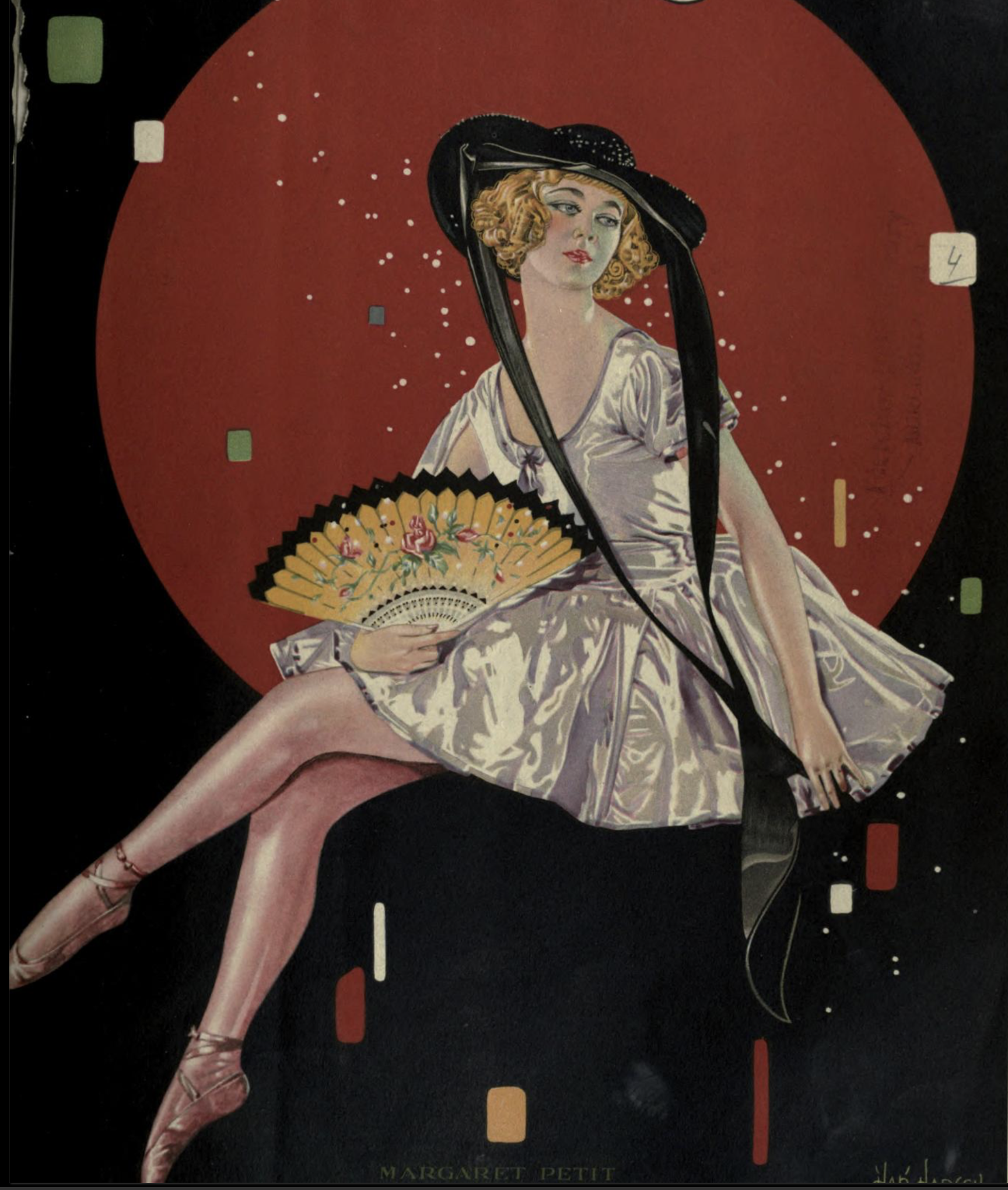
Illustration of Caron's mother, the ballet dancer Margaret Petit, on the front cover of Theatre Magazine in October 1921

Caron was born in Boulogne-sur-Seine, Seine (now Boulogne-Billancourt, Hauts-de-Seine), the daughter of (divorcee) Margaret (née Petit), an American dancer on Broadway, and Jean Claude Caron, a French chemist, pharmacist, perfumer and boutique owner who founded the artisanal perfumier Guermantes. While her older brother, Dr Aimery Caron, became a chemist like their father, Leslie was prepared for a performing career from childhood by her mother, who took her out of education at age fourteen. Her great-grandfather, Ernest Caron was a distinguished Parisian politician of the Belle Époque and her grandmother Andrée Caron was a grandchild of Armand Savalle, the global still maker.

Caron attended an elite convent school whose students typically married wealthy men, but her family lost its wealth during World War II and could not provide a dowry. "My mother said: 'There's only one profession that leads you to marrying money and becoming a princess or duchess, and that's ballet' ", Caron recalled. "My grandfather whispered heavily: 'Margaret, you want your daughter to be a whore?' I heard it. This has always followed me."

"My mother died of" the lost fortune, Caron said. Having grown up poor, Margaret Caron became depressed and an alcoholic from being no longer wealthy, and committed suicide in her 60s.

== Career ==
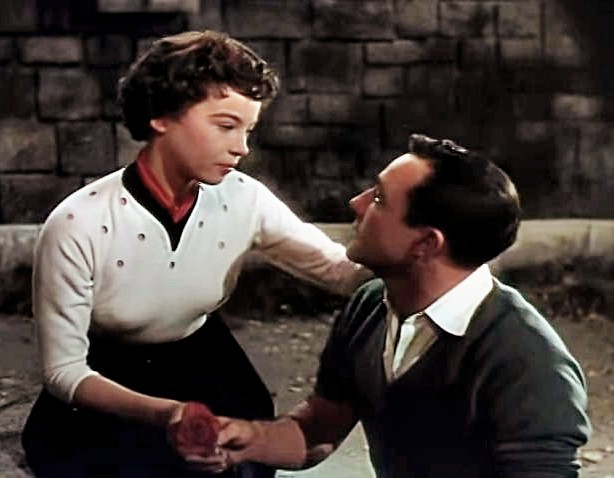
Leslie Caron and Gene Kelly in An American in Paris (1951).

Caron was a ballerina. Gene Kelly discovered her in the Roland Petit company "Ballet des Champs Elysées" and cast her to appear opposite him in the musical An American in Paris (1951), a role for which a pregnant Cyd Charisse was originally cast. The prosperity, sunshine and abundance of California was a cultural shock to Caron. She had lived in Paris during the German occupation, which left her malnourished and anemic. She later remarked how nice people were in comparison to wartime Paris, in which poverty and deprivation had caused people to be bitter and violent. She had a friendly relationship with Kelly, who nicknamed her "Lester the Pester" and "kid". Kelly helped the inexperienced Caron—who had never spoken on stage—adjust to filmmaking..

Caron’s role led to a seven-year MGM contract. The films which followed included the musical The Glass Slipper (1955) and the drama The Man with a Cloak (1951), with Joseph Cotten and Barbara Stanwyck. Still, Caron has said of herself: "Unfortunately, Hollywood considers musical dancers as hoofers. Regrettable expression." She also starred in the musicals Lili (1953, receiving an Academy Award for Best Actress nomination), with Mel Ferrer; Daddy Long Legs (1955), with Fred Astaire; and Gigi (1958) with Louis Jourdan and Maurice Chevalier.

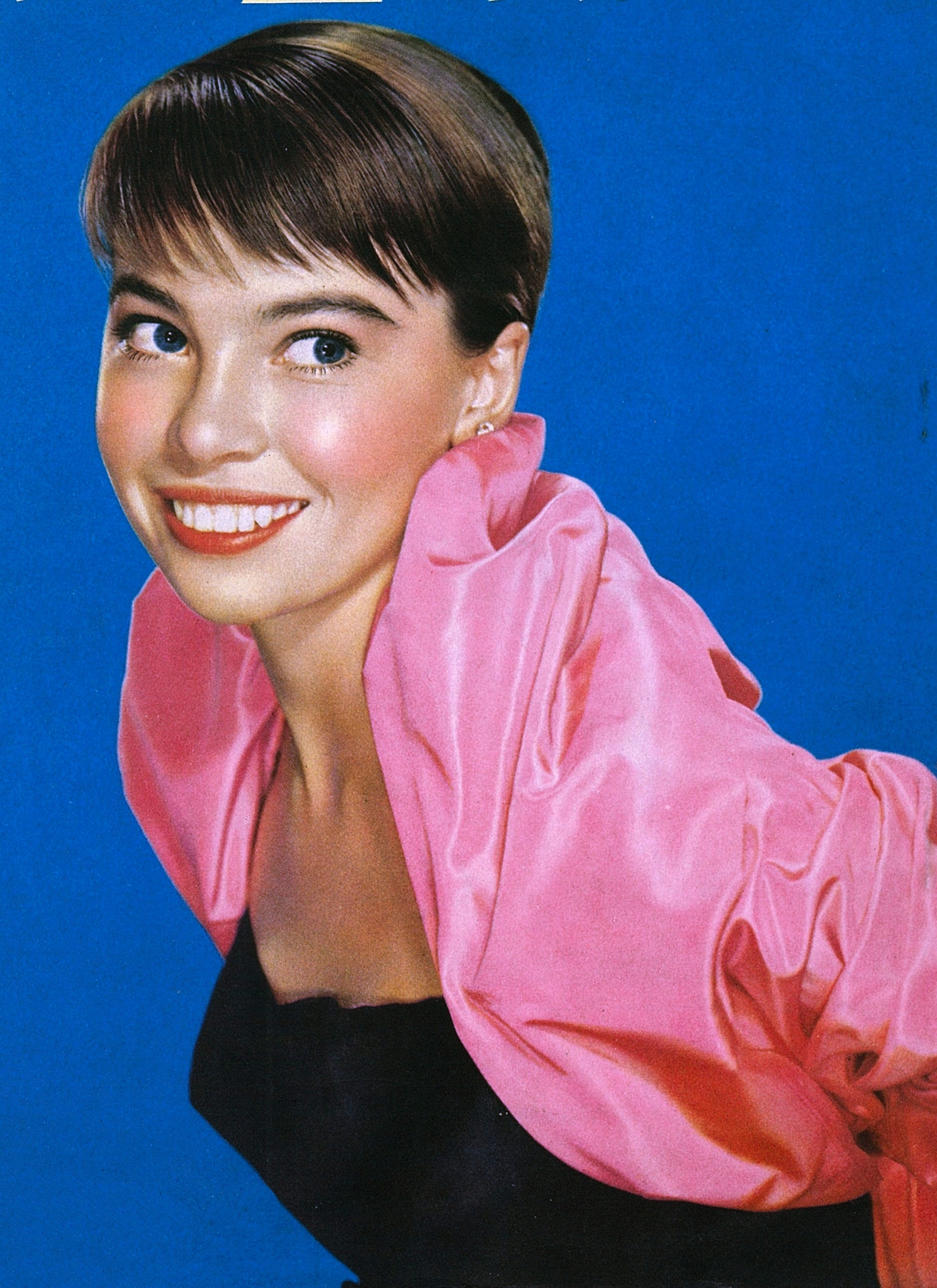
Caron in 1953

Dissatisfied with her career despite her success ("I thought musicals were futile and silly", she said in 2021; "I appreciate them better now"), Caron studied the Stanislavski method. In the 1960s and thereafter, Caron worked in European films as well. For her performance in the British drama The L-Shaped Room (1962), she won the BAFTA Award for Best British Actress and the Golden Globe, and was nominated for the Best Actress Oscar. Her other film assignments in this period included Father Goose (1964) with Cary Grant; Ken Russell's Valentino (1977), in the role of silent-screen legend Alla Nazimova; and Louis Malle's Damage (1992). Sometime in 1970, Caron was one of the many actresses considered for the lead role of Eglantine Price in Disney's Bedknobs and Broomsticks, losing the role to British actress Angela Lansbury.

In 1967, Caron was a member of the jury of the 5th Moscow International Film Festival (MIFF). In 1989, she was a member of the jury at the 39th Berlin International Film Festival. Caron returned to France in the early 1970s, which she later said was a mistake. "They adore someone who's really British or really American", Caron said, "but somebody who's French and has made it in Hollywood – and I was the only one who had really made it in a big way – they can't forgive".

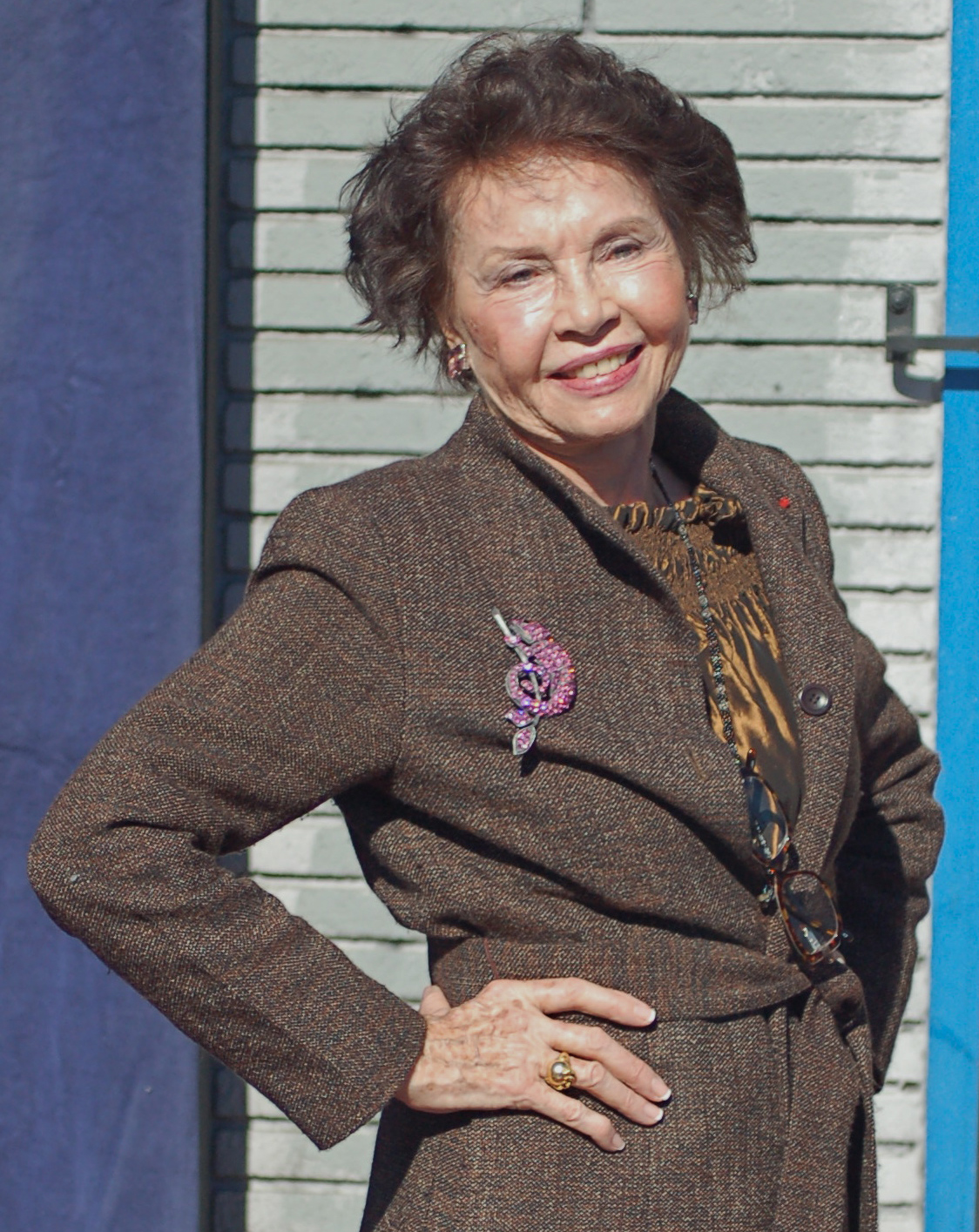
Caron in 2009

During the 1980s, she appeared in several episodes of the soap opera Falcon Crest as Nicole Sauguet. Caron is one of the few actresses from the classic era of MGM musicals who were still active in film — a group that included Rita Moreno, Margaret O'Brien and June Lockhart. Caron's later credits include Funny Bones (1995) with Jerry Lewis and Oliver Platt; The Last of the Blonde Bombshells (2000) with Judi Dench and Cleo Laine; Chocolat (2000) and Le Divorce (2003), directed by James Ivory, with Kate Hudson and Naomi Watts. On June 30, 2003, Caron travelled to San Francisco to appear as the special guest star in The Songs of Alan Jay Lerner: I Remember It Well, a retrospective concert staged by San Francisco's 42nd Street Moon Company.

In 2007, her guest appearance on Law and Order: Special Victims Unit earned her a Primetime Emmy Award. On April 27, 2009, Caron travelled to New York as an honoured guest at a tribute to Alan Jay Lerner and Frederick Loewe at the Paley Center for Media. For her contributions to the film industry, Caron was inducted into the Hollywood Walk of Fame on December 8, 2009, with a motion pictures star located at 6153 Hollywood Boulevard. In February 2010, she played Madame Armfeldt in A Little Night Music at the Théâtre du Châtelet in Paris, which also featured Greta Scacchi and Lambert Wilson. In 2016, Caron appeared in the ITV television series The Durrells (produced by her son Christopher Hall) as the Countess Mavrodaki. Veteran documentarian Larry Weinstein's Leslie Caron: The Reluctant Star premiered at the Toronto International Film Festival (TIFF) on June 28, 2016.

== Personal life ==
=== Marriage and relationships ===
Caron with her son Christopher and Maurice Chevalier on the set of Gigi (1958)

In September 1951, Caron married American George Hormel II, a grandson of George A. Hormel, the founder of the Hormel meat-packing company. They divorced in 1954. During that period, while under contract to MGM, she lived in Laurel Canyon in a Normandie style 1927 mansion near the country store on Laurel Canyon Blvd. One bedroom was all mirrored for her dancing rehearsals.

Her second husband was British theatre director Peter Hall. They married in 1956 and had two children: Christopher John Hall, a television drama producer, and Jennifer Caron Hall, a writer, painter and actress. Her son-in-law, married to Jennifer, is Glenn Wilhide, a producer and screenwriter. Caron had an affair with Warren Beatty in 1961. When she and Hall divorced in 1965, Beatty was named as a co-respondent and was ordered by the London court to pay the costs of the case. In 1969, Caron married Michael Laughlin, the producer of the film Two-Lane Blacktop; the couple divorced in 1980. Caron was also romantically linked to Dutch television actor Robert Wolders from 1994 to 1995.

=== Family and interests ===
From 1981, she rented and lived for a few years in a mill (the "Moulin Neuf") in the French village of Chaumot, Yonne, which had belonged to Prince Francis Xavier of Saxony in the late 18th century and which depended on his princely castle. From June 1993 until September 2009, Caron owned and operated the hotel and restaurant Auberge la Lucarne aux Chouettes (The Owls' Nest), in Villeneuve-sur-Yonne, about 130 km (80 mi) south of Paris. Caron's mother had committed suicide in her 60s; suffering from a lifetime of depression, Caron also considered doing so in 1995. She was hospitalized for a month and began attending Alcoholics Anonymous. Unhappy with the lack of acting opportunities in France, she returned to England in 2013.

In her autobiography, Thank Heaven, she states that she obtained American citizenship in time to vote for Barack Obama for president. In October 2021, she was chosen to receive the Oldie of the Year Award by The Oldie magazine. It had been initially offered to Queen Elizabeth II, who had declined it on the grounds that she did not meet the criteria, even though she was five years older than Caron.

== Acting credits ==
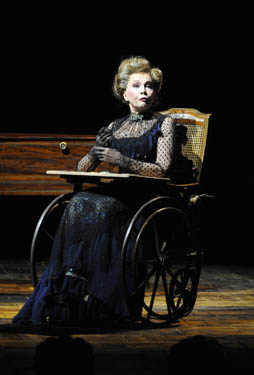
Leslie Caron, A Little Night Music by Stephen Sondheim, théâtre du Châtelet, 2010

=== Film ===
Film
Year	Title	Role	Notes
1951	An American in Paris	Lise Bouvier	
1951	The Man with a Cloak	Madeline Minot	
1952	Glory Alley	Angela Evans	
1953	The Story of Three Loves	Mademoiselle	Segment: "Mademoiselle"
1953	Lili	Lili Daurier	
1955	The Glass Slipper	Ella	
1955	Daddy Long Legs	Julie Andre	
1956	Gaby	Gaby	
1958	Gigi	Gigi	
1958	The Doctor's Dilemma	Mrs. Dubedat	
1959	The Man Who Understood Women	Ann Garantier	
1960	Austerlitz	Mlle de Vaudey	
1960	The Subterraneans	Mardou Fox	
1961	Fanny	Fanny	
1962	Guns of Darkness	Claire Jordan	
1962	The L-Shaped Room	Jane Fosset	
1962	Three Fables of Love	Annie	Segment: "Les deux pigeons"
1964	Father Goose	Catherine	
1965	A Very Special Favor	Dr. Lauren Boullard	
1965	Promise Her Anything	Michele O'Brien	
1966	Is Paris Burning?	Françoise Labé	
1967	The Head of the Family	Paola, Marco's wife	
1970	Madron	Sister Mary	
1971	Chandler	Katherine Creighton	
1976	Surreal Estate	Céleste	
1977	The Man Who Loved Women	Véra	
1977	Valentino	Alla Nazimova	
1978	Crazed	Nicole	
1979	Goldengirl	Dr. Sammy Lee	
1980	All Stars	Lucille Berger	
1981	Chanel Solitaire		uncredited
1982	Imperative	Mother	
1984	Dangerous Moves	Henia Liebskind	
1990	Courage Mountain	Jane Hillary	
1990	Guns	Waitress	
1992	Damage	Elizabeth Prideaux	
1995	Funny Bones	Katie Parker	
1995	Let It Be Me	Marguerite	
1999	The Reef	Regine De Chantelle	
2000	Chocolat	Madame Audel	
2003	Le Divorce	Suzanne de Persand	
2017	The Perfect Age	Marguerite	short movie
2020	A Christmas Carol	The Ghost of Christmas Past (voice)	

=== Television ===
Television
Year	Title	Role	Notes
1959	ITV Play of the Week	Thérèse Tarde	Episode: "The Wild Bird"
1968	Off to See the Wizard	Ella	Episode: "Cinderella's Glass Slipper: Part 1"
1973	Carola	Carola Janssen	TV film
1974	QB VII	Angela Kelno	Miniseries
1978	Docteur Erika Werner	Erika Werner	TV series
1980	Kontrakt	Penelope	TV film
1981	Mon meilleur Noël	La Nuit	Episode: "L'oiseau bleu"
1982	Tales of the Unexpected	Nathalie Vareille	Episode: "Run, Rabbit, Run"
1982	The Unapproachable	Klaudia	TV film
1983	Cinéma 16	Alice	Episode: "Le château faible"
1984	Master of the Game	Solange Dunas	
1986	The Love Boat	Mrs. Duvall	Episode: "The Christmas Cruise"
1987	Falcon Crest	Nicole Sauget	3 episodes
1988	Lenin: The Train	Nadia	TV film
1988	The Man Who Lived at the Ritz	Coco Chanel	TV film
1994	Normandy: The Great Crusade	Osmont, Mary-Louise (voice)	
1996	The Ring	Madame de Saint Marne	
1996	The Great War and the Shaping of the 20th Century	Czarina Aleksandra Romanov (voice)	3 episodes
2000	The Last of the Blonde Bombshells	Madeleine	TV film
2001	Murder on the Orient Express	Sra. Alvarado	
2006	Law & Order: Special Victims Unit	Lorraine Delmas	Episode: "Recall"
2013	Jo	Josette Lenoir	Episode: "Le Marais"
2016–2018	The Durrells	Countess Mavrodaki	6 episodes
2020	Written on the Water	Pauline	TV film

=== Theatre ===
Year	Title	Playwright	Director	Venue	Ref.
1955	Orvet	Jean Renoir	Jean Renoir	Théâtre de la Renaissance, Paris	
1955	Gigi	Anita Loos	Sir Peter Hall	New Theatre, London	
1961	Ondine	Jean Giraudoux	Peter Hall	Aldwych Theatre, London	
1965	Carola	Jean Renoir	Norman Lloyd	Los Angeles	
1975–1981	13, rue de l'amour (Monsieur Chasse)	Georges Feydeau	Basil Langton	US and Australia Tour	
1978	Can-Can	Cole Porter & Abe Burrows	John Bishop	US and Canadian tour	
1983	The Rehearsal	Jean Anouilh	Gillian Lynne	English tour	
1984	On Your Toes	Rodgers and Hart	George Abbott	US tour	
1985	One for the Tango (Apprends-moi Céline)	Maria Pacôme	Pierre Epstein	US tour	
1985	L'inaccessible	Krzysztof Zanussi	Krzysztof Zanussi	Théâtre du Petit Odéon of Paris	
1991	Grand Hotel	Vicki Baum	Tommy Tune	Berlin	
1991	Le martyre de Saint Sebastien	Claude Debussy and Gabriele d'Annunzio	Michael Tilson Thomas	London Symphony Orchestra	
1995	George Sand et Chopin	Bruno Villien		Greenwich Festival, Great Britain	
1997	'Nocturne for Lovers	Gavin Lambert	Kado Kostzer	Chichester Festival Theatre, Great Britain	
1997	The Story of Babar	Jean de Brunhoff	Francis Poulenc	Chichester Festival, Great Britain	
1998	Apprends-moi Céline	Maria Pacôme	Raymond Acquaviva	French tour	
1999	Readings from Colette		Roger Hodgeman	Melbourne Festival, Australia	
1999	Nocturne for Lovers		Roger Hodgeman	Melbourne Festival, Australia	
2006	I Remember It Well	Alan Jay Lerner	N/A	Herbst Theatre, San Francisco	
2009	Thank Heaven			Théâtre National of London	
2009	A Little Night Music	Stephen Sondheim	Lee Blakeley	Théâtre du Châtelet, Paris	
2014	Six Dance Lessons in Six Weeks	Richard Alfieri	Michael Arabian,	Laguna Playhouse, Laguna Beach, California	

== Awards and nominations ==
Year	Association	Category	Project	Result	Ref.
1953	Academy Award	Best Actress	Lili	Nominated	
1953	BAFTA Award	Best Foreign Actress	Lili	Won	
1958	Golden Globe Award	Best Actress – Motion Picture Comedy or Musical	Gigi	Nominated	
1958	Laurel Award	Top Female Musical Performance	Gigi	Won	
1961	Golden Globe Award	Best Actress in a Motion Picture – Drama	Fanny	Nominated	
1961	Laurel Award	Top Female Dramatic Performance	Fanny	5th Place	
1962	Academy Award	Best Actress	The L-Shaped Room	Nominated	
1962	BAFTA Award	Best British Actress	The L-Shaped Room	Won	
1962	Golden Globe Award	Best Actress in a Motion Picture – Drama	The L-Shaped Room	Won	
1962	Laurel Award	Top Female Dramatic Performance	The L-Shaped Room	3rd Place	
1962	New York Film Critics Circle	Best Actress	The L-Shaped Room	2nd Place	
2000	Screen Actors Guild Award	Outstanding Cast in a Motion Picture	Chocolat	Nominated	
2006	Primetime Emmy Award	Outstanding Guest Actress in a Drama Series	Law & Order: Special Victims Unit (for "Recall")	Won	

== Honorary awards ==
Organizations	Year	Award	Result	Ref.
President François Mitterrand	1993	Chevalier de la Légion d'honneur	Honored	
Catherine Trautmann, Minister of Culture	1998	Ordre National du Mérite	Honored	
Prime Minister Jean Pierre Raffarin	2004	Officier de la Légion d'Honneur	Honored	
Hollywood Walk of Fame	2009	Motion Picture Star	Honored	
Council of Paris	2012	Medaille D'Or De La Ville De Paris	Honored	
President of the French Republic	2013	Commandeur de la Légion d'honneur	Honored	
John F. Kennedy Center for the Performing Arts	2015	Gold Medal in the Arts	Honored	

== Recordings ==
- The Lover (l'Amant) by Marguerite Duras on cassettes
- First World War for the radio
- Le Martyre de Saint Sébastien by Claude Debussy and Gabriele d'Annunzio, with the London Symphony Orchestra, conducted by Michael Tilson Thomas
- Gigi by Colette in English on cassettes recorded in public at Merkin Concert Hall at Abraham Goodman House in New York City, 1996
- Narrated "Carnival of the Animals" music by Camille Saint-Saëns with the Nash Ensemble – Wigmore Hall, 1999
- The Plutocrats play for the BBC dir. Bill Bryden, written by Michael Hastings, from the novel by Booth Tarkington, January 1999
- The Rosebud Podcast One hour interview, as a guest of Gyles Brandreth on his podcast series. Published February 13th 2026

== Bibliography ==
- Caron, Leslie: Vengeance. Doubleday, 1982. ISBN 978-0-3851-7896-9
- Caron, Leslie: Thank Heaven: A Memoir. Viking Adult, 2009. ISBN 978-0-6700-2134-5

== See also ==
- List of dancers
