= Paron, Yonne =

Paron
- Commune
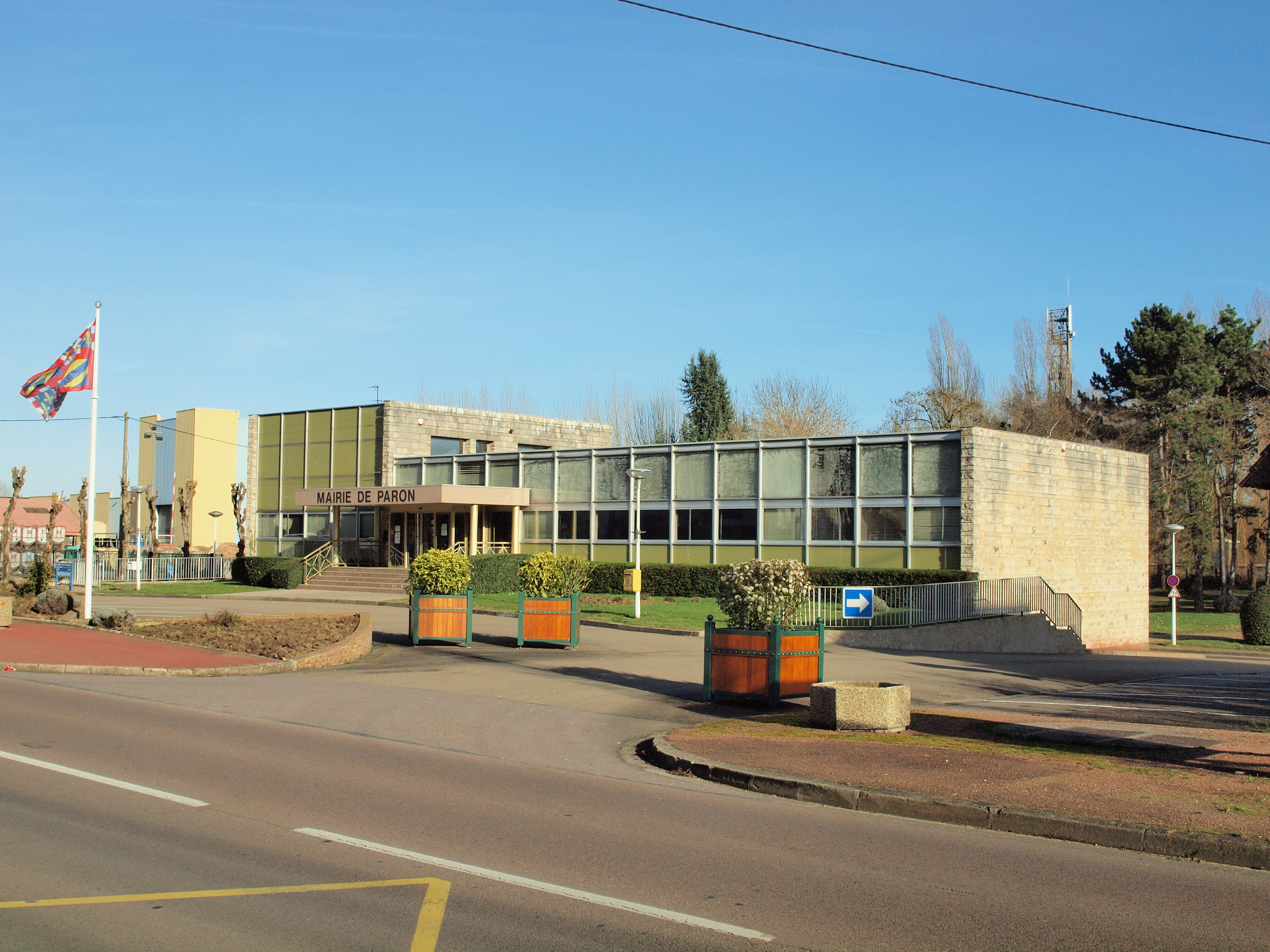
- The town hall in Paron

- Coat of arms
- Location of Paron
- Location within France Location within Bourgogne-Franche-Comté
- Coordinates: 48°11′36″N 3°15′36″E
- Country: France
- Region: Bourgogne-Franche-Comté
- Department: Yonne
- Arrondissement: Sens
- Canton: Sens-2
- Intercommunality: CA Grand Sénonais

Government
  - Mayor (2020–2026): Jean-Luc Givord
- Area^{1}: 10.51 km^{2} (4.06 sq mi)
- Highest elevation: 179 m (587 ft)
- Lowest elevation: 62 m (203 ft)
- Population (2023): 4,834
  - Density: 459.9/km^{2} (1,191/sq mi)
- Time zone: UTC+01:00 (CET)
  - Summer (DST): UTC+02:00 (CEST)
- INSEE/Postal code: 89287 /89100
- ^{1} French Land Register data, which excludes lakes, ponds, glaciers > 1 km^{2} (0.386 sq mi or 247 acres) and river estuaries.

Paron (French pronunciation: [paʁɔ̃]) is a commune in the Yonne department in Bourgogne-Franche-Comté in north-central France.

== Population ==
Historical population
Year	Pop.	±% p.a.
1968	1,783	—
1975	2,747	+6.37%
1982	3,889	+5.09%
1990	4,537	+1.95%
1999	4,845	+0.73%
2007	4,489	−0.95%
2012	4,581	+0.41%
2017	4,853	+1.16%
2023	4,834	−0.07%
Source: INSEE

== See also ==
- Communes of the Yonne department
