= Canton of Sens-1 =

Coordinates: 48.20°N 3.28°E

The canton of Sens-1 is an administrative division of the Yonne department, central France. It was created at the French canton reorganisation which came into effect in March 2015. Its seat is in Sens.

It consists of the following communes:

1. Saint-Clément
2. Saint-Martin-du-Tertre
3. Sens
