= Étigny =

- Commune
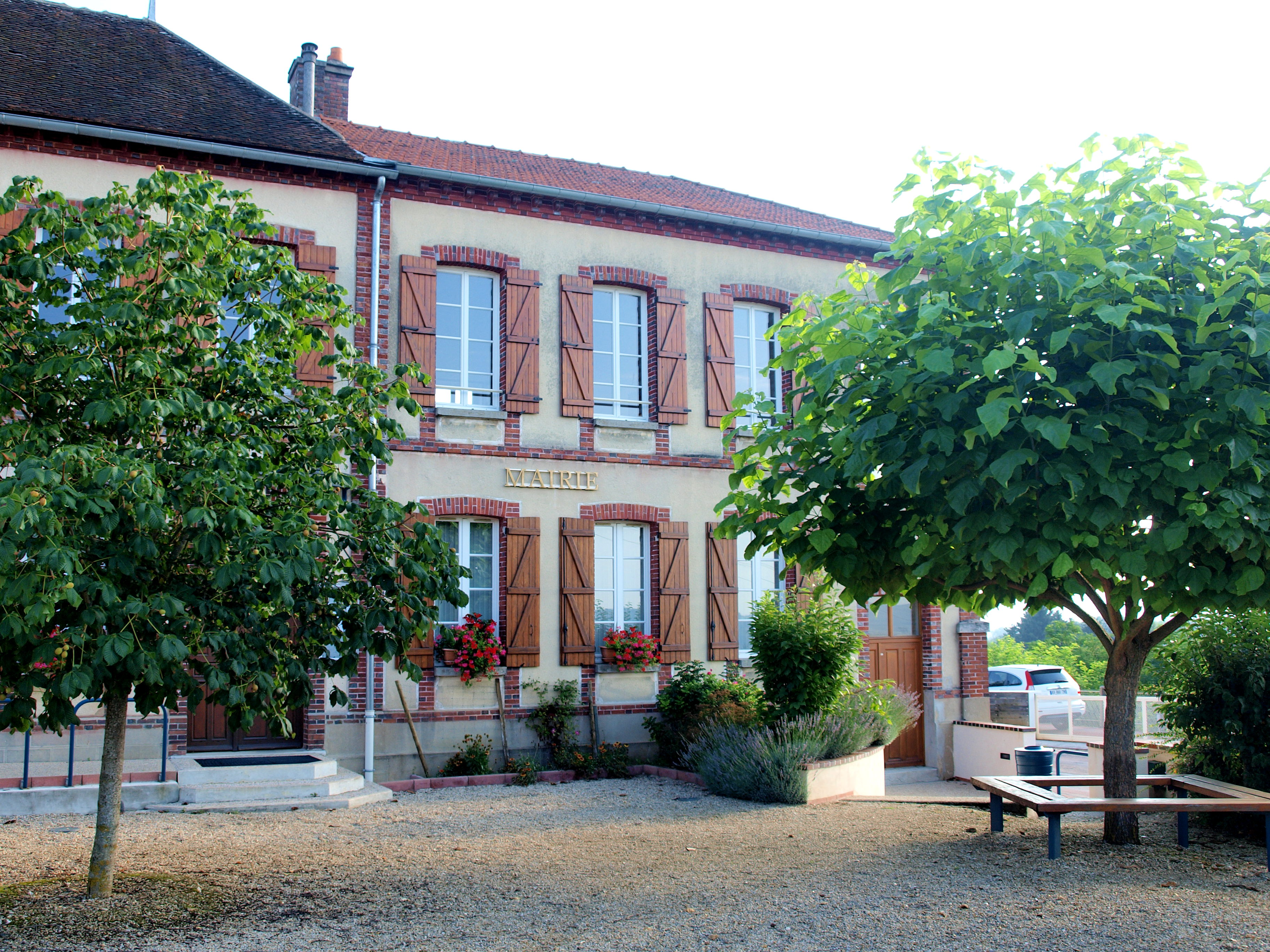
- The town hall in Étigny

- Coat of arms
- Location of Étigny
- Location within France Location within Bourgogne-Franche-Comté
- Coordinates: 48°08′20″N 3°17′32″E
- Country: France
- Region: Bourgogne-Franche-Comté
- Department: Yonne
- Arrondissement: Sens
- Canton: Villeneuve-sur-Yonne
- Intercommunality: CA Grand Sénonais

Government
  - Mayor (2020–2026): Lionel Terrasson
- Area^{1}: 6.86 km^{2} (2.65 sq mi)
- Highest elevation: 174 m (571 ft)
- Lowest elevation: 66 m (217 ft)
- Population (2023): 747
  - Density: 109/km^{2} (282/sq mi)
- Time zone: UTC+01:00 (CET)
  - Summer (DST): UTC+02:00 (CEST)
- INSEE/Postal code: 89160 /89510
- ^{1} French Land Register data, which excludes lakes, ponds, glaciers > 1 km^{2} (0.386 sq mi or 247 acres) and river estuaries.

Étigny (French pronunciation: [etiɲi]) is a commune in the Yonne department in Bourgogne-Franche-Comté in north-central France.

== See also ==
- Communes of the Yonne department
