= Church of Notre-Dame, Villeneuve-sur-Yonne =

Church in Villeneuve-sur-Yonne, France

Coordinates: 48.0820°N 3.2948°E

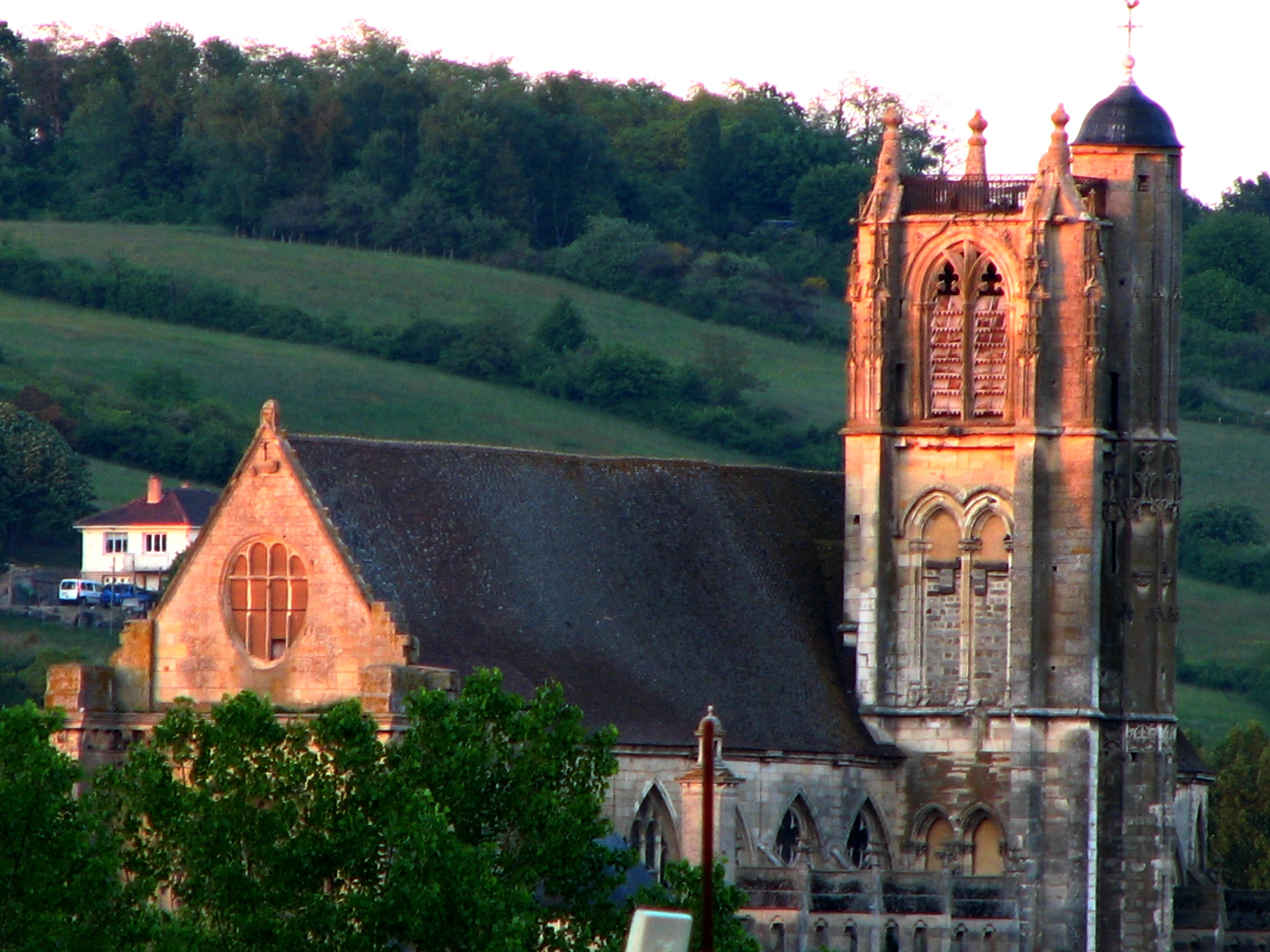
Outdoors.

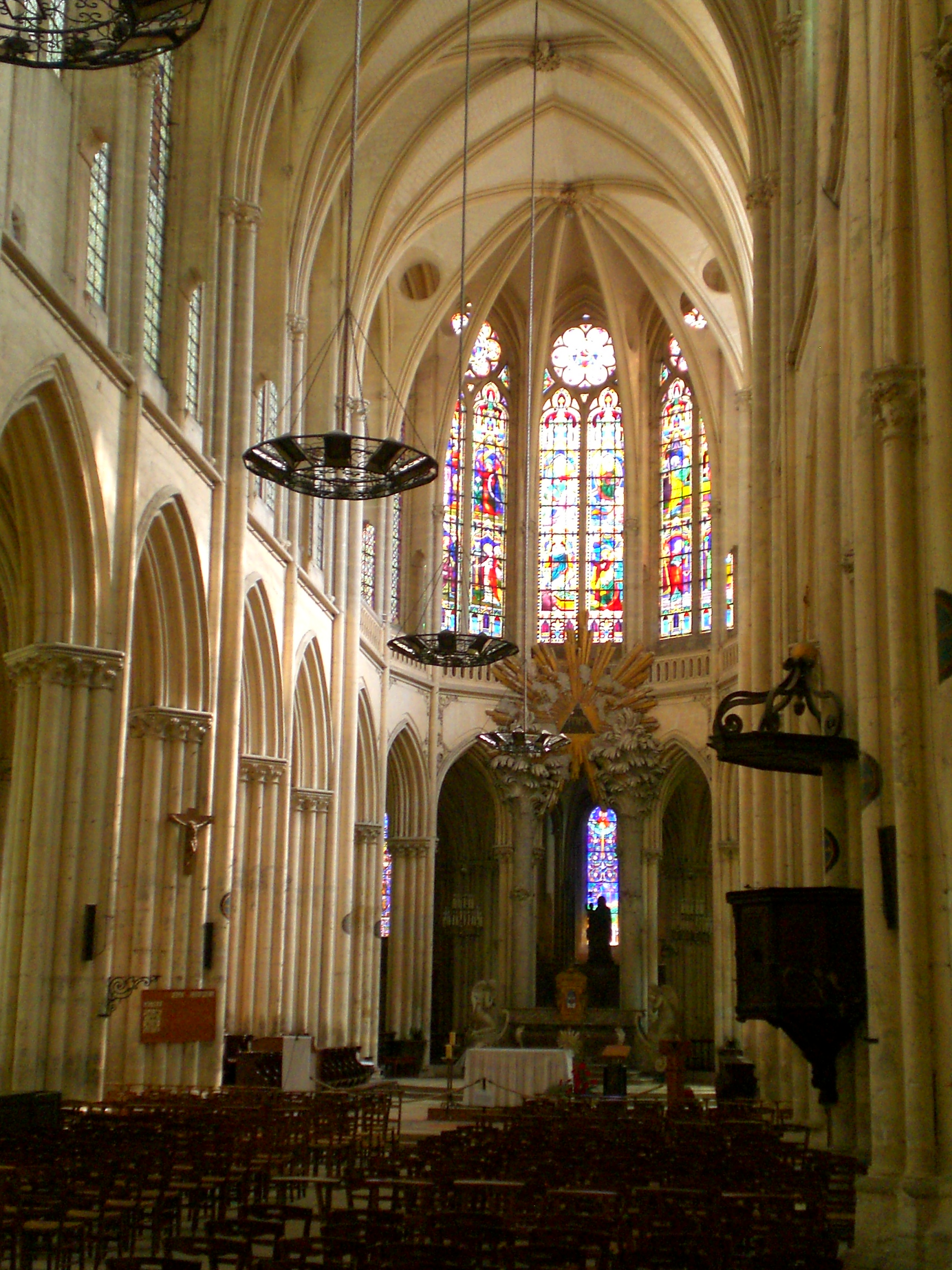
Indoors.

The Church of Notre-Dame (Église Notre-Dame-de-l'Assomption) is a Roman Catholic church located in Villeneuve-sur-Yonne in France (North of Burgundy). It is dedicated to Our Lady of the Assumption and is a church of the Archdiocese of Sens-Auxerre.

== History ==
Its first stone was blessed by Pope Alexander III in 1163 at the same time of Notre-Dame de Paris. The great Renaissance porch was built in 1575 from sketchings of Jean Chéreau, born in Joigny.

The Church was registered in 1862 into Monuments historiques. It is a remarkable example of a Gothic church from the School of Champagne, or Île de France. Some of the stained glass windows are from the 13th century (north side) and others from the 16th century (The Life of the Virgin, south side, 1st chapel). You can notice one of the first examples in a stained glass of a figure with spectacles. This window depicting the Last Judgement is due to Jean Cousin the Younger. The statue of the Virgin with a Bird (14th century) is from a royal manufacturer (right side). A Madonna with the Child is a polychromatic statue from the 16th century (left side). Other interesting elements are paintings such as The Adoration of the Shepherds (around 1780) from François-Guillaume Ménageot, an Immaculate Conception and a portrait of saint Louis worshipping the Crown of thorns.

The organ (18th century) was restored in 1992. Concerts are organized during summer.

== Gallery ==
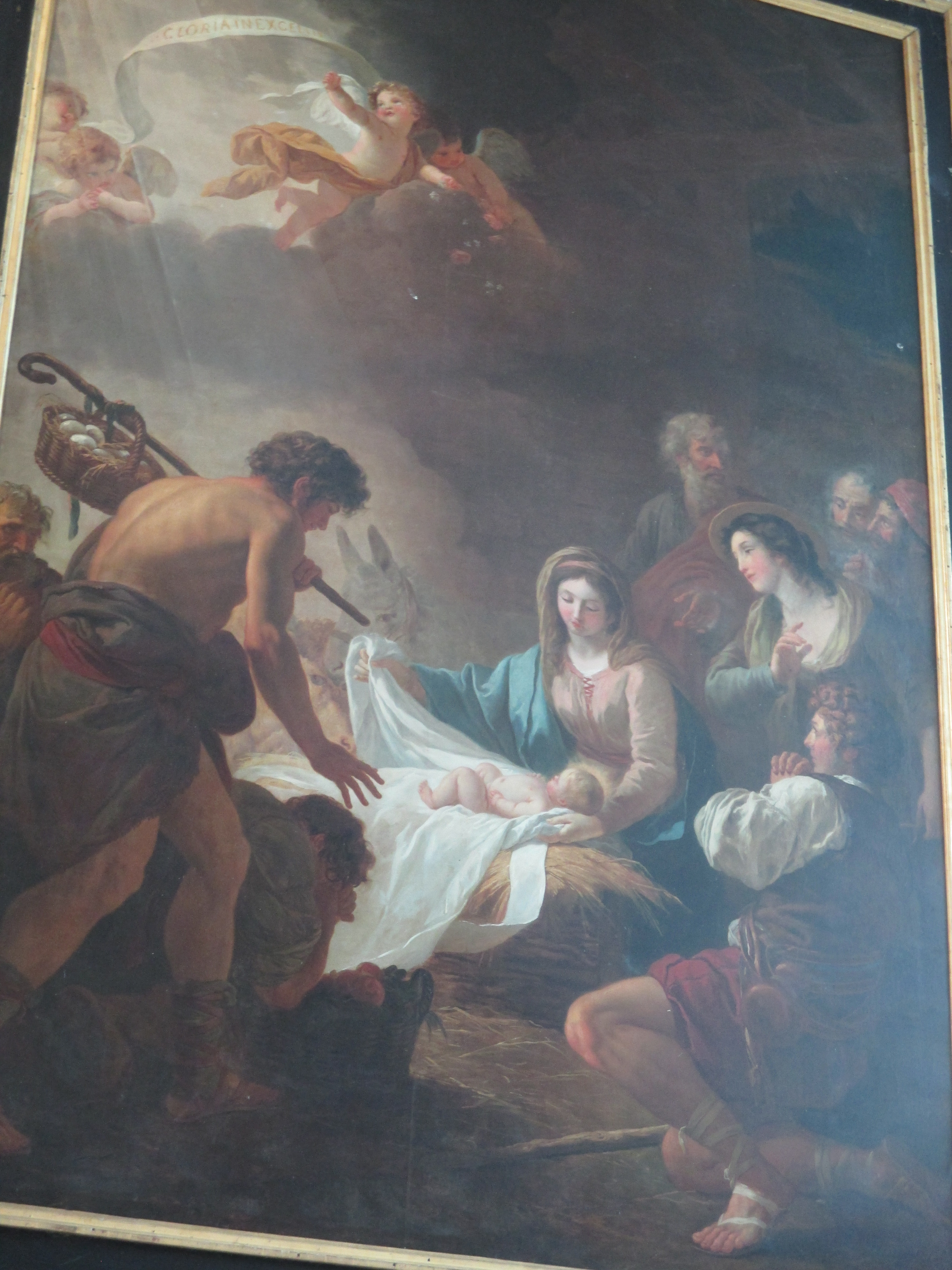
The Adoration of the Shepherds (from Ménageot)

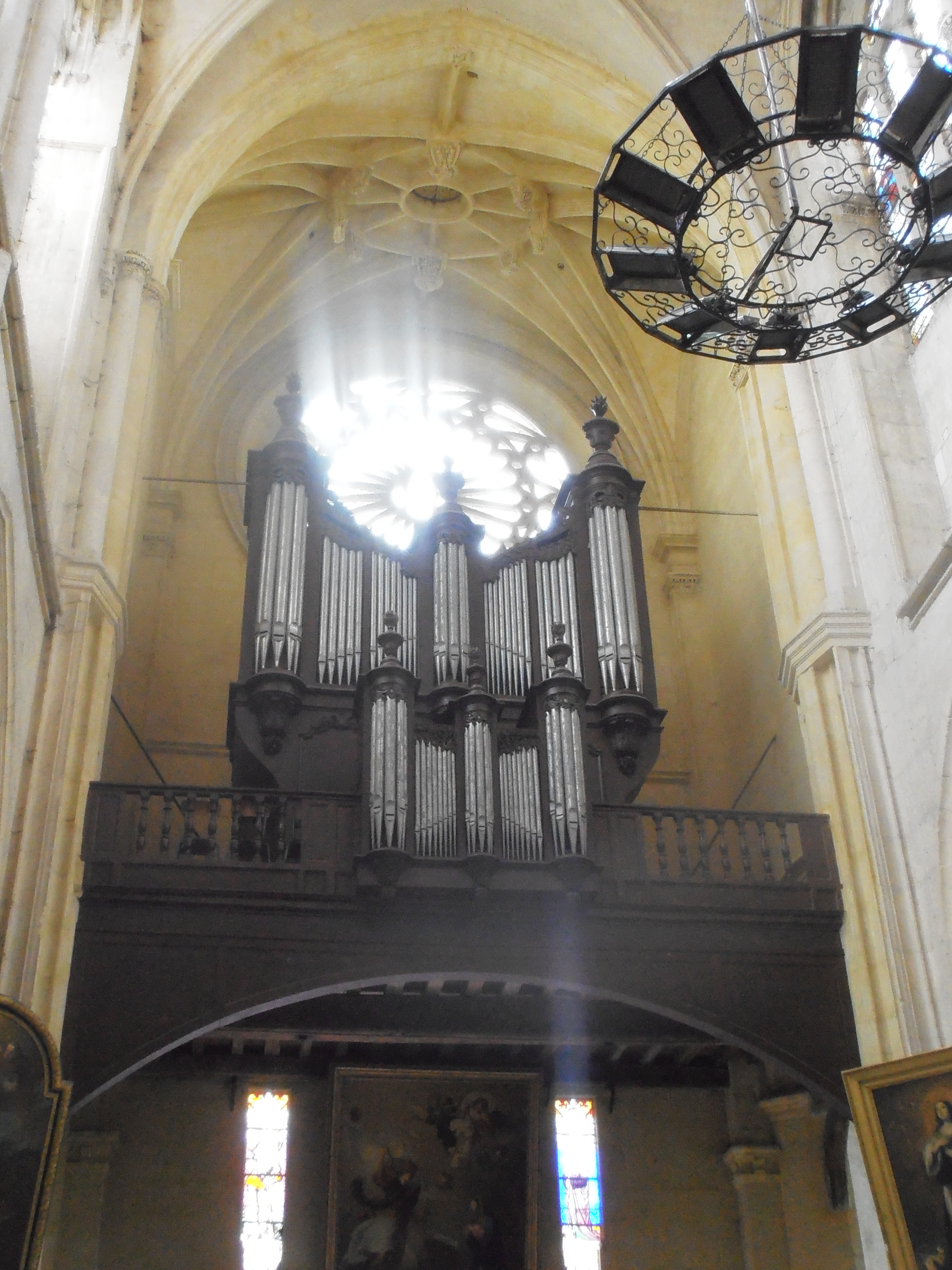
Organ (18th century)

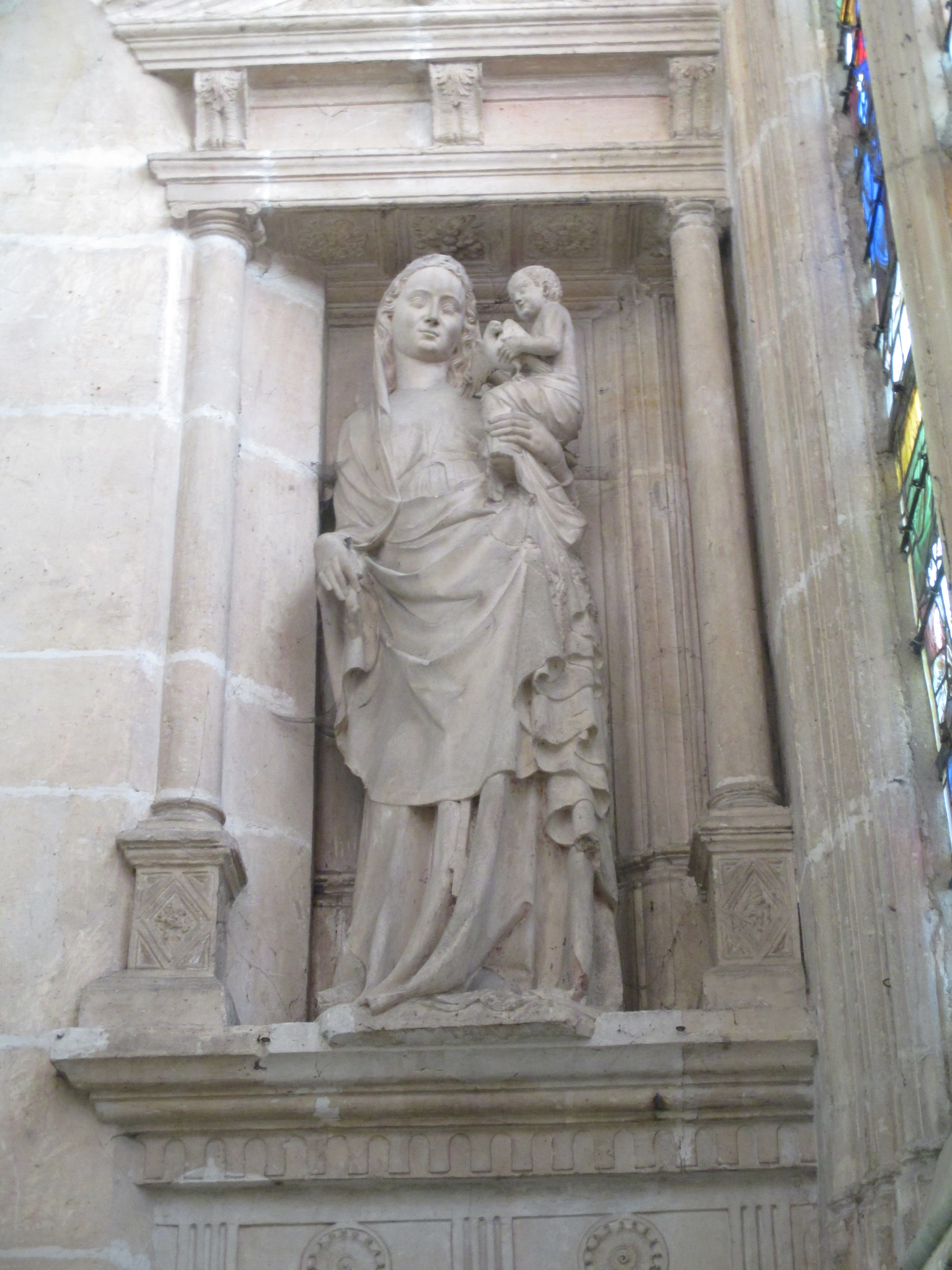
The Virgin with the Bird (14th century)

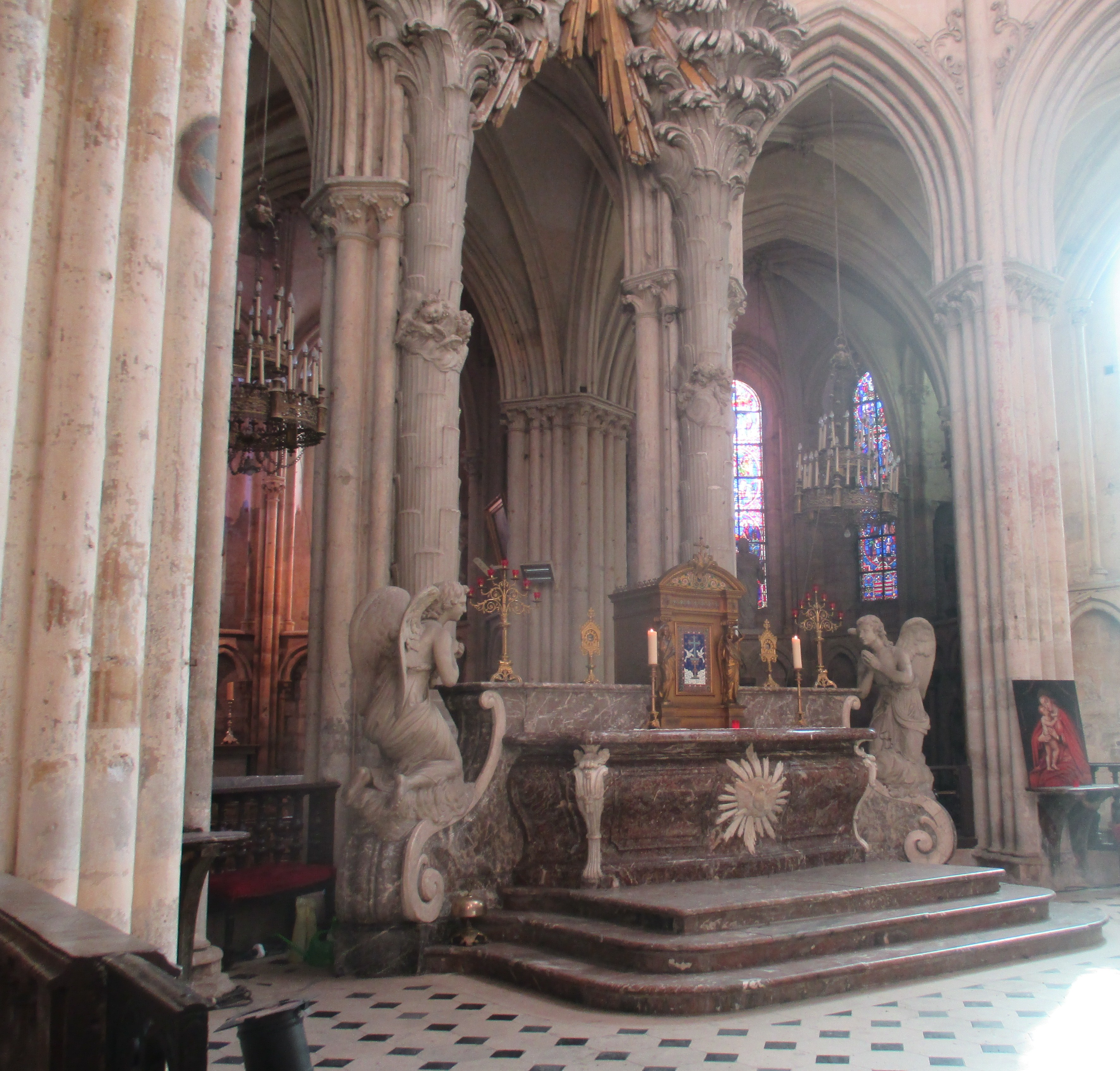
Main altar (18th century)
