= Canton of Villeneuve-sur-Yonne =

Coordinates: 48°04′24″N 3°15′55″E

Villeneuve-sur-Yonne
- Canton
- Interactive map of Villeneuve-sur-Yonne
- Country: France
- Region: Bourgogne-Franche-Comté
- Department: Yonne
- No. of communes: {{{nbcomm}}}
- Area: 223.18 km^{2} (86.17 sq mi)
- Population (2023): 13,245
  - Density: 59.347/km^{2} (153.71/sq mi)
- INSEE code: 8920

The canton of Villeneuve-sur-Yonne is a canton of France, located in the Yonne département, in the Bourgogne-Franche-Comté région. It has 12 communes.

== Communes ==
Since the French canton reorganisation which came into effect in March 2015, the communes of the canton of Villeneuve-sur-Yonne are:

1. Armeau
2. Les Bordes
3. Bussy-le-Repos
4. Chaumot
5. Dixmont
6. Étigny
7. Marsangy
8. Passy
9. Piffonds
10. Rousson
11. Véron
12. Villeneuve-sur-Yonne

== See also ==
- Cantons of the Yonne department
