= Saint-Martin-du-Tertre, Yonne =

Saint-Martin-du-Tertre
- Commune
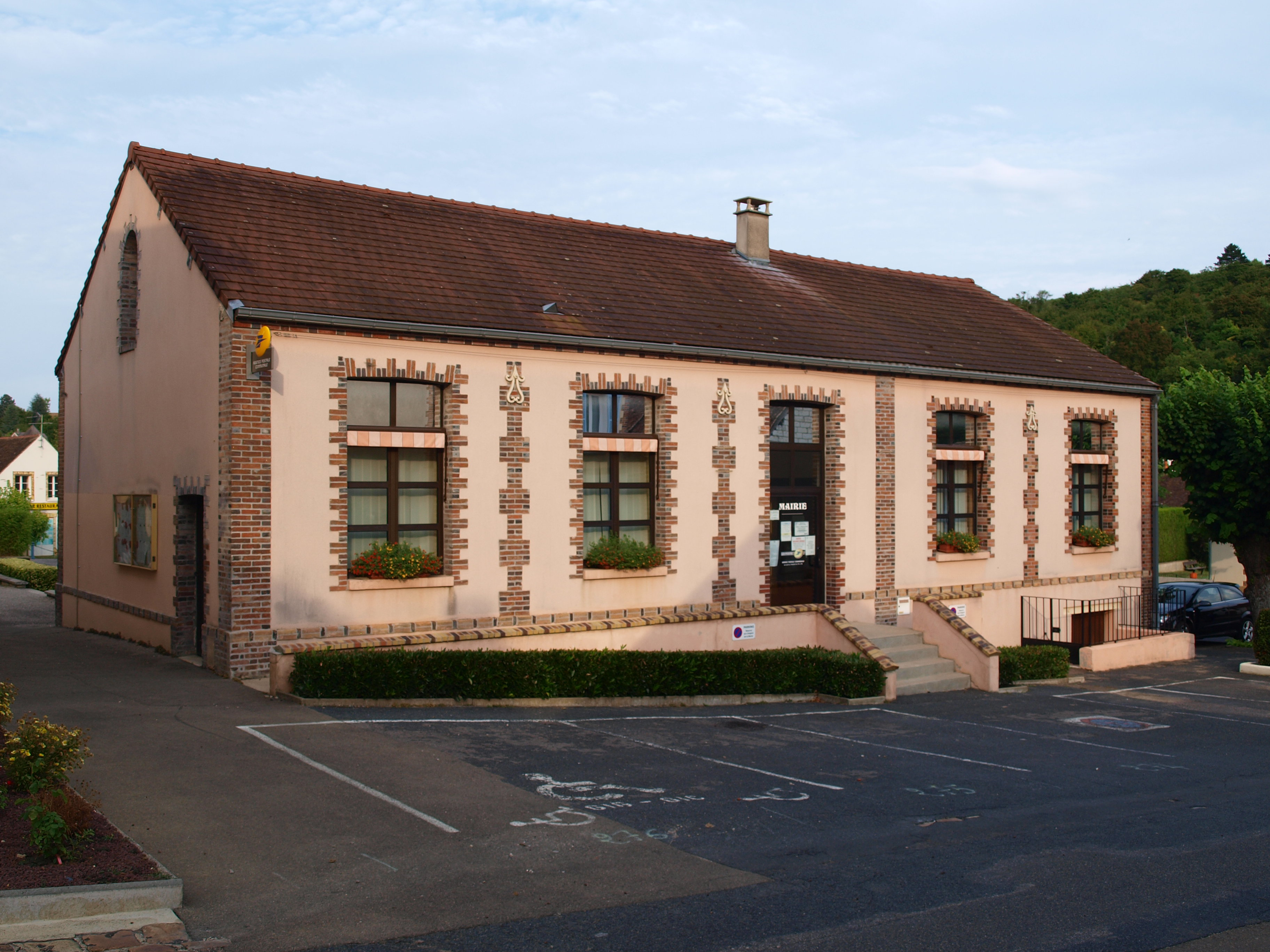
- The town hall in Saint-Martin-du-Tertre

- Coat of arms
- Location of Saint-Martin-du-Tertre
- Location within France Location within Bourgogne-Franche-Comté
- Coordinates: 48°12′52″N 3°15′36″E
- Country: France
- Region: Bourgogne-Franche-Comté
- Department: Yonne
- Arrondissement: Sens
- Canton: Sens-1
- Intercommunality: CA Grand Sénonais

Government
  - Mayor (2020–2026): Daniel Cordillot
- Area^{1}: 6.91 km^{2} (2.67 sq mi)
- Highest elevation: 183 m (600 ft)
- Lowest elevation: 62 m (203 ft)
- Population (2023): 1,536
  - Density: 222/km^{2} (576/sq mi)
- Time zone: UTC+01:00 (CET)
  - Summer (DST): UTC+02:00 (CEST)
- INSEE/Postal code: 89354 /89100
- ^{1} French Land Register data, which excludes lakes, ponds, glaciers > 1 km^{2} (0.386 sq mi or 247 acres) and river estuaries.

Saint-Martin-du-Tertre (French pronunciation: [sɛ̃ maʁtɛ̃ dy tɛʁtʁ]) is a commune in the Yonne department in Bourgogne-Franche-Comté in north-central France. It is situated on the left bank of the river Yonne, 2 km northwest of Sens.

== See also ==
- Communes of the Yonne department
