= Marsangy =

- Commune
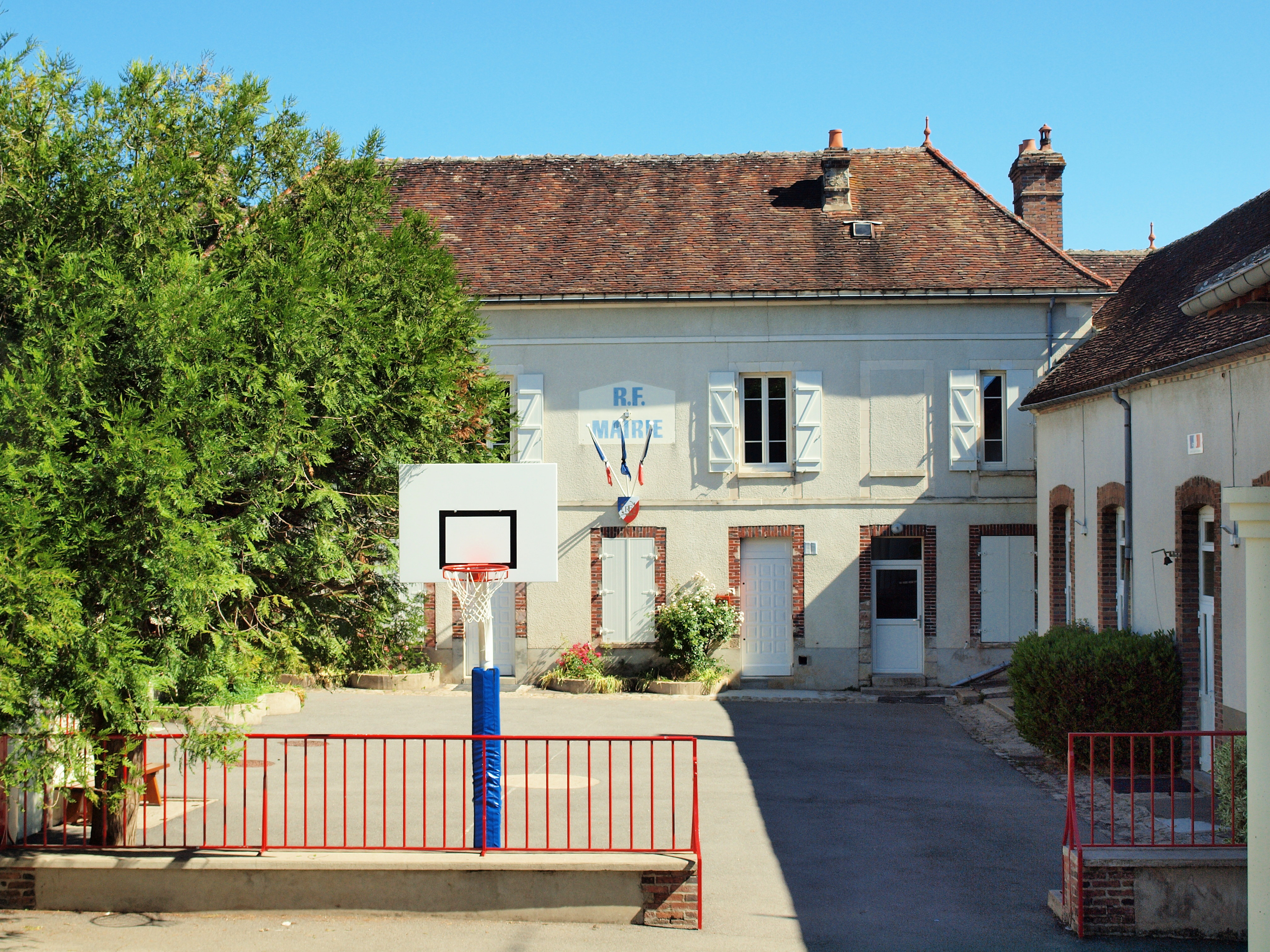
- The town hall in Marsangy

- Coat of arms
- Location of Marsangy
- Location within France Location within Bourgogne-Franche-Comté
- Coordinates: 48°06′40″N 3°15′30″E
- Country: France
- Region: Bourgogne-Franche-Comté
- Department: Yonne
- Arrondissement: Sens
- Canton: Villeneuve-sur-Yonne
- Intercommunality: CA Grand Sénonais

Government
  - Mayor (2020–2026): Philippe Fontenel
- Area^{1}: 14.68 km^{2} (5.67 sq mi)
- Highest elevation: 186 m (610 ft)
- Lowest elevation: 68 m (223 ft)
- Population (2023): 870
  - Density: 59/km^{2} (150/sq mi)
- Time zone: UTC+01:00 (CET)
  - Summer (DST): UTC+02:00 (CEST)
- INSEE/Postal code: 89245 /89500
- ^{1} French Land Register data, which excludes lakes, ponds, glaciers > 1 km^{2} (0.386 sq mi or 247 acres) and river estuaries.

Marsangy (French pronunciation: [maʁsɑ̃ʒi]) is a commune in the Yonne department in Bourgogne-Franche-Comté in north-central France.

== See also ==
- Communes of the Yonne department
