= Piffonds =

- Commune
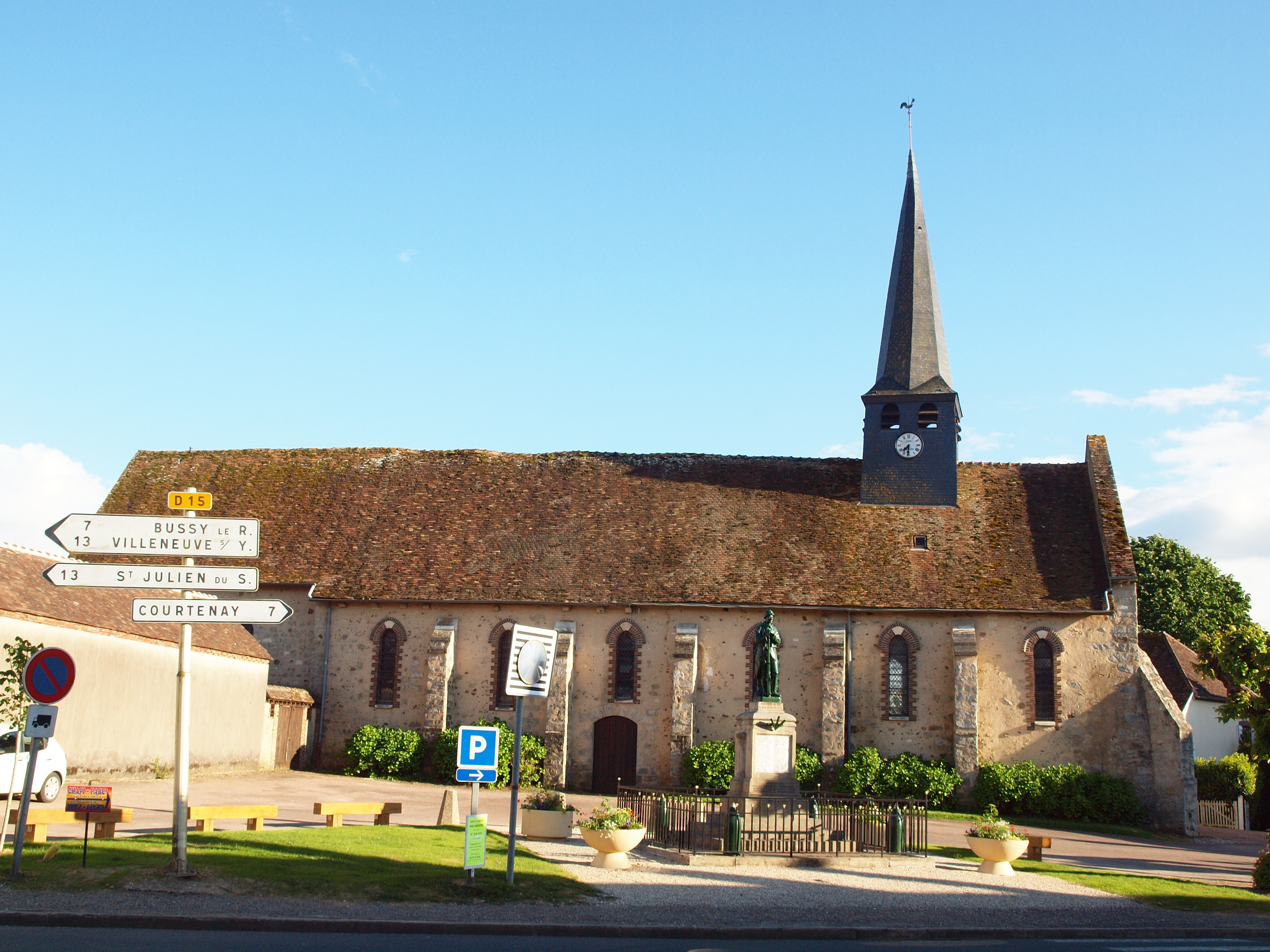
- The church in Piffonds

- Coat of arms
- Location of Piffonds
- Location within France Location within Bourgogne-Franche-Comté
- Coordinates: 48°03′23″N 3°08′50″E
- Country: France
- Region: Bourgogne-Franche-Comté
- Department: Yonne
- Arrondissement: Sens
- Canton: Villeneuve-sur-Yonne

Government
  - Mayor (2021–2026): Xavier Rosalie
- Area^{1}: 24.55 km^{2} (9.48 sq mi)
- Highest elevation: 196 m (643 ft)
- Lowest elevation: 133 m (436 ft)
- Population (2023): 582
  - Density: 23.7/km^{2} (61.4/sq mi)
- Time zone: UTC+01:00 (CET)
  - Summer (DST): UTC+02:00 (CEST)
- INSEE/Postal code: 89298 /89330
- ^{1} French Land Register data, which excludes lakes, ponds, glaciers > 1 km^{2} (0.386 sq mi or 247 acres) and river estuaries.

Piffonds (French pronunciation: [pifɔ̃]) is a commune in the Yonne department in Bourgogne-Franche-Comté in north-central France.

== See also ==
- Communes of the Yonne department
