= Saint-Clément, Yonne =

Saint-Clément
- Commune
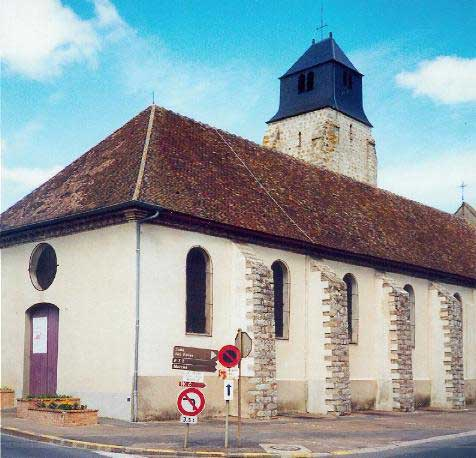
- The church in Saint-Clément

- Coat of arms
- Location of Saint-Clément
- Location within France Location within Bourgogne-Franche-Comté
- Coordinates: 48°13′07″N 3°17′37″E
- Country: France
- Region: Bourgogne-Franche-Comté
- Department: Yonne
- Arrondissement: Sens
- Canton: Sens-1
- Intercommunality: CA Grand Sénonais

Government
  - Mayor (2020–2026): Gilles Pirman
- Area^{1}: 8.47 km^{2} (3.27 sq mi)
- Highest elevation: 211 m (692 ft)
- Lowest elevation: 63 m (207 ft)
- Population (2023): 2,849
  - Density: 336/km^{2} (871/sq mi)
- Time zone: UTC+01:00 (CET)
  - Summer (DST): UTC+02:00 (CEST)
- INSEE/Postal code: 89338 /89100
- ^{1} French Land Register data, which excludes lakes, ponds, glaciers > 1 km^{2} (0.386 sq mi or 247 acres) and river estuaries.

Saint-Clément (French pronunciation: [sɛ̃ klemɑ̃]) is a commune in the Yonne department in Bourgogne-Franche-Comté in north-central France.

== Population ==
Historical population
Year	Pop.	±% p.a.
1968	2,136	—
1975	2,709	+3.45%
1982	2,869	+0.82%
1990	2,776	−0.41%
1999	2,887	+0.44%
2007	2,868	−0.08%
2012	2,801	−0.47%
2017	2,756	−0.32%
2023	2,849	+0.55%
Source: INSEE

== See also ==
- Communes of the Yonne department
