= Les Bordes, Yonne =

Les Bordes
- Commune
- Location of Les Bordes
- Location within France Location within Bourgogne-Franche-Comté
- Coordinates: 48°05′54″N 3°22′53″E
- Country: France
- Region: Bourgogne-Franche-Comté
- Department: Yonne
- Arrondissement: Sens
- Canton: Villeneuve-sur-Yonne
- Intercommunality: CA Grand Sénonais

Government
  - Mayor (2020–2026): Sylvie Adam
- Area^{1}: 18.68 km^{2} (7.21 sq mi)
- Highest elevation: 234 m (768 ft)
- Lowest elevation: 103 m (338 ft)
- Population (2023): 551
  - Density: 29.5/km^{2} (76.4/sq mi)
- Time zone: UTC+01:00 (CET)
  - Summer (DST): UTC+02:00 (CEST)
- INSEE/Postal code: 89051 /89500
- ^{1} French Land Register data, which excludes lakes, ponds, glaciers > 1 km^{2} (0.386 sq mi or 247 acres) and river estuaries.

Les Bordes (French pronunciation: [le bɔʁd]) is a commune in the Yonne department in Bourgogne-Franche-Comté in north-central France.

== See also ==
- Communes of the Yonne department
