= Maillot, Yonne =

Maillot
- Commune
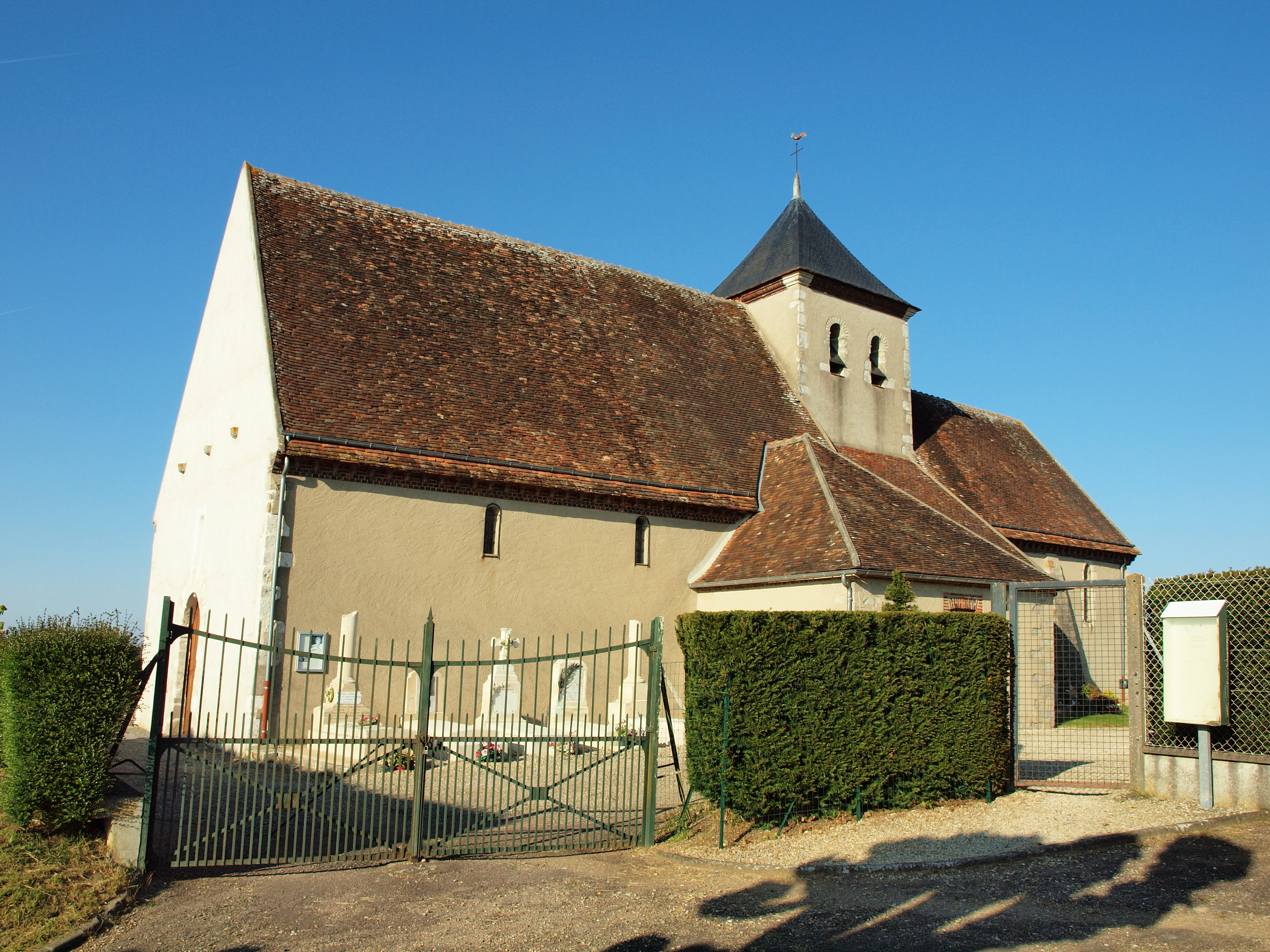
- The church in Maillot
- Location of Maillot
- Location within France Location within Bourgogne-Franche-Comté
- Coordinates: 48°10′30″N 3°18′31″E
- Country: France
- Region: Bourgogne-Franche-Comté
- Department: Yonne
- Arrondissement: Sens
- Canton: Sens-2
- Intercommunality: CA Grand Sénonais

Government
  - Mayor (2020–2026): Gilles Sabattier
- Area^{1}: 6.17 km^{2} (2.38 sq mi)
- Highest elevation: 183 m (600 ft)
- Lowest elevation: 69 m (226 ft)
- Population (2023): 1,268
  - Density: 206/km^{2} (532/sq mi)
- Time zone: UTC+01:00 (CET)
  - Summer (DST): UTC+02:00 (CEST)
- INSEE/Postal code: 89236 /89100
- ^{1} French Land Register data, which excludes lakes, ponds, glaciers > 1 km^{2} (0.386 sq mi or 247 acres) and river estuaries.

Maillot (French pronunciation: [majo]) is a commune in the Yonne department in Bourgogne-Franche-Comté in north-central France.

== See also ==
- Communes of the Yonne department
