= Communauté d'agglomération du Grand Sénonais =

Grand Sénonais
- Communauté d'agglomération
- Interactive map of Grand Sénonais
- Coordinates: 48°09′N 03°20′E
- Country: France
- Region: Bourgogne-Franche-Comté
- Department: Yonne
- No. of communes: {{{nbcomm}}}
- Established: 2002
- Area: 375.2 km^{2} (144.9 sq mi)
- Population (2019): 59,202
  - Density: 157.8/km^{2} (408.7/sq mi)
- Website: www.grand-senonais.fr

Communauté d'agglomération du Grand Sénonais is the communauté d'agglomération, an intercommunal structure, centred on the town of Sens. It is located in the Yonne department, in the Bourgogne-Franche-Comté region, central France. Created in 2002, its seat is in Sens. Its area is 375.2 km^{2}. Its population was 59,202 in 2019, of which 26,688 in Sens proper.

== Composition ==
The communauté d'agglomération consists of the following 27 communes:

1. Armeau
2. Les Bordes
3. Collemiers
4. Courtois-sur-Yonne
5. Dixmont
6. Étigny
7. Fontaine-la-Gaillarde
8. Gron
9. Maillot
10. Malay-le-Grand
11. Malay-le-Petit
12. Marsangy
13. Noé
14. Paron
15. Passy
16. Rosoy
17. Rousson
18. Saint-Clément
19. Saint-Denis-lès-Sens
20. Saint-Martin-du-Tertre
21. Saligny
22. Sens
23. Soucy
24. Véron
25. Villeneuve-sur-Yonne
26. Villiers-Louis
27. Voisines
