= Armeau =

- Commune
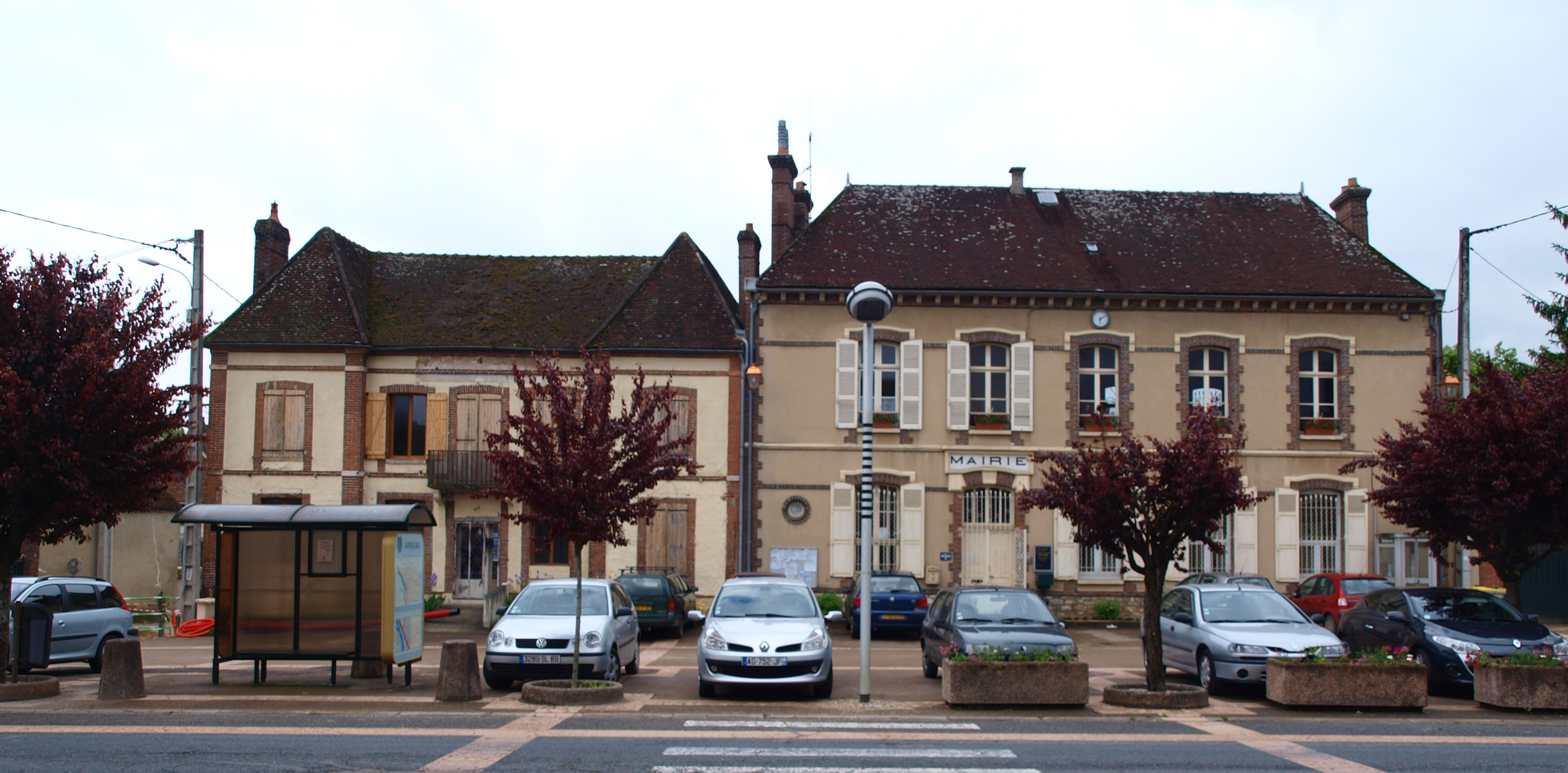
- The town hall in Armeau

- Coat of arms
- Location of Armeau
- Location within France Location within Bourgogne-Franche-Comté
- Coordinates: 48°02′47″N 3°19′27″E
- Country: France
- Region: Bourgogne-Franche-Comté
- Department: Yonne
- Arrondissement: Sens
- Canton: Villeneuve-sur-Yonne
- Intercommunality: CA Grand Sénonais

Government
  - Mayor (2020–2026): Catherine Toullier
- Area^{1}: 10.31 km^{2} (3.98 sq mi)
- Highest elevation: 211 m (692 ft)
- Lowest elevation: 71 m (233 ft)
- Population (2023): 753
  - Density: 73.0/km^{2} (189/sq mi)
- Time zone: UTC+01:00 (CET)
  - Summer (DST): UTC+02:00 (CEST)
- INSEE/Postal code: 89018 /89500
- ^{1} French Land Register data, which excludes lakes, ponds, glaciers > 1 km^{2} (0.386 sq mi or 247 acres) and river estuaries.

Armeau (French pronunciation: [aʁmo]) is a commune in the Yonne department in Bourgogne-Franche-Comté in north-central France.

== See also ==
- Communes of the Yonne department
