= Rosoy, Yonne =

Rosoy
- Commune
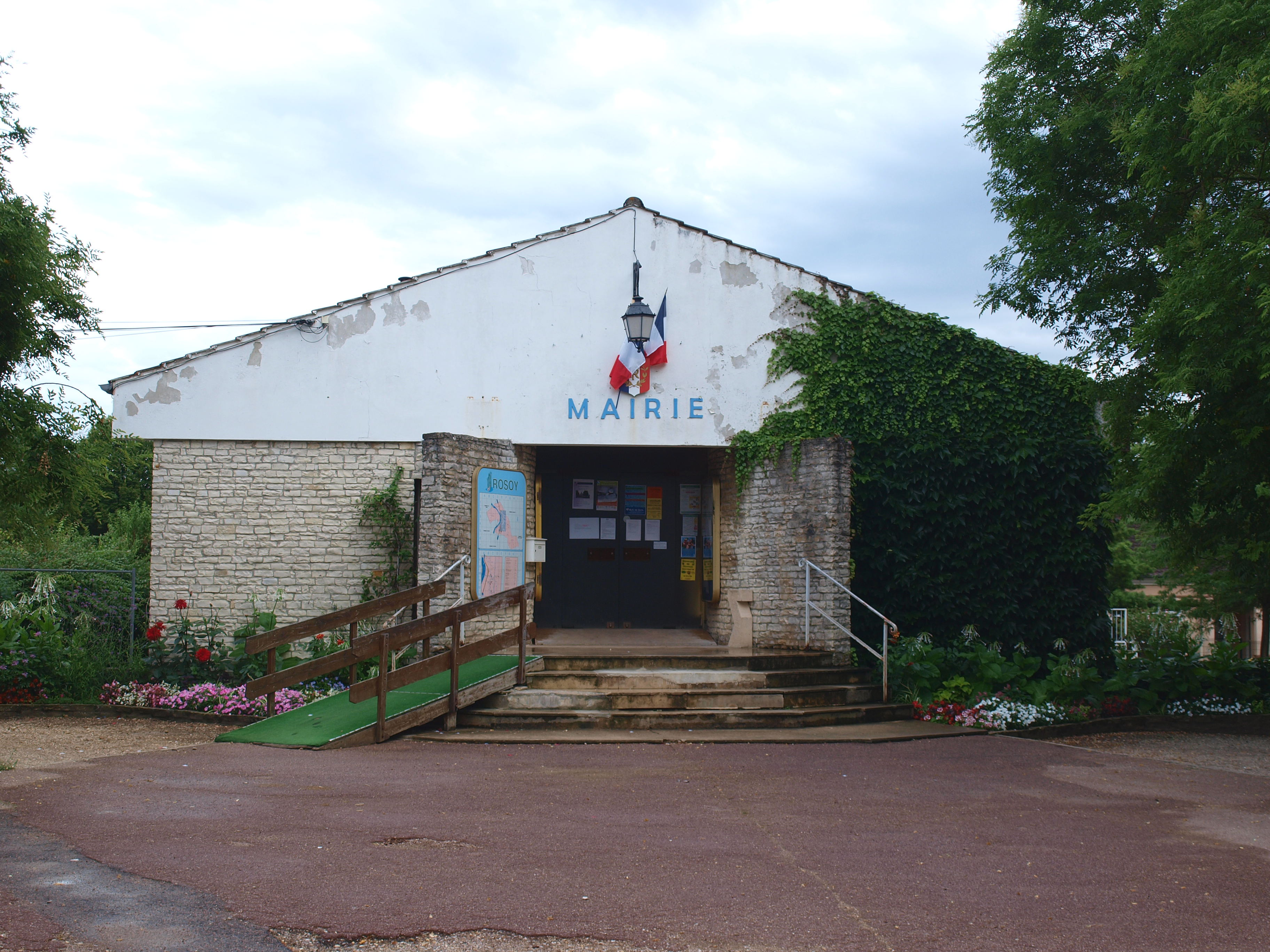
- The town hall in Rosoy
- Location of Rosoy
- Location within France Location within Bourgogne-Franche-Comté
- Coordinates: 48°09′08″N 3°18′34″E
- Country: France
- Region: Bourgogne-Franche-Comté
- Department: Yonne
- Arrondissement: Sens
- Canton: Sens-2
- Intercommunality: CA Grand Sénonais

Government
  - Mayor (2020–2026): Dominique Chappuit
- Area^{1}: 5.98 km^{2} (2.31 sq mi)
- Population (2023): 1,072
  - Density: 179/km^{2} (464/sq mi)
- Time zone: UTC+01:00 (CET)
  - Summer (DST): UTC+02:00 (CEST)
- INSEE/Postal code: 89326 /89100
- Website: www.rosoy-89.fr
- ^{1} French Land Register data, which excludes lakes, ponds, glaciers > 1 km^{2} (0.386 sq mi or 247 acres) and river estuaries.

Rosoy (French pronunciation: [ʁozwa]) is a commune in the Yonne département, in the French region of Bourgogne-Franche-Comté.

Merged with Sens since 1973, the commune was recreated on 12 February 2008.

== See also ==
- Communes of the Yonne department
