= Gron, Yonne =

Gron
- Commune
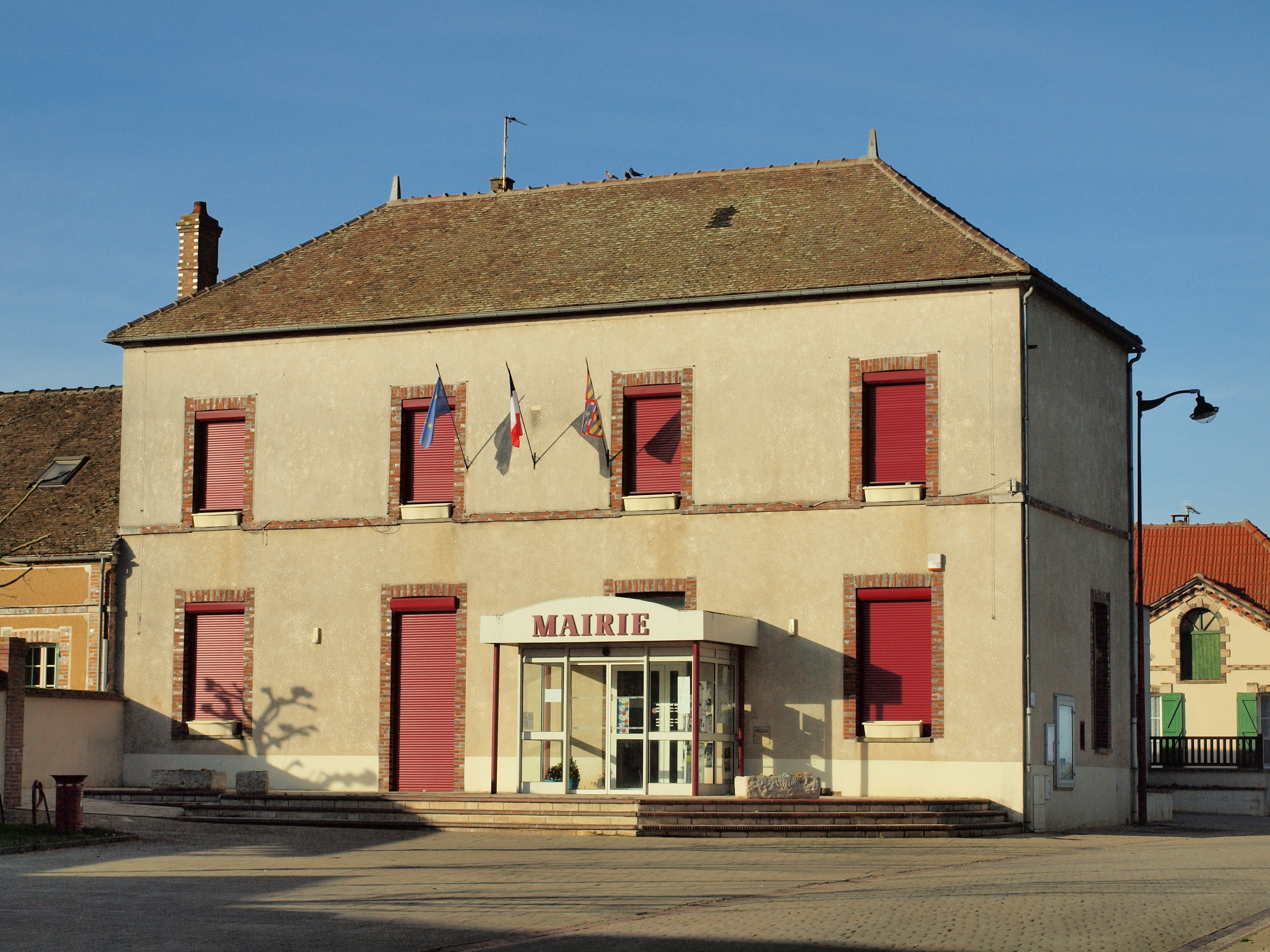
- The town hall in Gron

- Coat of arms
- Location of Gron
- Location within France Location within Bourgogne-Franche-Comté
- Coordinates: 48°09′30″N 3°15′51″E
- Country: France
- Region: Bourgogne-Franche-Comté
- Department: Yonne
- Arrondissement: Sens
- Canton: Sens-2
- Intercommunality: CA Grand Sénonais

Government
  - Mayor (2020–2026): Stéphane Perennes
- Area^{1}: 11.73 km^{2} (4.53 sq mi)
- Highest elevation: 181 m (594 ft)
- Lowest elevation: 66 m (217 ft)
- Population (2023): 1,288
  - Density: 109.8/km^{2} (284.4/sq mi)
- Time zone: UTC+01:00 (CET)
  - Summer (DST): UTC+02:00 (CEST)
- INSEE/Postal code: 89195 /89100
- ^{1} French Land Register data, which excludes lakes, ponds, glaciers > 1 km^{2} (0.386 sq mi or 247 acres) and river estuaries.

Gron (French pronunciation: [ɡʁɔ̃]) is a commune in the Yonne department in Bourgogne-Franche-Comté in north-central France.

== See also ==
- Communes of the Yonne department
