= Villeneuve-sur-Yonne =

- Commune
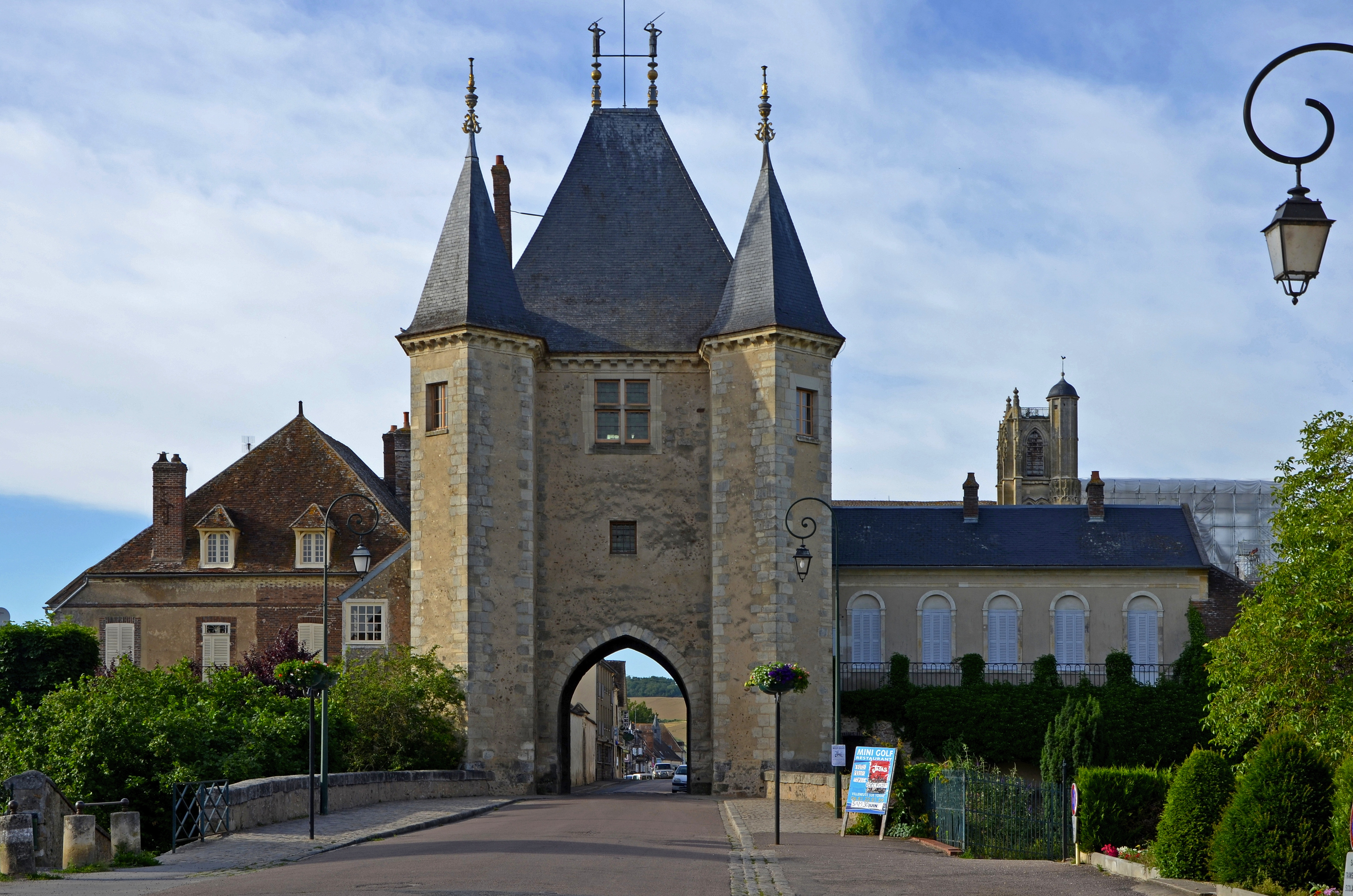
- Gate in Villeneuve sur Yonne, Yonne, Burgundy, France

- Coat of arms
- Location of Villeneuve-sur-Yonne
- Location within France Location within Bourgogne-Franche-Comté
- Coordinates: 48°05′34″N 3°17′40″E
- Country: France
- Region: Bourgogne-Franche-Comté
- Department: Yonne
- Arrondissement: Sens
- Canton: Villeneuve-sur-Yonne
- Intercommunality: CA Grand Sénonais

Government
  - Mayor (2020–2026): Nadège Naze
- Area^{1}: 40.00 km^{2} (15.44 sq mi)
- Highest elevation: 206 m (676 ft)
- Lowest elevation: 68 m (223 ft)
- Population (2023): 5,135
  - Density: 128.4/km^{2} (332.5/sq mi)
- Time zone: UTC+01:00 (CET)
  - Summer (DST): UTC+02:00 (CEST)
- INSEE/Postal code: 89464 /89500
- ^{1} French Land Register data, which excludes lakes, ponds, glaciers > 1 km^{2} (0.386 sq mi or 247 acres) and river estuaries.

Villeneuve-sur-Yonne (French pronunciation: [vilnœv syʁ jɔn]) is a commune in the Yonne department in Bourgogne-Franche-Comté in north-central France.

It is surrounded by a partly intact wall, built during the 12th century, which was one of the 8 residences of the French kings.

== Geography ==
The city lies on the bank of the river Yonne, between the cities of Sens and Joigny.

== History ==
The city was founded in 1163 by Louis VII of France to protect the kingdom of France at the boundary of the Champagne. It was a villa longa, a town built around a single road; in this case, the old path between Sens to Joingy, to which were connected 8 roads. In 1204 King Philip II Augustus held parliament in the city, and Louis IX resided in the city before departing for the Eighth Crusade. In 1594 the city was burnt down. During the French Revolution the name was changed from le-Roi (the king) to sur-Yonne (on the Yonne). In 1870 a memorial for the dead was designed by the sculptor Émile Peynot. The city was governed from 1927 till 1931 by the infamous mayor Marcel Pétiot, who was guillotined in 1946, convicted of 26 killings.

== Demography ==
The inhabitants are called Villeneuviens in French.

Historical population

Year	Pop.	±% p.a.
1793	4,605	—
1800	4,885	+0.85%
1806	5,007	+0.41%
1821	4,765	−0.33%
1831	4,966	+0.41%
1836	5,199	+0.92%
1841	4,525	−2.74%
1846	5,357	+3.43%
1851	5,206	−0.57%
1856	5,025	−0.71%
1861	5,018	−0.03%
1866	4,952	−0.26%
1872	5,095	+0.48%
1876	5,084	−0.05%
1881	5,010	−0.29%
1886	5,127	+0.46%
1891	5,117	−0.04%
1896	4,877	−0.96%
1901	4,768	−0.45%

Year	Pop.	±% p.a.
1906	4,666	−0.43%
1911	4,451	−0.94%
1921	3,937	−1.22%
1926	4,099	+0.81%
1931	4,256	+0.75%
1936	4,107	−0.71%
1946	4,321	+0.51%
1954	4,404	+0.24%
1962	4,365	−0.11%
1968	4,451	+0.33%
1975	4,764	+0.98%
1982	4,980	+0.64%
1990	5,054	+0.18%
1999	5,404	+0.75%
2007	5,294	−0.26%
2012	5,326	+0.12%
2017	5,219	−0.41%
2023	5,135	−0.27%

Source: EHESS and INSEE (1968-2023)

== Climate ==
Climate data for Villeneuve-sur-Yonne
Month	Jan	Feb	Mar	Apr	May	Jun	Jul	Aug	Sep	Oct	Nov	Dec	Year
Mean daily maximum °C (°F)	6 (43)	8 (46)	12 (54)	15 (59)	20 (68)	23 (73)	26 (79)	26 (79)	22 (72)	16 (61)	10 (50)	7 (45)	16 (61)
Mean daily minimum °C (°F)	1 (34)	1 (34)	4 (39)	5 (41)	9 (48)	12 (54)	14 (57)	14 (57)	11 (52)	8 (46)	4 (39)	2 (36)	7 (45)
Average rainfall cm (inches)	3.78 (1.49)	3.71 (1.46)	2.96 (1.17)	4.12 (1.62)	4.32 (1.70)	4.14 (1.63)	4.12 (1.62)	3.54 (1.39)	4.1 (1.6)	5.07 (2.00)	4.81 (1.89)	4.21 (1.66)	48.88 (19.23)

== Main sights ==
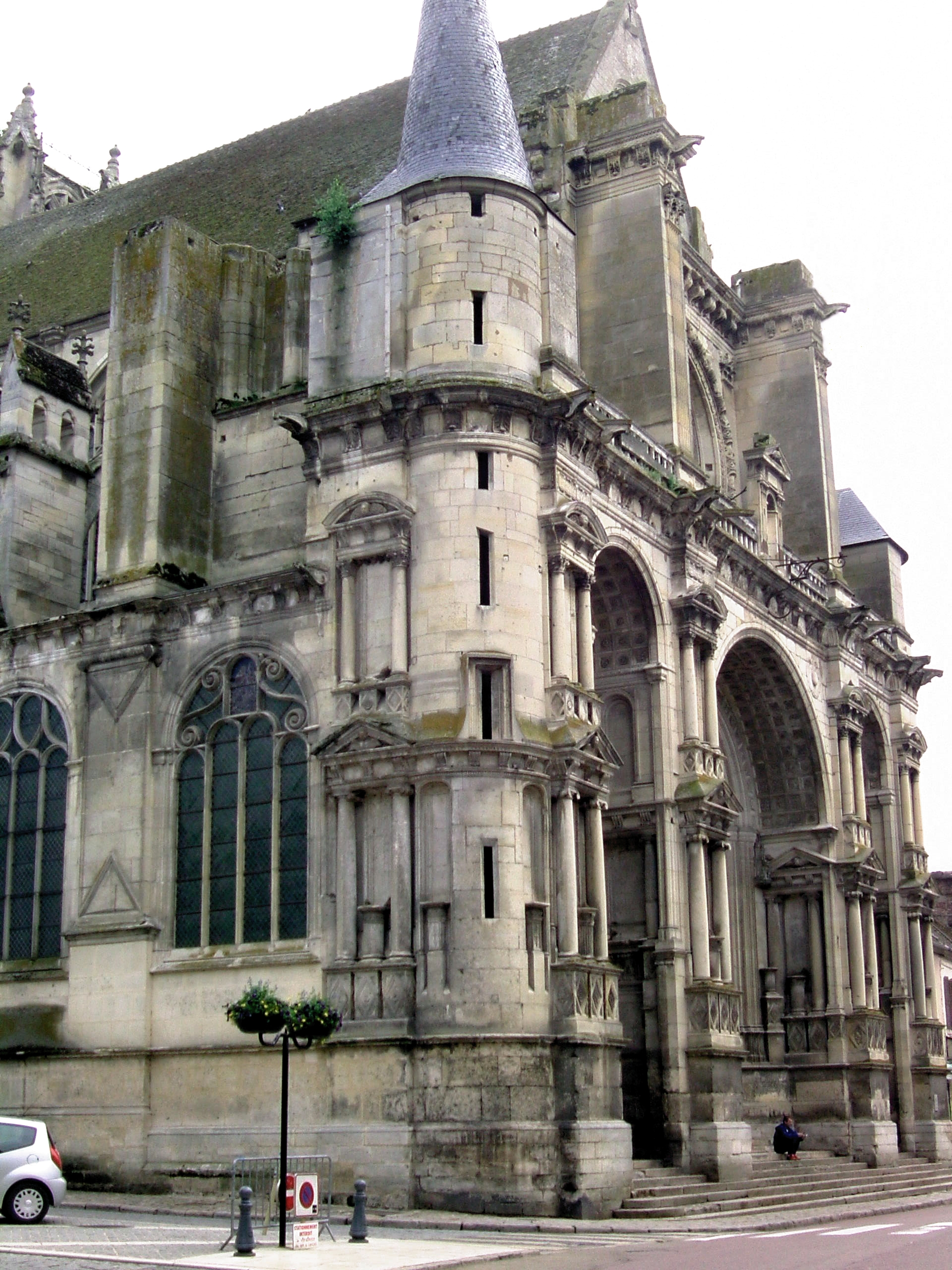
Porch of Notre-Dame de l'Assomption

- Two main entrance gates to the city, Gate of Sens and Gate of Joigny. The Gate of Joigny or Porte de Joigny was rebuilt in the 16th century; the Gate of Sens, or Porte de Sens, predates it by three hundred years and is similar in appearance.
- Gothic and Renaissance Church Notre-Dame de l'Assomption (Our Lady of Assumption).
- City market built during the 19th century by Paul Sédille.
- La Lucarne aux Chouettes or The Owls' Nest restaurant which was run by Leslie Caron, serving Burgundy specialities. The old dilapidated boathouse was bought by her in 1990 on the suggestion of Jean Renoir.
- A Neolithic menhir situated on the bank of the river, in the locality called Pierre-Fritte or Plaine-des-Egriselles.

== Sister and twin cities ==
- Horní Bříza, Czech Republic
- Braubach am Rhein, Germany
- Collingham, United Kingdom

== See also ==
- Communes of the Yonne department
