= Chaumot, Yonne =

Chaumot
- Commune
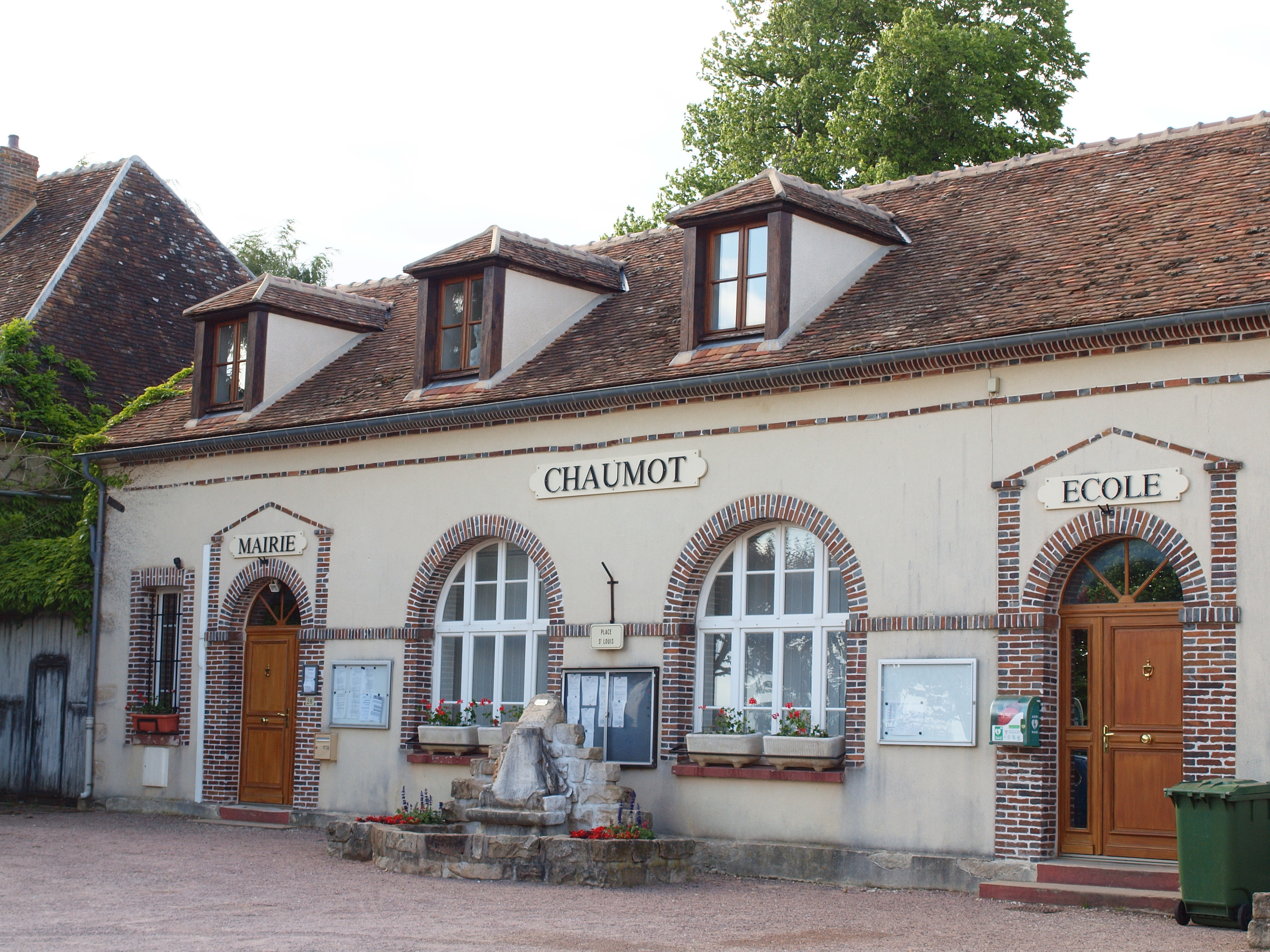
- The town hall in Chaumot

- Coat of arms
- Location of Chaumot
- Location within France Location within Bourgogne-Franche-Comté
- Coordinates: 48°04′54″N 3°13′07″E
- Country: France
- Region: Bourgogne-Franche-Comté
- Department: Yonne
- Arrondissement: Sens
- Canton: Villeneuve-sur-Yonne

Government
  - Mayor (2020–2026): Sylvie Guilpain
- Area^{1}: 14.86 km^{2} (5.74 sq mi)
- Highest elevation: 201 m (659 ft)
- Lowest elevation: 90 m (300 ft)
- Population (2023): 708
  - Density: 47.6/km^{2} (123/sq mi)
- Time zone: UTC+01:00 (CET)
  - Summer (DST): UTC+02:00 (CEST)
- INSEE/Postal code: 89094 /89500
- ^{1} French Land Register data, which excludes lakes, ponds, glaciers > 1 km^{2} (0.386 sq mi or 247 acres) and river estuaries.

Chaumot (French pronunciation: [ʃomo]) is a commune in the Yonne department in Bourgogne-Franche-Comté in north-central France.

== See also ==
- Communes of the Yonne department
