= Dixmont, Yonne =

Dixmont
- Commune
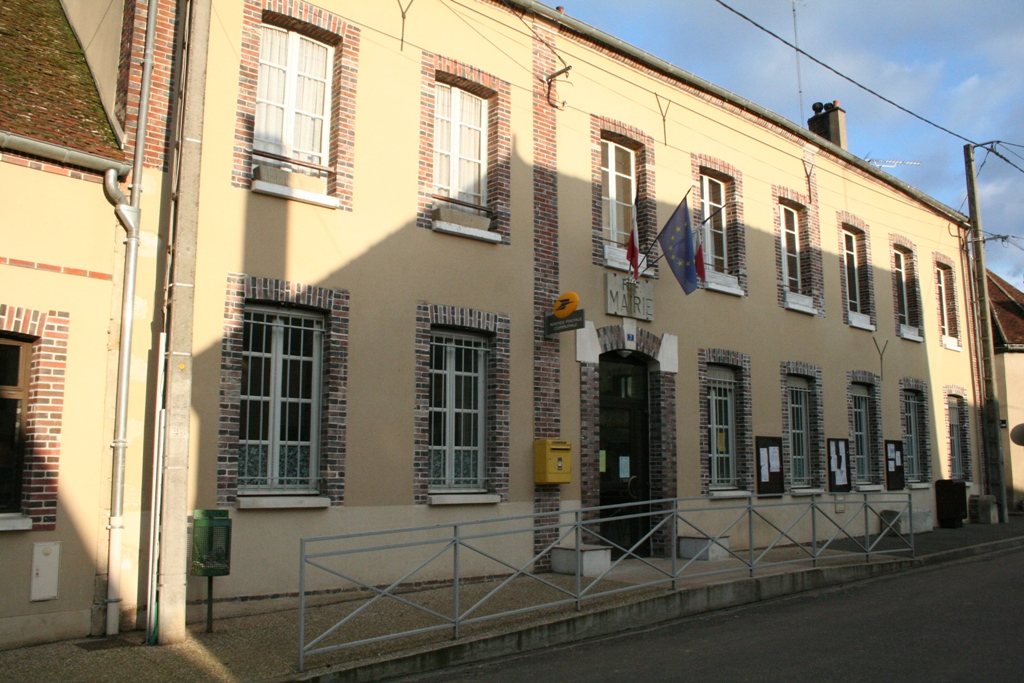
- The town hall in Dixmont

- Coat of arms
- Location of Dixmont
- Location within France Location within Bourgogne-Franche-Comté
- Coordinates: 48°05′01″N 3°24′52″E
- Country: France
- Region: Bourgogne-Franche-Comté
- Department: Yonne
- Arrondissement: Sens
- Canton: Villeneuve-sur-Yonne
- Intercommunality: CA Grand Sénonais

Government
  - Mayor (2020–2026): Marc Botin
- Area^{1}: 42.18 km^{2} (16.29 sq mi)
- Highest elevation: 246 m (807 ft)
- Lowest elevation: 115 m (377 ft)
- Population (2023): 887
  - Density: 21.0/km^{2} (54.5/sq mi)
- Time zone: UTC+01:00 (CET)
  - Summer (DST): UTC+02:00 (CEST)
- INSEE/Postal code: 89142 /89500
- ^{1} French Land Register data, which excludes lakes, ponds, glaciers > 1 km^{2} (0.386 sq mi or 247 acres) and river estuaries.

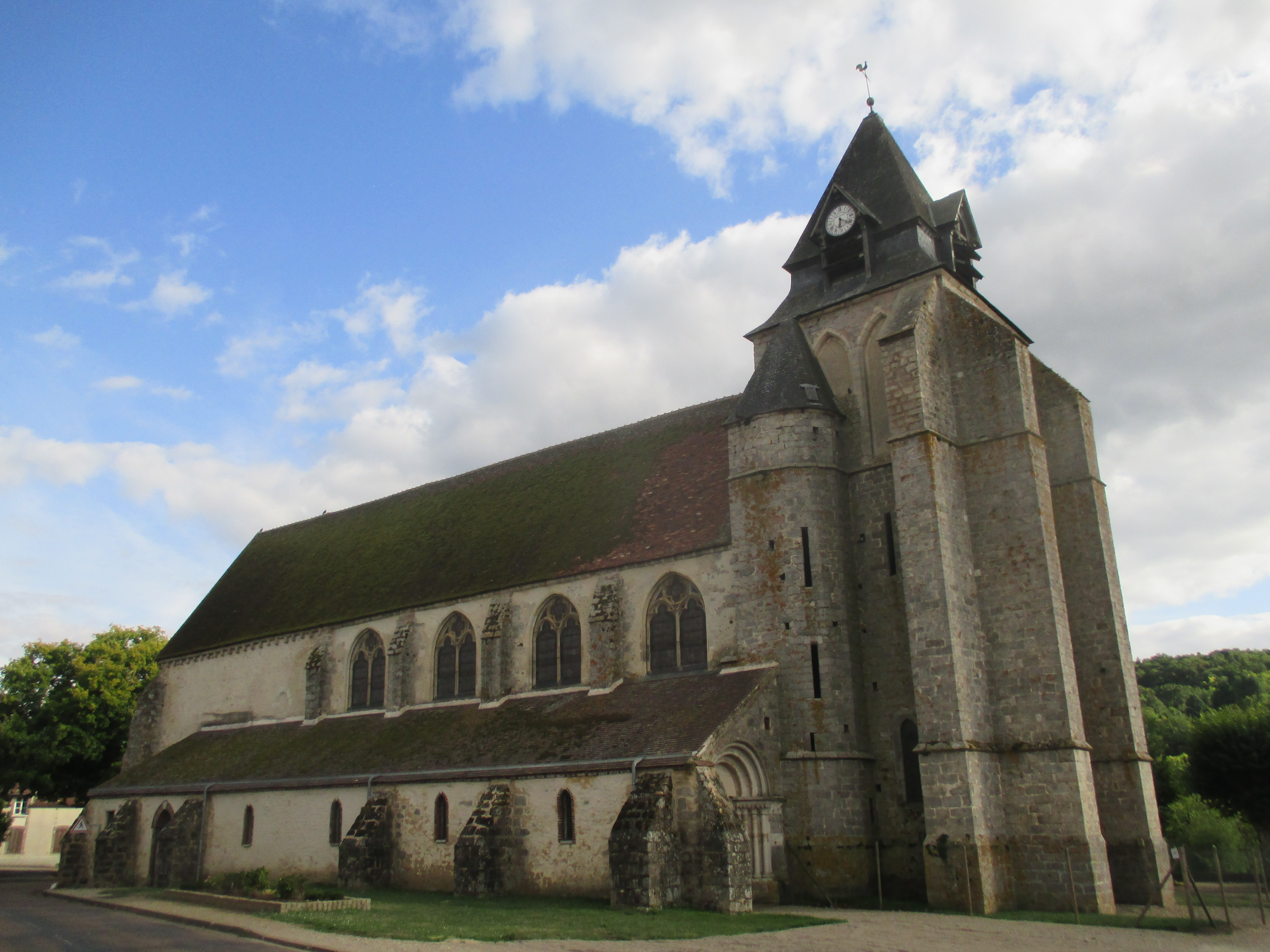
Church.

Dixmont (French pronunciation: [dimɔ̃]) is a commune in the Yonne department in Bourgogne-Franche-Comté in north-central France.

== See also ==
- Communes of the Yonne department
