= Rousson, Yonne =

Rousson
- Commune
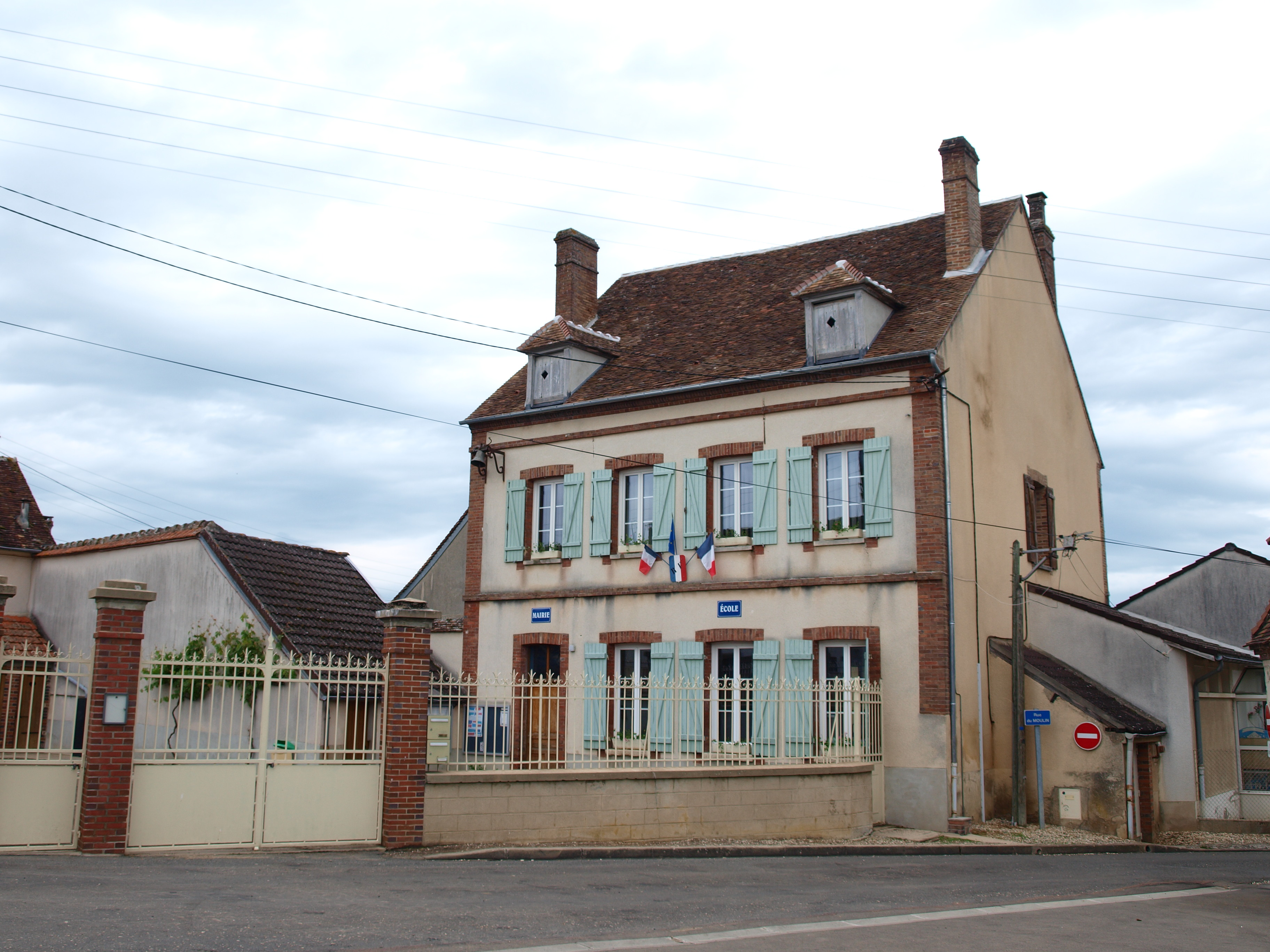
- The town hall in Rousson
- Location of Rousson
- Location within France Location within Bourgogne-Franche-Comté
- Coordinates: 48°05′44″N 3°15′49″E
- Country: France
- Region: Bourgogne-Franche-Comté
- Department: Yonne
- Arrondissement: Sens
- Canton: Villeneuve-sur-Yonne
- Intercommunality: CA Grand Sénonais

Government
  - Mayor (2020–2026): Isabelle Boulmier
- Area^{1}: 5.62 km^{2} (2.17 sq mi)
- Highest elevation: 182 m (597 ft)
- Lowest elevation: 68 m (223 ft)
- Population (2023): 386
  - Density: 68.7/km^{2} (178/sq mi)
- Time zone: UTC+01:00 (CET)
  - Summer (DST): UTC+02:00 (CEST)
- INSEE/Postal code: 89327 /89500
- ^{1} French Land Register data, which excludes lakes, ponds, glaciers > 1 km^{2} (0.386 sq mi or 247 acres) and river estuaries.

Rousson (French pronunciation: [ʁusɔ̃]) is a commune in the Yonne department in Bourgogne-Franche-Comté in north-central France.

== See also ==
- Communes of the Yonne department
