= Véron =

- Commune
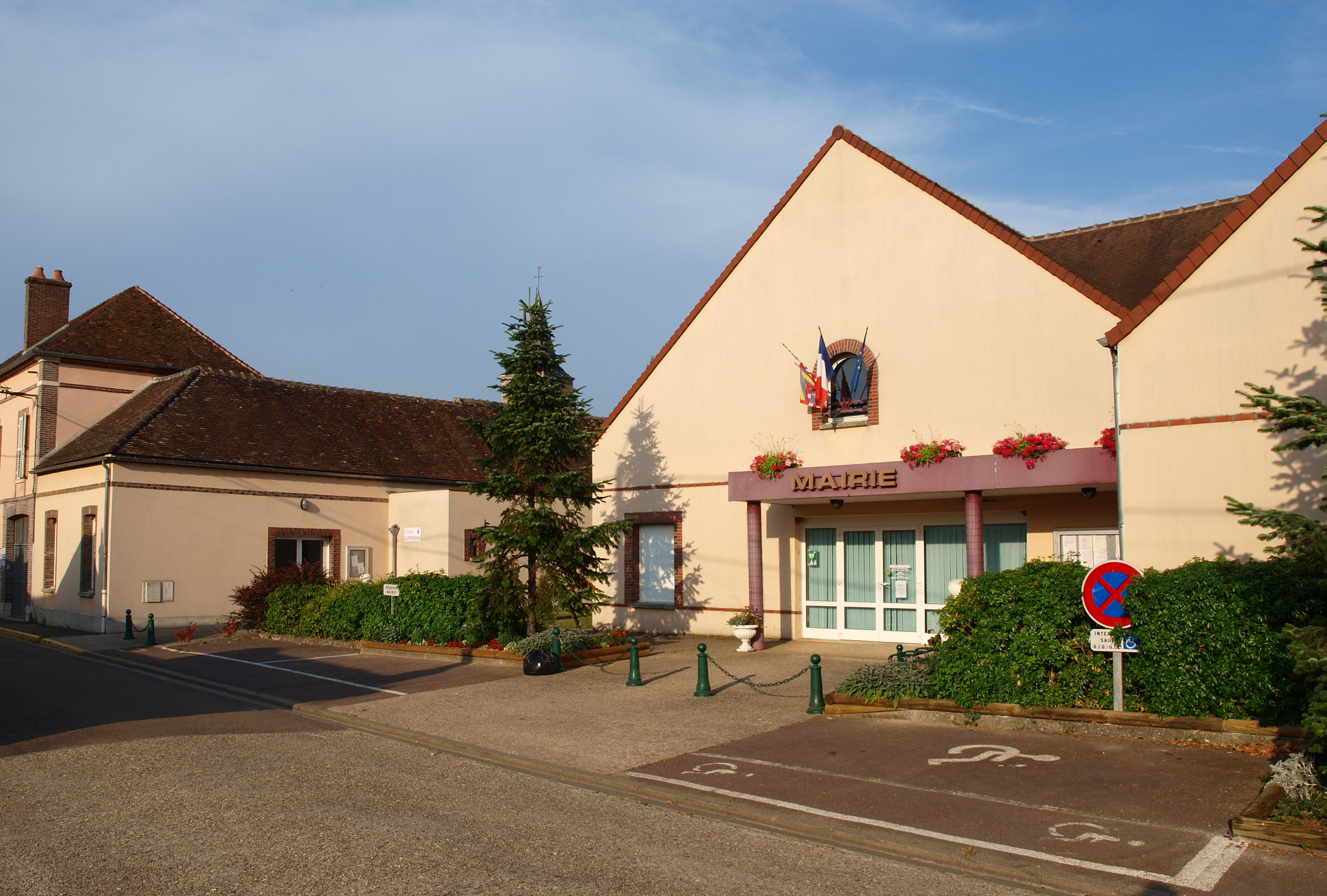
- The town hall in Véron

- Coat of arms
- Location of Véron
- Location within France Location within Bourgogne-Franche-Comté
- Coordinates: 48°07′45″N 3°18′29″E
- Country: France
- Region: Bourgogne-Franche-Comté
- Department: Yonne
- Arrondissement: Sens
- Canton: Villeneuve-sur-Yonne
- Intercommunality: CA Grand Sénonais

Government
  - Mayor (2020–2026): Jean-pierre Gouyon
- Area^{1}: 15.91 km^{2} (6.14 sq mi)
- Highest elevation: 207 m (679 ft)
- Lowest elevation: 67 m (220 ft)
- Population (2023): 1,849
  - Density: 116.2/km^{2} (301.0/sq mi)
- Time zone: UTC+01:00 (CET)
  - Summer (DST): UTC+02:00 (CEST)
- INSEE/Postal code: 89443 /89510
- ^{1} French Land Register data, which excludes lakes, ponds, glaciers > 1 km^{2} (0.386 sq mi or 247 acres) and river estuaries.

Véron (French pronunciation: [veʁɔ̃]) is a commune in the Yonne department in Bourgogne-Franche-Comté in north-central France.

== See also ==
- Communes of the Yonne department
