= Cuy =

Cuy or CUY may refer to:

== Places ==
- Cuy, Oise, in the Oise département
- Cuy, Yonne, in the Yonne département
- Cuy-Saint-Fiacre, in the Seine-Maritime département

== Other ==
- Cuy, the name for the guinea pig (pl. cuyes) in the Andean regions of South America that are generally raised for meat. In the US, a large-sized breed from the Andes is often called a cuy guinea pig.
- CUY: the IATA airport code for Cue Airport in Western Australia.
- CUY, Unión de Rugby de Cuyo in 1988 France rugby union tour of South America
- CuY, the abbreviation of Cu Y Zeolite

== See also ==
- Cuyahoga (disambiguation)
- Cuyo (disambiguation)
