= Évry =

Évry is the name or part of the name of the following communes in France:

- Évry, Essonne, former commune in the Essonne department
- Évry, Yonne, in the Yonne department
- Évry-Courcouronnes, in the Essonne department
- Évry-Grégy-sur-Yerre, in the Seine-et-Marne department
- Évry 2, regional shopping center located in Évry-Courcouronnes
