= Jacques Clément =

French conspirator and assassin (1567–1589)

Jacques Clément TOSD
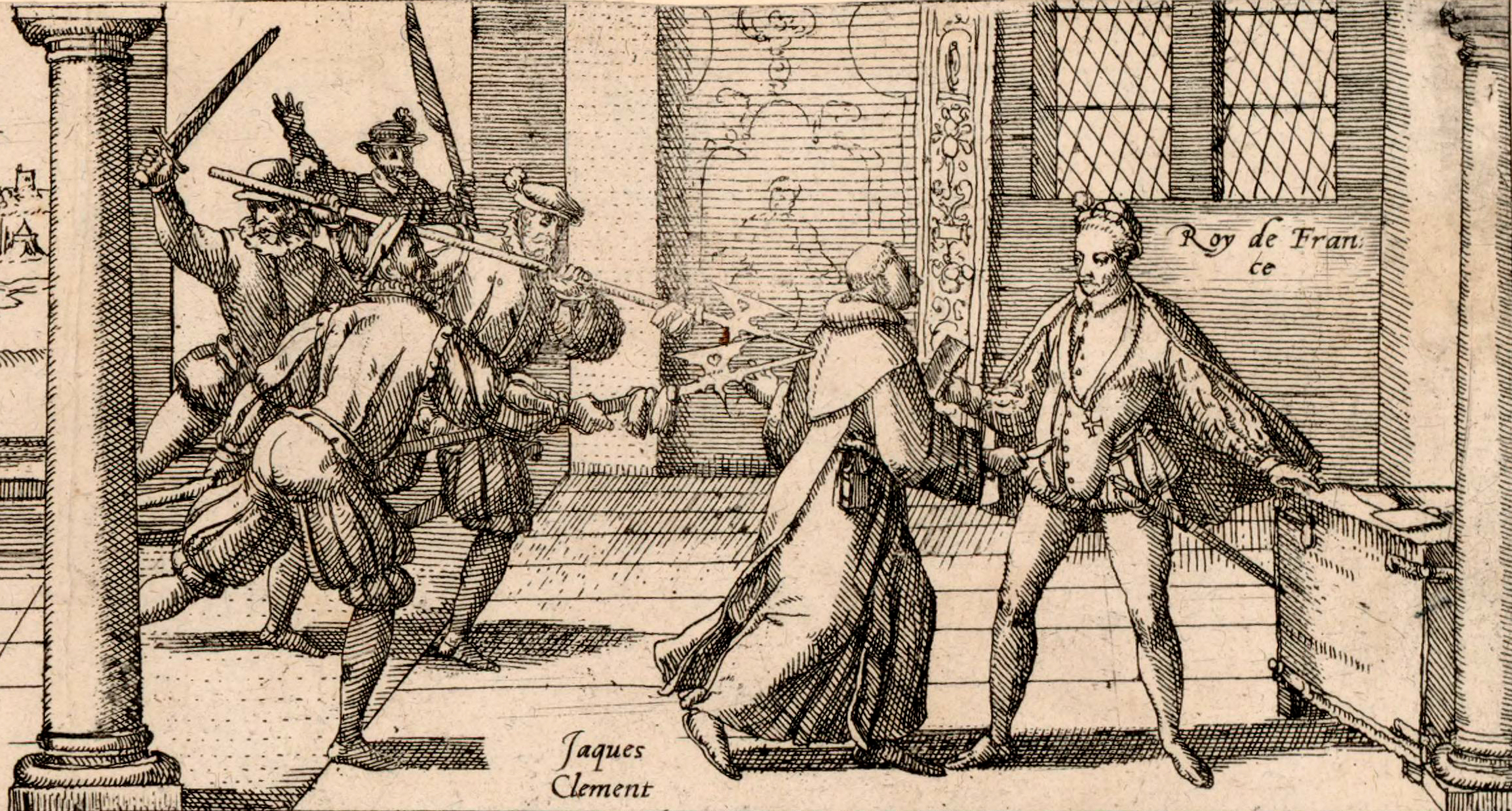
- Jacques Clément assassinating Henry III

Personal life
- Born: 1567 Serbonnes, France
- Died: 1 August 1589 (aged c. 22) Saint-Cloud, France
- Known for: The assassination of Henry III of France in 1589

Religious life
- Religion: Roman Catholicism
- Order: Third Order of Saint Dominic

Jacques Clément (1567 – 1 August 1589) was a French lay brother and the perpetrator of the regicide of King Henry III.

== Early life ==
He was born at Serbonnes, in today's Yonne département, in Burgundy, and became a lay brother of the Third Order of Saint Dominic.

During the French Wars of Religion, Clément became an ardent partisan of the Catholic League. The League's determination to prevent regime change efforts by adherents of Protestantism was inspired by the writings of the English Catholic refugee Richard Verstegan, who published accounts in Antwerp of the recent suffering of English, Welsh, and Irish Catholic Martyrs under the Protestant monarchy of Elizabeth I of England.

The League accordingly viewed Protestantism as a dangerous heresy that must be destroyed to prevent a similar religious persecution of the Catholic Church in France. Clément, as a League supporter, often talked, as was advocated by the Catholic League, of the necessity for a war of extermination against the Huguenots. Clément accordingly opposed the King's beliefs, as a politique, that only a strong and centralised, yet religiously tolerant monarchy with monopoly on political and military power could save France from continued Wars of Religion or even from another Hundred Years War. In retaliation for the recent targeted killings of the Catholic League's leaders; Duke of Guise and his brother, Cardinal de Guise, Clément eventually formed a plan for a decapitation strike of the French government by assassinating Henry III. His ideas were approved by some of the heads of the League, in particular, by the late Duke and Cardinal's sister, Catherine de Guise, Duchess Montpensier. Clément was promised worldly rewards if he survived and eternal bliss for committing tyrannicide if he fell. Having received confidential letters for the king, he left Paris on 31 July 1589 and reached Saint-Cloud, the headquarters of Henry, who was besieging Paris, on 1 August 1589.

== Assassination ==
Clément was admitted to the king's presence, and while he was presenting his letters he told the king he had an important and highly confidential message to deliver. The attendants then withdrew and, as Clément leaned in to whisper in Henry's ear, he mortally wounded him with a dagger concealed beneath his cloak. The assassin was immediately killed by the returning attendants, but Henry III, after pleading with Navarre that his own conversion to Catholicism was the only way to save the Kingdom from protracted civil war, died early in the morning of the following day. Clément's body was posthumously quartered and burned at the stake.

Although traditionally seen by both Protestant and Royalist as an act of fanatical violence, the regicide was viewed with very different feelings by the nobles and commons of Paris, who had expelled the King during the recent Day of the Barricades, and by the many partisans of the League. Catherine de Guise, Duchess Montpensier, who had sanctioned Clément's plans to avenge the recent assassinations of her brothers, is said to have been particularly overjoyed and to have immediately boasted of her own role in plotting the regicide.

Clément was even seen in some circles as a martyr and his actions were praised as tyrannicide by Pope Sixtus V, as well as the Jesuit historian and political philosopher Juan de Mariana, S.J. His praise was such that even the possibility of opening his cause for canonization was discussed. On the other side, atheist philosopher Jean Meslier praised Clément as a freedom fighter against the alleged tyranny represented by Henry III's determination to transform France from a feudal monarchy with a long history of provincial self-government into a centralised and absolute monarchy. Le Laboureur, however, anagrammatized "Frère Jacques Clément" into "C'est l'enfer qui m'a créé" ("It is hell that created me").
