= Edith M. Flanigen =

American chemist (1929–2026)

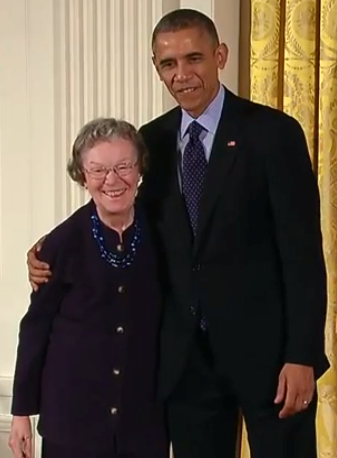
- Flanigen receives the National Medal of Technology from U.S. president Barack Obama in 2014.
- Born: Edith Marie Flanigen; January 28, 1929; Buffalo, New York, U.S.
- Died: January 6, 2026 (aged 96); Buffalo, New York, U.S.
- Education: D'Youville College; Syracuse University (M.S.)
- Known for: Molecular Sieve; Synthetic Emerald; Zeolite Y
- Awards: Perkin Medal (1992); Garvan–Olin Medal (1993); National Inventors Hall of Fame (2002); Lemelson–MIT Lifetime Achievement Award (2004); National Medal of Technology (2012)
- Scientific career
- Fields: Chemistry
- Institutions: Union Carbide, UOP

Edith Marie Flanigen (January 28, 1929 – January 6, 2026) was an American chemist, known for her work on synthesis of emeralds. She was also noted for her work on zeolites and molecular sieves at Union Carbide.

== Early life and education ==
Edith Marie Flanigen was born in Buffalo, New York, on January 28, 1929. She and her two sisters, Joan and Jane, were introduced to chemistry by their high school teacher. The three sisters all went on to study chemistry at D'Youville College. Edith Flanigen graduated class president and valedictorian. Joan and Edith both went on to receive master's degrees in chemistry in inorganic physical chemistry at Syracuse University in 1952. In 2008, Syracuse awarded her an honorary doctorate.

== Career ==
In 1952, Edith Flanigen joined the Union Carbide company. Her job at first was the identification, purification, and extraction of different silicone polymers. In 1956, she moved to the molecular sieves group. In 1973, she was the first woman at Union Carbide to be named corporate research fellow, and in 1986, senior corporate research fellow. She was moved to UOP (a joint venture between Union Carbide and Allied Signal) in 1988, where she was named senior research fellow. Flanigen was promoted to UOP Fellow in 1991. Edith Flanigen retired from UOP in 1994. Following her career at UOP, and through at least 2004, Edith Flanigen remained active professionally, including as a consultant with UOP.

In her 42-year career associated with Union Carbide, Edith Flanigen invented more than 200 different synthetic substances, authored or co-authored over 36 publications, and was awarded at least 109 patents.

== Chemistry ==
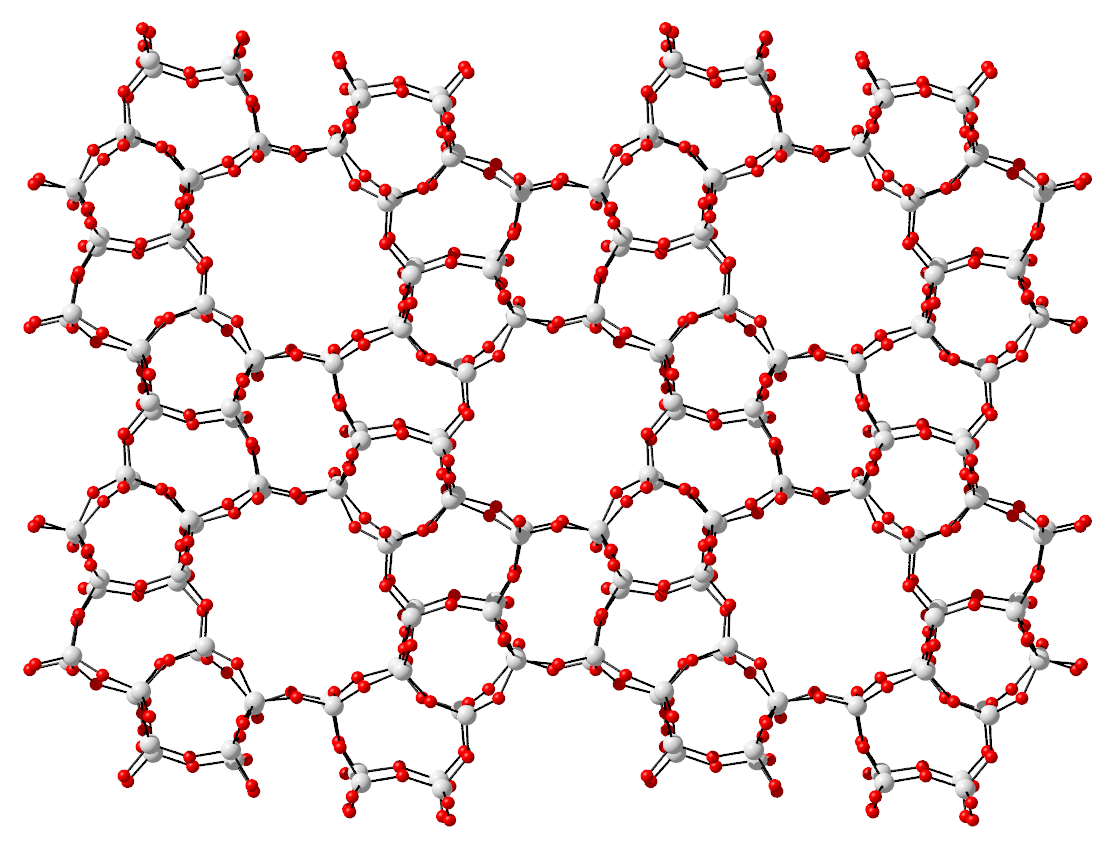
Structure of silicalite, a form of silicon dioxide discovered by Flanigen et al.

In 1956, Flanigen began working on molecular sieves,, which are crystal compounds with molecular-sized pores that can filter or separate very complex substances. Edith Flanigen is best known as the inventor of zeolite Y, a molecular sieve used to refine petroleum. Zeolite Y surpassed Zeolite X before it. When refining "crude oil", or petroleum, it must be separated into all of its different parts, or fractions. Gasoline is one of the many fractions that come from refining petroleum. Flanigen's zeolites are used as catalyst, or a substance that facilitates chemical reactions and increases their rates. Zeolite Y is a catalyst that increases the amount of gasoline that can be fractionated from petroleum, making petroleum refining safer and more productive.

In addition to her work on molecular sieves, Flanigen also co-invented a synthetic emerald,, which Union Carbide produced and sold for many years. The emeralds were mainly used in masers (predecessors to lasers) and, for a time, in jewelry as part of a line marketed as the "Quintessa Collection."

== Death ==
Flanigen died in Buffalo, New York, on January 6, 2026, at the age of 96.

== Publications (selected) ==
- Wilson, Stephen T.; Lok, Brent M.; Messina, Celeste A.; Cannan, Thomas R.; Flanigen, Edith M. (1982). "Aluminophosphate molecular sieves: A new class of microporous crystalline inorganic solids". Journal of the American Chemical Society. 104 (4): 1146–1147. Bibcode:1982JAChS.104.1146W. doi:10.1021/ja00368a062.

== Honors and awards ==
Flanigen was the recipient of many awards and honors. She was, for example, the first woman to receive the Perkin Medal in 1992. She was also inducted into the National Inventors Hall of Fame in 2004.

In 2014, the Edith Flanigen Award was created by the Collaborative Research Centre at Humboldt University of Berlin. The award is to be given annually to an outstanding female scientist at the early stage of her career. The first award was given to Natacha Krins for her work at the University of Paris.

In 2012, Flanigen was named recipient of the National Medal of Technology and Innovation. On November 20, 2014, President Barack Obama presented Flanigen with the National Medal of Technology and Innovation for her contributions to science.

=== Awards ===
- 1991: Chemical Pioneer Award from the American Institute of Chemists
- 1992: Perkin Medal – Edith M. Flanigen was the first female recipient of this medal.
- 1993: Garvan Medal
- 2004: National Inventors Hall of Fame
- 2004: Lemelson–MIT Lifetime Achievement Award
- 2012: Edith M. Flanigen Honeywell invitational lecture in material science series, inaugurated in October 2012
- 2012: National Medal of Technology and Innovation

== See also ==
- Timeline of women in science
