= Pailly =

Pailly refers to the following places:

- Pailly, Vaud, municipality in Switzerland
- Pailly, Yonne, commune in France
