= Vinneuf =

- Commune
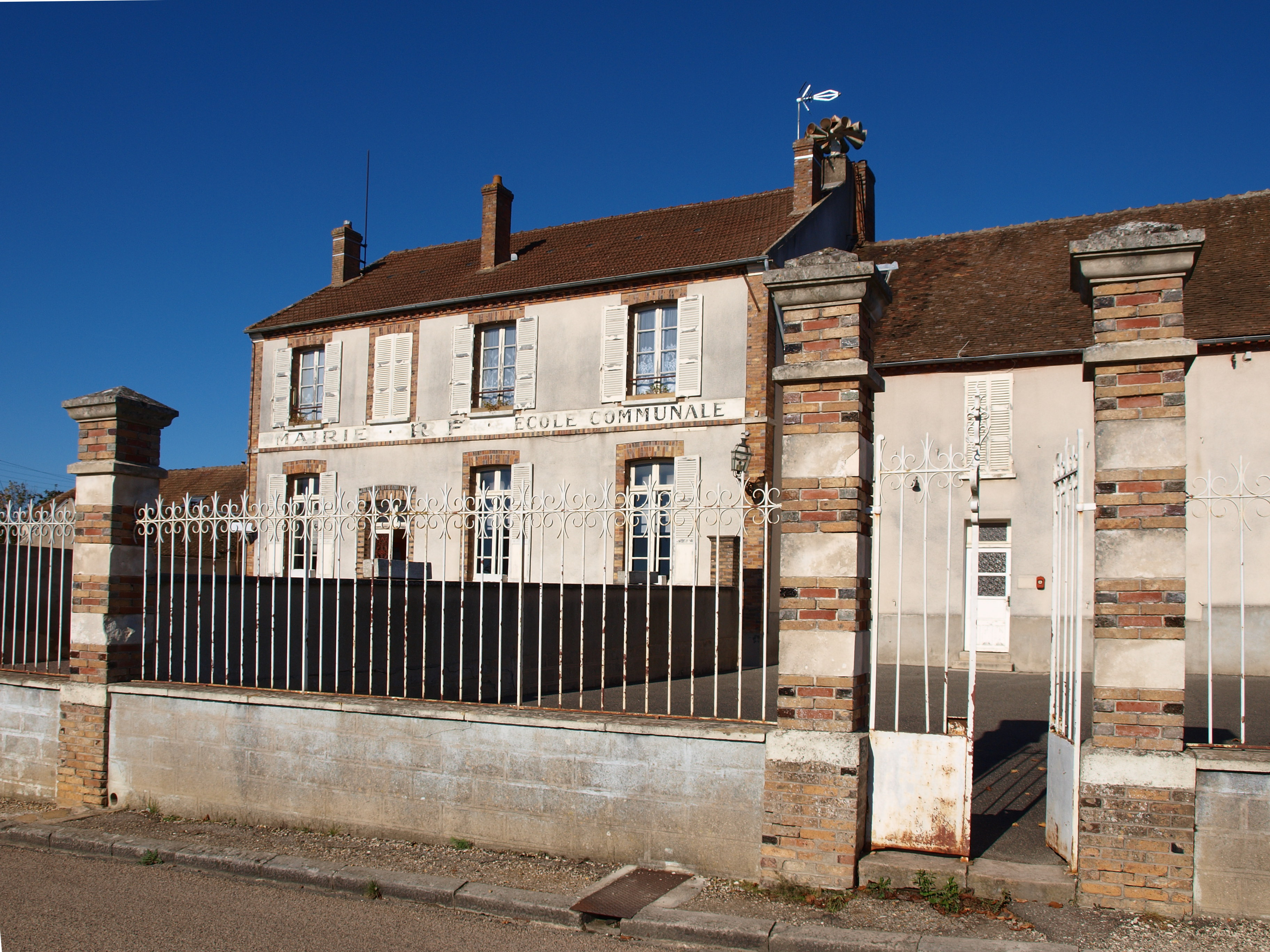
- The town hall and school in Vinneuf
- Location of Vinneuf
- Location within France Location within Bourgogne-Franche-Comté
- Coordinates: 48°21′05″N 3°08′09″E
- Country: France
- Region: Bourgogne-Franche-Comté
- Department: Yonne
- Arrondissement: Sens
- Canton: Thorigny-sur-Oreuse

Government
  - Mayor (2020–2026): Sylvain Nézondet
- Area^{1}: 15.26 km^{2} (5.89 sq mi)
- Highest elevation: 121 m (397 ft)
- Lowest elevation: 54 m (177 ft)
- Population (2023): 1,536
  - Density: 100.7/km^{2} (260.7/sq mi)
- Time zone: UTC+01:00 (CET)
  - Summer (DST): UTC+02:00 (CEST)
- INSEE/Postal code: 89480 /89140
- ^{1} French Land Register data, which excludes lakes, ponds, glaciers > 1 km^{2} (0.386 sq mi or 247 acres) and river estuaries.

Vinneuf (French pronunciation: [vinœf]) is a commune in the Yonne department in Bourgogne-Franche-Comté in north-central France.

== See also ==
- Communes of the Yonne department
