= Michery =

- Commune
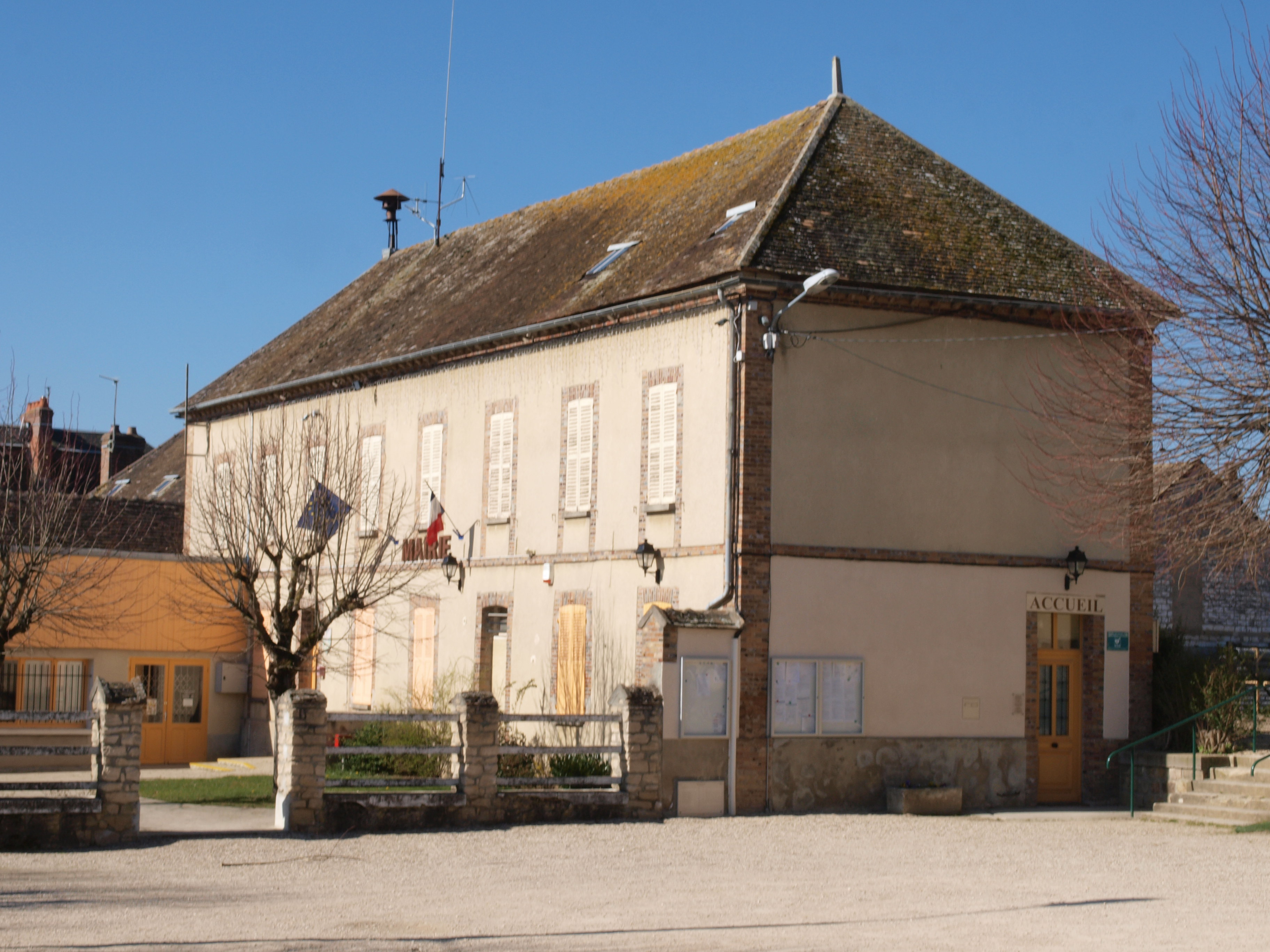
- The town hall in Michery

- Coat of arms
- Location of Michery
- Location within France Location within Bourgogne-Franche-Comté
- Coordinates: 48°18′36″N 3°14′08″E
- Country: France
- Region: Bourgogne-Franche-Comté
- Department: Yonne
- Arrondissement: Sens
- Canton: Thorigny-sur-Oreuse

Government
  - Mayor (2020–2026): Gérard Michaut
- Area^{1}: 17.05 km^{2} (6.58 sq mi)
- Highest elevation: 180 m (590 ft)
- Lowest elevation: 58 m (190 ft)
- Population (2023): 1,078
  - Density: 63.23/km^{2} (163.8/sq mi)
- Time zone: UTC+01:00 (CET)
  - Summer (DST): UTC+02:00 (CEST)
- INSEE/Postal code: 89255 /89140
- ^{1} French Land Register data, which excludes lakes, ponds, glaciers > 1 km^{2} (0.386 sq mi or 247 acres) and river estuaries.

Michery (French pronunciation: [miʃʁi]) is a commune in the Yonne department in Bourgogne-Franche-Comté in north-central France.

== See also ==
- Communes of the Yonne department
