= Courlon-sur-Yonne =

- Commune
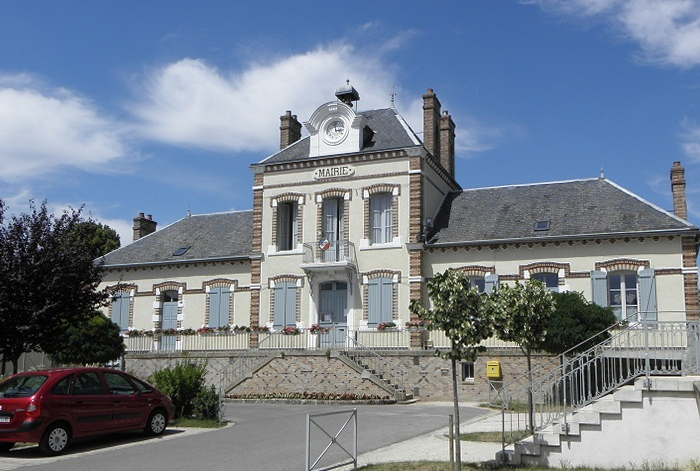
- The town hall in Courlon-sur-Yonne
- Location of Courlon-sur-Yonne
- Location within France Location within Bourgogne-Franche-Comté
- Coordinates: 48°20′22″N 3°09′58″E
- Country: France
- Region: Bourgogne-Franche-Comté
- Department: Yonne
- Arrondissement: Sens
- Canton: Thorigny-sur-Oreuse

Government
  - Mayor (2020–2026): Christina Rangdet
- Area^{1}: 16.73 km^{2} (6.46 sq mi)
- Highest elevation: 138 m (453 ft)
- Lowest elevation: 54 m (177 ft)
- Population (2023): 1,183
  - Density: 70.71/km^{2} (183.1/sq mi)
- Time zone: UTC+01:00 (CET)
  - Summer (DST): UTC+02:00 (CEST)
- INSEE/Postal code: 89124 /89140
- ^{1} French Land Register data, which excludes lakes, ponds, glaciers > 1 km^{2} (0.386 sq mi or 247 acres) and river estuaries.

Courlon-sur-Yonne (French pronunciation: [kuʁlɔ̃ syʁ jɔn], literally Courlon on Yonne) is a commune in the Yonne department in Bourgogne-Franche-Comté in north-central France.

== See also ==
- Communes of the Yonne department
