= Perceneige =

- Commune
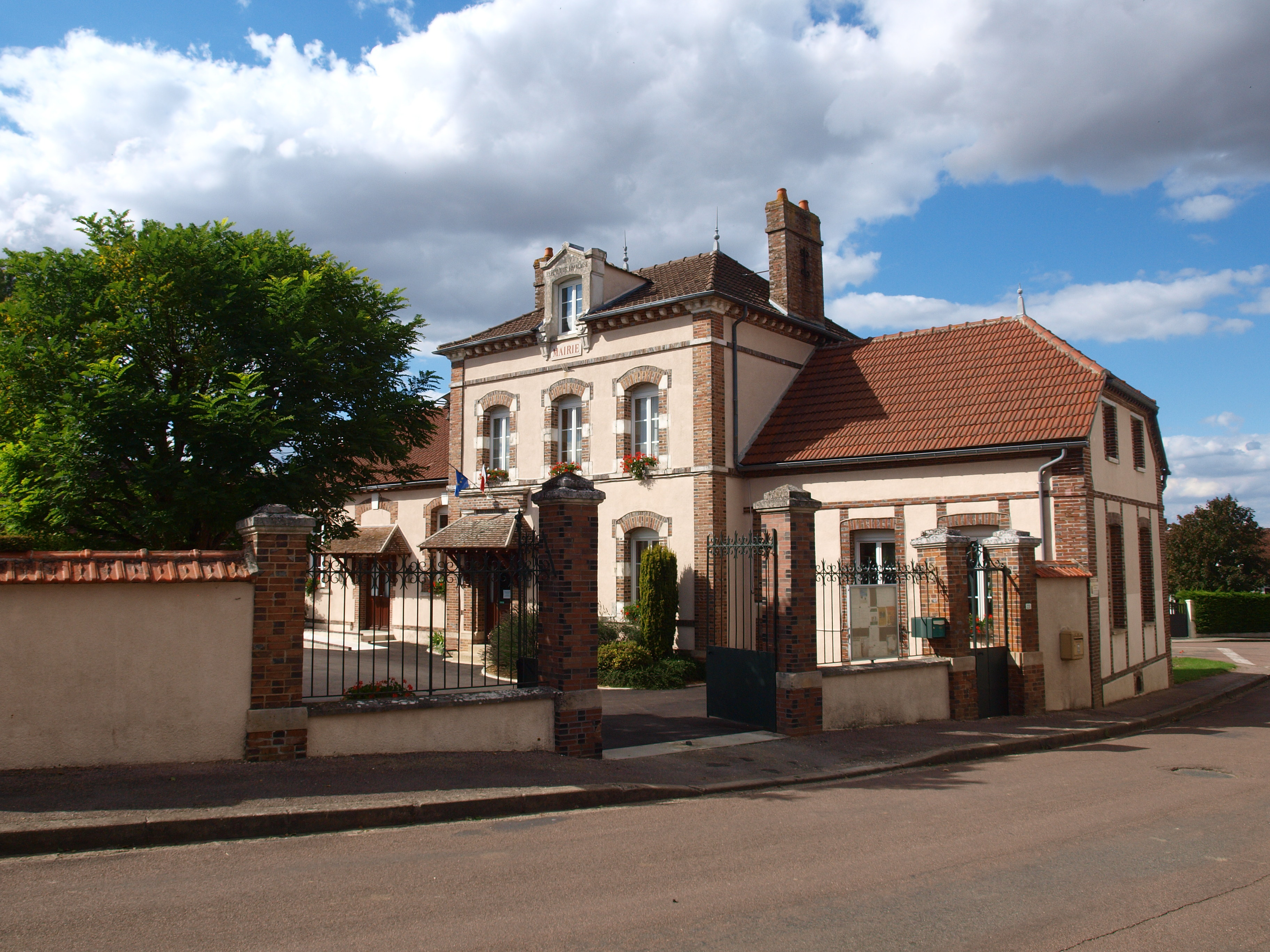
- The town hall in Perceneige
- Location of Perceneige
- Location within France Location within Bourgogne-Franche-Comté
- Coordinates: 48°21′13″N 3°24′30″E
- Country: France
- Region: Bourgogne-Franche-Comté
- Department: Yonne
- Arrondissement: Sens
- Canton: Thorigny-sur-Oreuse

Government
  - Mayor (2020–2026): Florence Gesserand
- Area^{1}: 60.99 km^{2} (23.55 sq mi)
- Highest elevation: 209 m (686 ft)
- Lowest elevation: 92 m (302 ft)
- Population (2023): 940
  - Density: 15/km^{2} (40/sq mi)
- Time zone: UTC+01:00 (CET)
  - Summer (DST): UTC+02:00 (CEST)
- INSEE/Postal code: 89469 /89260
- ^{1} French Land Register data, which excludes lakes, ponds, glaciers > 1 km^{2} (0.386 sq mi or 247 acres) and river estuaries.

Perceneige (French pronunciation: [pɛʁsənɛʒ]) is a commune in the Yonne department in Bourgogne-Franche-Comté in north-central France.

== See also ==
- Communes of the Yonne department
