= Gisy-les-Nobles =

- Commune
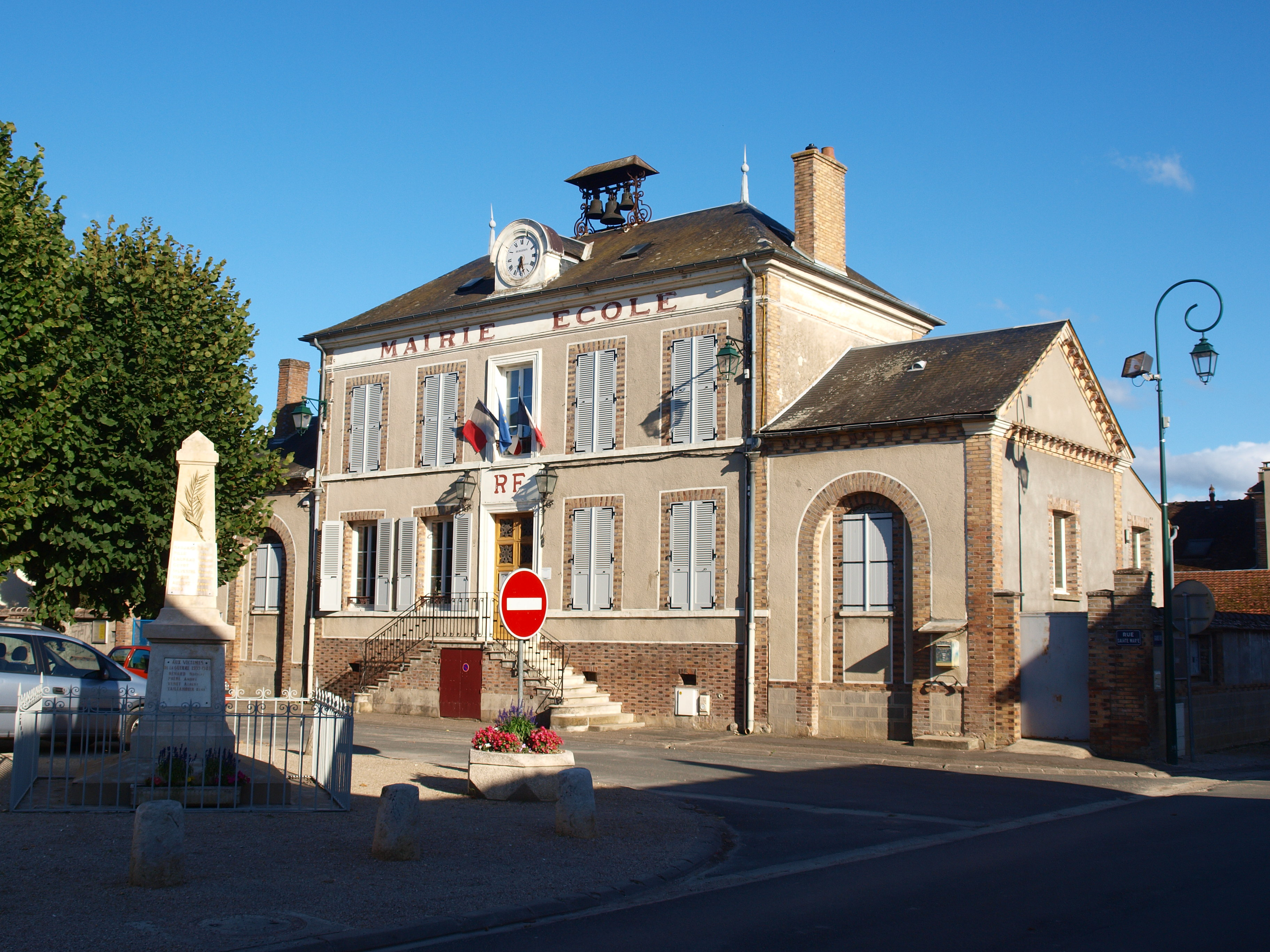
- The town hall in Gisy-les-Nobles
- Location of Gisy-les-Nobles
- Location within France Location within Bourgogne-Franche-Comté
- Coordinates: 48°16′54″N 3°14′44″E
- Country: France
- Region: Bourgogne-Franche-Comté
- Department: Yonne
- Arrondissement: Sens
- Canton: Thorigny-sur-Oreuse

Government
  - Mayor (2020–2026): Patrick Babouhot
- Area^{1}: 10.91 km^{2} (4.21 sq mi)
- Highest elevation: 181 m (594 ft)
- Lowest elevation: 60 m (200 ft)
- Population (2023): 545
  - Density: 50.0/km^{2} (129/sq mi)
- Time zone: UTC+01:00 (CET)
  - Summer (DST): UTC+02:00 (CEST)
- INSEE/Postal code: 89189 /89140
- ^{1} French Land Register data, which excludes lakes, ponds, glaciers > 1 km^{2} (0.386 sq mi or 247 acres) and river estuaries.

Gisy-les-Nobles (French pronunciation: [ʒizi le nɔbl]) is a commune in the Yonne department in Bourgogne-Franche-Comté in north-central France.

== See also ==
- Communes of the Yonne department
