= Canton of Thorigny-sur-Oreuse =

Coordinates: 48.29°N 3.40°E

The canton of Thorigny-sur-Oreuse is an administrative division of the Yonne department, central France. It was created at the French canton reorganisation which came into effect in March 2015. Its seat is in Thorigny-sur-Oreuse.

It consists of the following communes:

1. La Chapelle-sur-Oreuse
2. Compigny
3. Courlon-sur-Yonne
4. Cuy
5. Évry
6. Gisy-les-Nobles
7. Michery
8. Pailly
9. Perceneige
10. Plessis-Saint-Jean
11. Saint-Denis-lès-Sens
12. Serbonnes
13. Sergines
14. Soucy
15. Thorigny-sur-Oreuse
16. Vinneuf
17. Voisines
