= Cuyo =

Cuyo may refer to:

- Cuyo (Argentina)
- Cuyo Province, historic, Argentina
- Cuyo, Palawan, Philippines
- Cuyo Airport, Philippines
- Cuyo Archipelago, Philippines
- 1917 Cuyo, an Amor asteroid

== See also ==
- Cuy (disambiguation)
