= Barthélemy Faujas de Saint-Fond =

French geologist (1741–1819)

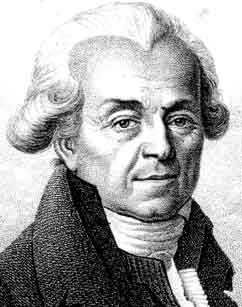
- Barthélemy Faujas de Saint-Fond
- Born: 17 May 1741; Montélimar, France
- Died: 18 July 1819 (aged 78)
- Occupation: geology
- Employer: Jardin des Plantes

Barthélemy Faujas de Saint-Fond (17 May 1741 – 18 July 1819) was a French geologist, volcanologist and traveller.

== Life ==
He was born at Montélimar. He was educated at the Jesuit's College at Lyon and afterwards at Grenoble where he studied law and was admitted as an advocate to the parlement.

He rose to be president of the seneschal's court in Montélimar (1765), where he acquitted himself with distinction. However, he became disenchanted with law and wished to pursue his love of nature that had begun earlier in his life. His favourite pastime was visiting the mountain regions in the Alps and Massif Central. There he began to study the forms, structure, composition and superposition of rocks.

In 1775 in the Velay, he discovered a rich deposit of pozzuolana, that was eventually mined by the government. In 1776, he established a relationship with Buffon, who recognised the value of his scientific efforts immediately. Invited by Buffon to Paris, Faujas ceased his legal work and was appointed assistant naturalist to the natural history museum by Louis XVI. Later, he was appointed royal commissioner for mines.

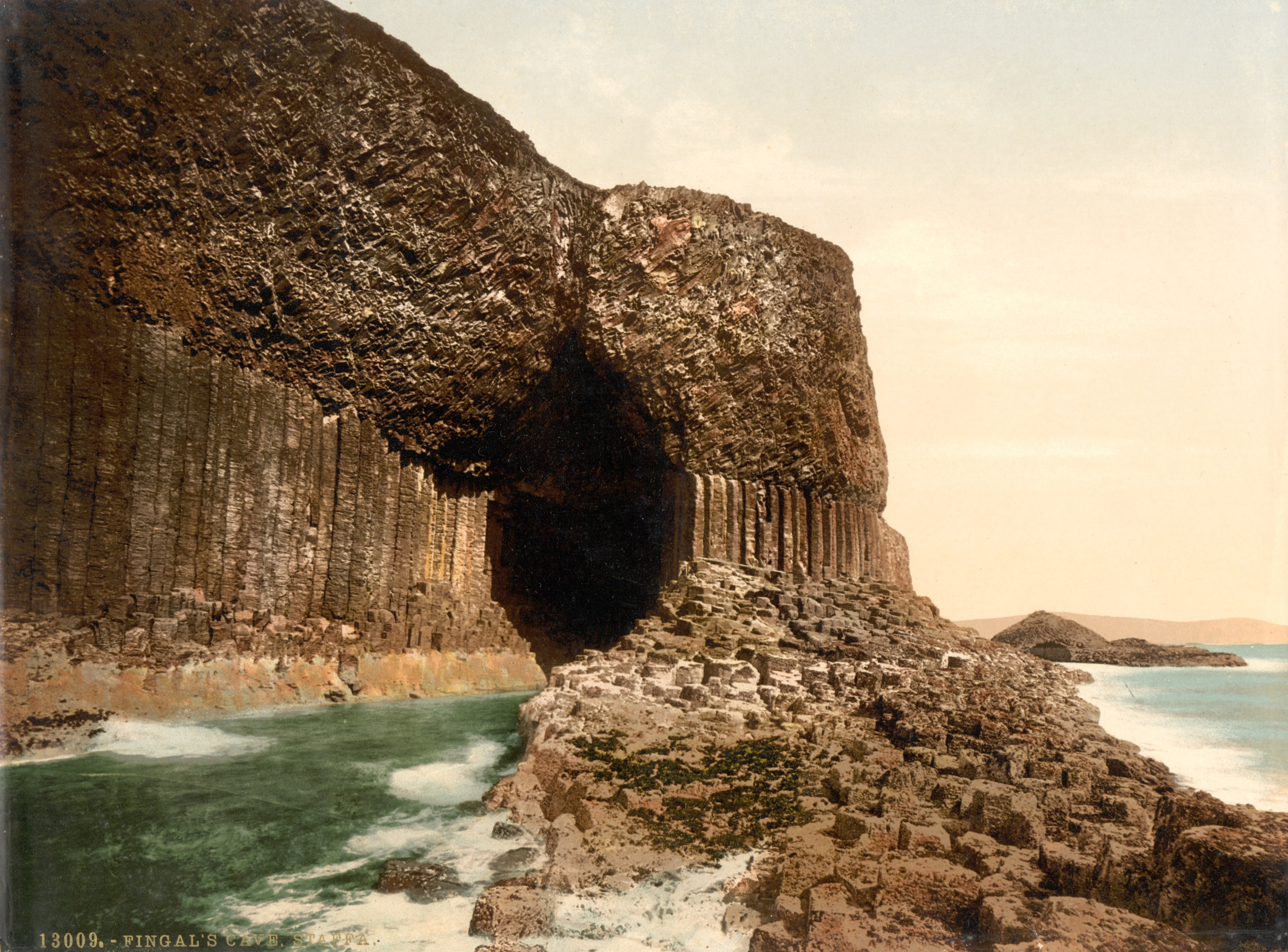
Fingal's Cave ca. 1900

One of his most important works was Recherches sur les volcans éteints du Vivarais et du Velay, which appeared in 1778. This publication documented his astute observations allowing Faujas to develop a theory about the origin of volcanoes. In his capacity of commissioner for mines Faujas travelled to most European countries where he closely observed the natural environment and the rock formations. In Britain he met William and Caroline Herschel. He however was determined to visit Staffa and he set out with the American polymath William Thornton and the Italian balloonist Count Andreani.

Faujas was the first to recognize the volcanic nature of the basaltic columns of Fingal's Cave, on Staffa. The island was visited earlier in 1772 by Sir Joseph Banks, who remarked that the stone was a coarse kind of basalt, very much resembling the Giant's Causeway in Ireland (as noted in Pennant's Tour in Scotland and Voyage to the Hebrides). Faujas' Voyage en Angleterre, en Écosse et aux Îles Hébrides (1797) contains anecdotes about Sir Joseph Banks, William and Caroline Herschel and Dr. John Whitehurst, including an amusing account of The Dinner of an Academic Club (the Royal Society). It was shortly translated into English (2 vols., 1799).

In 1785, Faujas was named king's commissioner to factories, armories, and royal forests. This brought a salary of 4,000 livres, and 2,000 livres for travelling expenses, in addition to his 6,000 livres for the assistant naturalist post.

Faujas was appointed the first professor of geology at the Jardin des Plantes in 1793, a post he held until he was nearly eighty years of age. In 1794, he secured the skull of Mosasaurus, when Maastricht was captured, and moved it to Paris. He retired in 1818 to the estate of Saint-Fond in Dauphiné.

Faujas had a keen interest in the balloon experiments of the Montgolfier brothers, and published the very complete 2 volume work, Description des expériences de la machine aérostatique de MM. Montgolfier, &c. (1783, 1784). He also contributed many scientific memoirs to the Annales and the Mémoires of the museum of natural history. Among his other works are: Histoire naturelle de la province de Dauphiné (1781), Minéralogie des volcans (1784), and Essai de géologie (1803–1809).

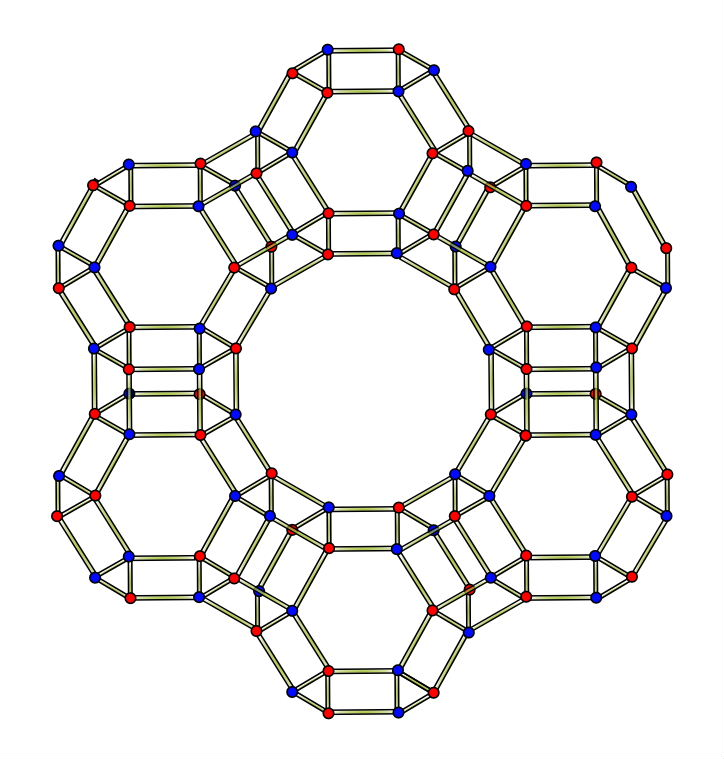
Structure of Faujasite

The mineral faujasite is named after him.

== Works ==
- Description des experiences de la machine aerostatique de MM. de Montgolfier, et de celles auxquelles cette decouverte a donne lieu (in Italian). Genova: Stamperia Gesiniana. 1784.
