= La Chapelle-sur-Oreuse =

- Commune
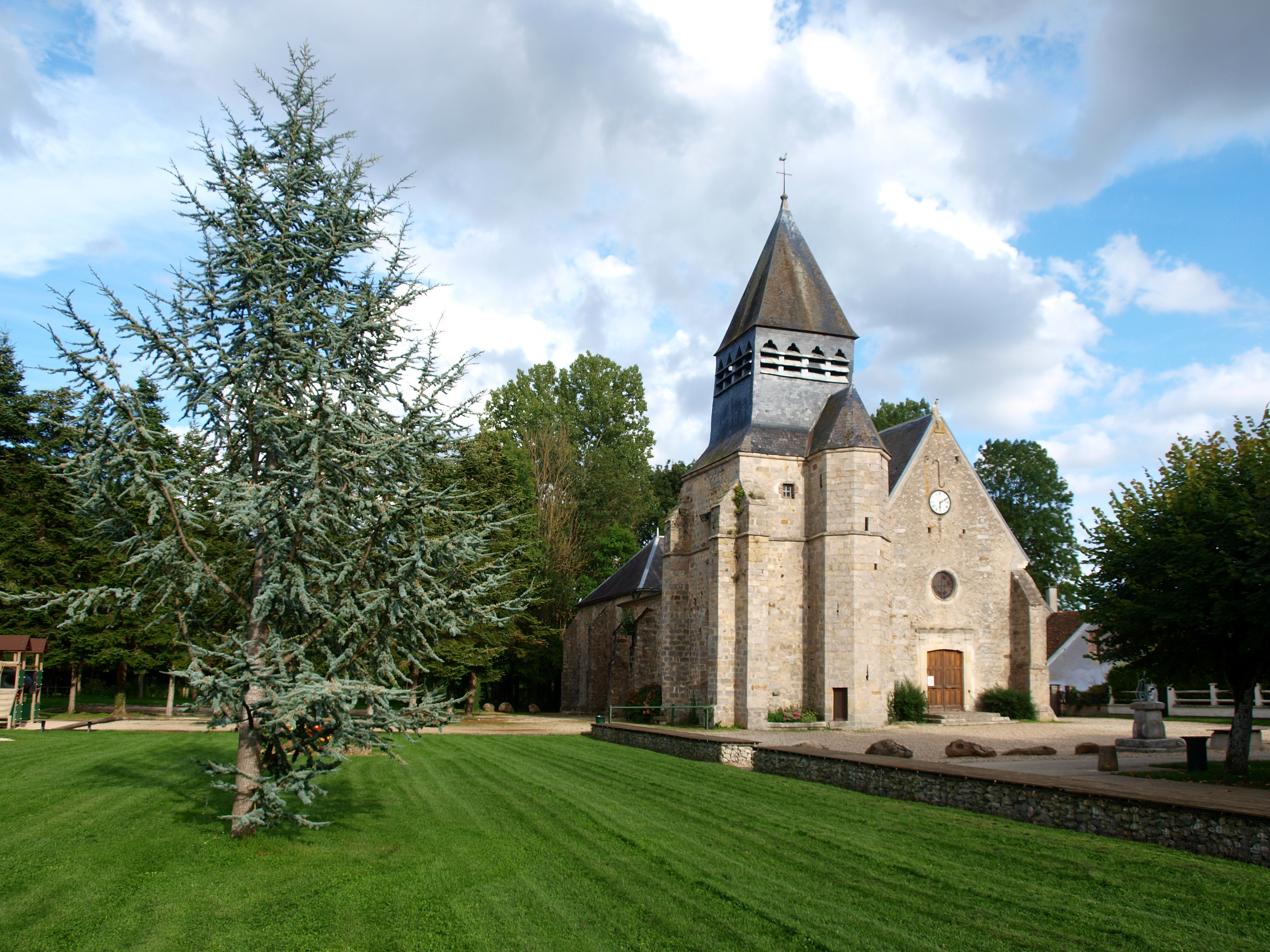
- The church in La Chapelle-sur-Oreuse

- Coat of arms
- Location of La Chapelle-sur-Oreuse
- Location within France Location within Bourgogne-Franche-Comté
- Coordinates: 48°17′24″N 3°18′30″E
- Country: France
- Region: Bourgogne-Franche-Comté
- Department: Yonne
- Arrondissement: Sens
- Canton: Thorigny-sur-Oreuse

Government
  - Mayor (2024–2026): Laurent Marty
- Area^{1}: 17.92 km^{2} (6.92 sq mi)
- Highest elevation: 185 m (607 ft)
- Lowest elevation: 66 m (217 ft)
- Population (2023): 667
  - Density: 37.2/km^{2} (96.4/sq mi)
- Time zone: UTC+01:00 (CET)
  - Summer (DST): UTC+02:00 (CEST)
- INSEE/Postal code: 89080 /89260
- ^{1} French Land Register data, which excludes lakes, ponds, glaciers > 1 km^{2} (0.386 sq mi or 247 acres) and river estuaries.

La Chapelle-sur-Oreuse (French pronunciation: [la ʃapɛl syʁ ɔʁøz]) is a commune in the Yonne department in Bourgogne-Franche-Comté in north-central France.

== See also ==
- Communes of the Yonne department
