= Sergines =

- Commune
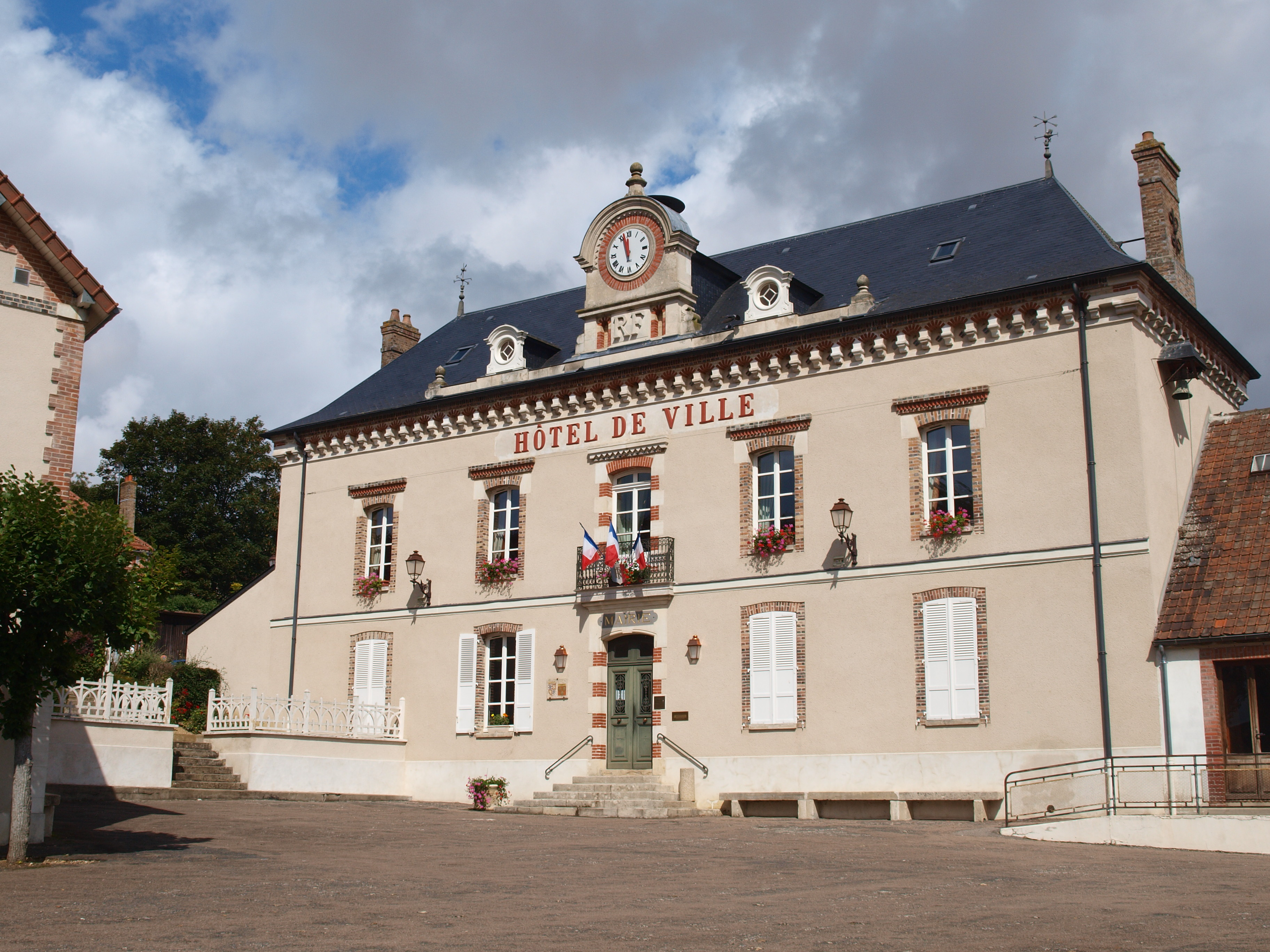
- The town hall in Sergines

- Coat of arms
- Location of Sergines
- Location within France Location within Bourgogne-Franche-Comté
- Coordinates: 48°20′34″N 3°15′44″E
- Country: France
- Region: Bourgogne-Franche-Comté
- Department: Yonne
- Arrondissement: Sens
- Canton: Thorigny-sur-Oreuse

Government
  - Mayor (2020–2026): André Pitou
- Area^{1}: 18.96 km^{2} (7.32 sq mi)
- Highest elevation: 157 m (515 ft)
- Lowest elevation: 73 m (240 ft)
- Population (2023): 1,223
  - Density: 64.50/km^{2} (167.1/sq mi)
- Time zone: UTC+01:00 (CET)
  - Summer (DST): UTC+02:00 (CEST)
- INSEE/Postal code: 89391 /89140
- ^{1} French Land Register data, which excludes lakes, ponds, glaciers > 1 km^{2} (0.386 sq mi or 247 acres) and river estuaries.

Sergines (French pronunciation: [sɛʁʒin]) is a commune in the Yonne department in Bourgogne-Franche-Comté in north-central France.

== See also ==
- Communes of the Yonne department
