= Thorigny-sur-Oreuse =

- Commune
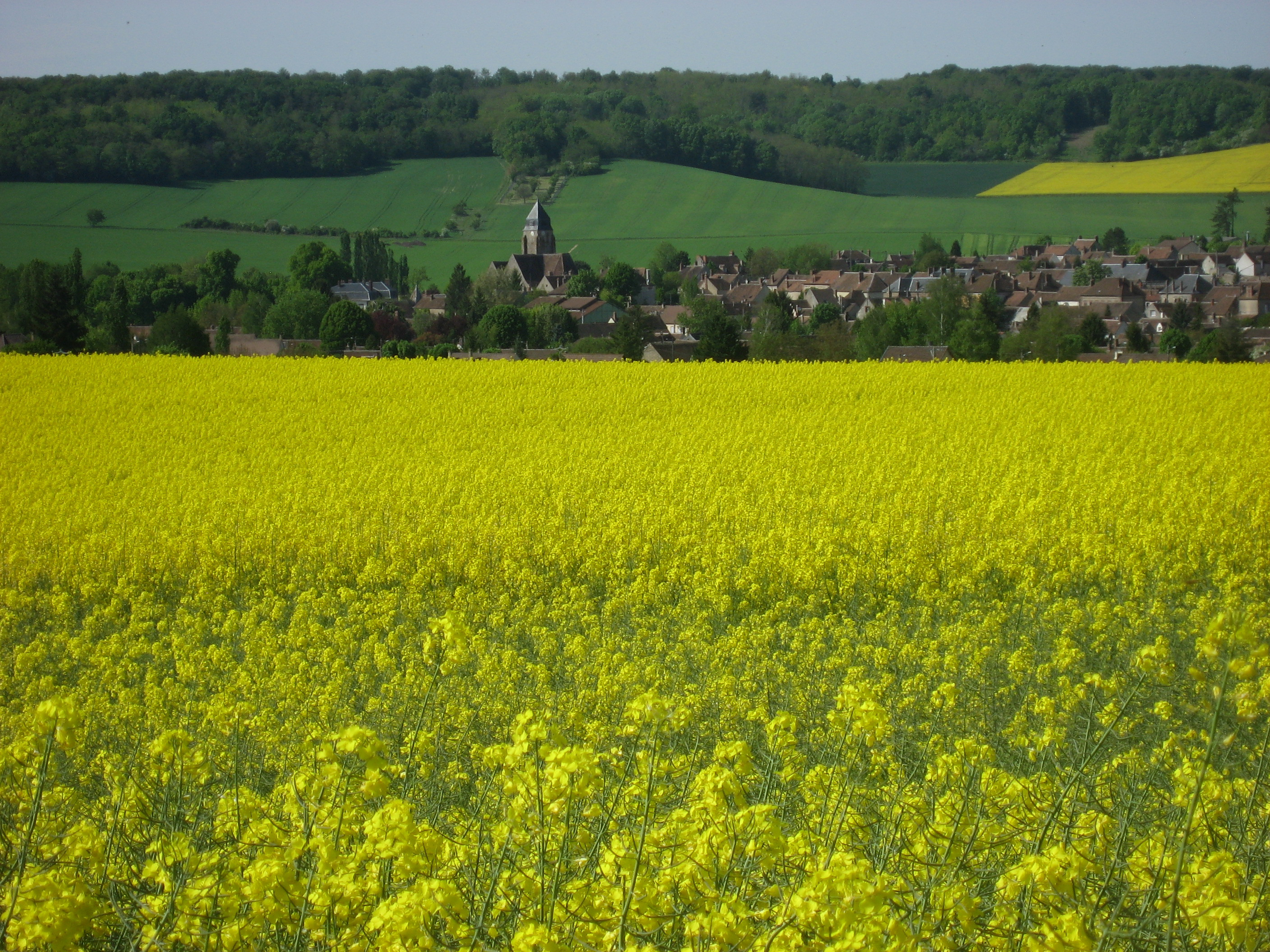
- Thorigny-sur-Oreuse in spring colours
- Location of Thorigny-sur-Oreuse
- Location within France Location within Bourgogne-Franche-Comté
- Coordinates: 48°17′36″N 3°24′03″E
- Country: France
- Region: Bourgogne-Franche-Comté
- Department: Yonne
- Arrondissement: Sens
- Canton: Thorigny-sur-Oreuse
- Area^{1}: 49.23 km^{2} (19.01 sq mi)
- Highest elevation: 206 m (676 ft)
- Lowest elevation: 83 m (272 ft)
- Population (2023): 1,396
  - Density: 28.36/km^{2} (73.44/sq mi)
- Time zone: UTC+01:00 (CET)
  - Summer (DST): UTC+02:00 (CEST)
- INSEE/Postal code: 89414 /89260
- Website: http://www.thorigny.net
- ^{1} French Land Register data, which excludes lakes, ponds, glaciers > 1 km^{2} (0.386 sq mi or 247 acres) and river estuaries.

Thorigny-sur-Oreuse is a commune in the Yonne department in Bourgogne-Franche-Comté in north-central France.

== History ==
The history of the village from the pre-historic and Roman periods has been well documented in the book written in 1886 by the abbot Henri Bouvier Histoire de Thorigny-sur-Oreuse.

An effort by the heritage society "Les amis de Thorigny" attempts to bring to light the historical importance of this ancient village and to protect the important monuments such as the sloping medieval church with still visible military fortifications and which was built on the source of the Oreuse river, the gardens of the Château du Thorigny which was dismantled during the revolution, the Château de Fleurigny and the Commanderie de Launay.

== See also ==
- Communes of the Yonne department
