= Saint-Denis-lès-Sens =

- Commune
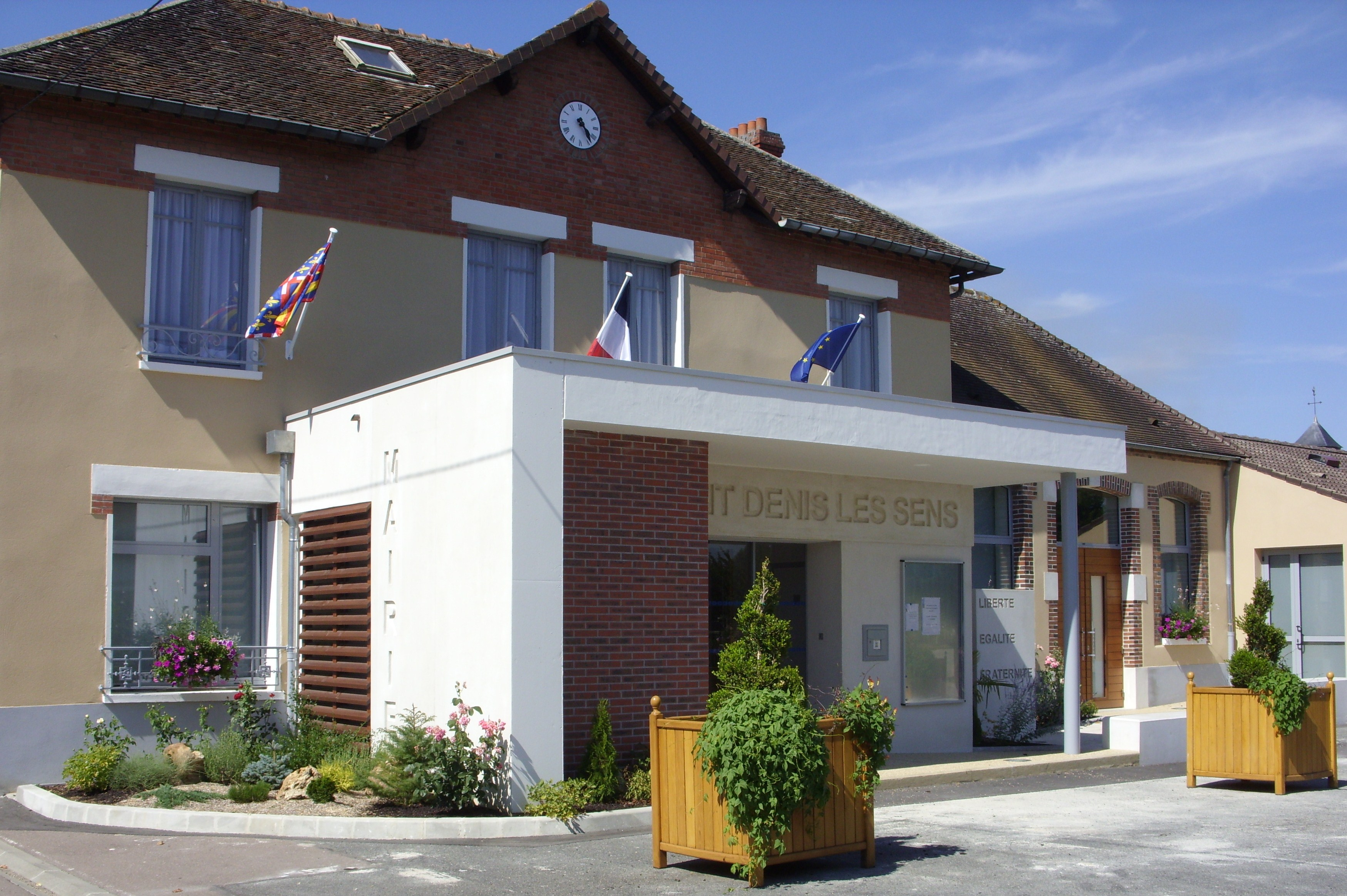
- The town hall in Saint-Denis-lès-Sens
- Location of Saint-Denis-lès-Sens
- Location within France Location within Bourgogne-Franche-Comté
- Coordinates: 48°13′46″N 3°16′02″E
- Country: France
- Region: Bourgogne-Franche-Comté
- Department: Yonne
- Arrondissement: Sens
- Canton: Thorigny-sur-Oreuse
- Intercommunality: CA Grand Sénonais

Government
  - Mayor (2020–2026): Alexandre Bouchier
- Area^{1}: 6.73 km^{2} (2.60 sq mi)
- Highest elevation: 75 m (246 ft)
- Lowest elevation: 61 m (200 ft)
- Population (2023): 628
  - Density: 93.3/km^{2} (242/sq mi)
- Time zone: UTC+01:00 (CET)
  - Summer (DST): UTC+02:00 (CEST)
- INSEE/Postal code: 89342 /89100
- ^{1} French Land Register data, which excludes lakes, ponds, glaciers > 1 km^{2} (0.386 sq mi or 247 acres) and river estuaries.

Saint-Denis-lès-Sens (French pronunciation: [sɛ̃ dəni lɛ sɑ̃s], literally Saint-Denis near Sens), formerly Saint-Denis, is a commune in the Yonne department in Bourgogne-Franche-Comté in north-central France.

== See also ==
- Communes of the Yonne department
