= Compigny =

- Commune
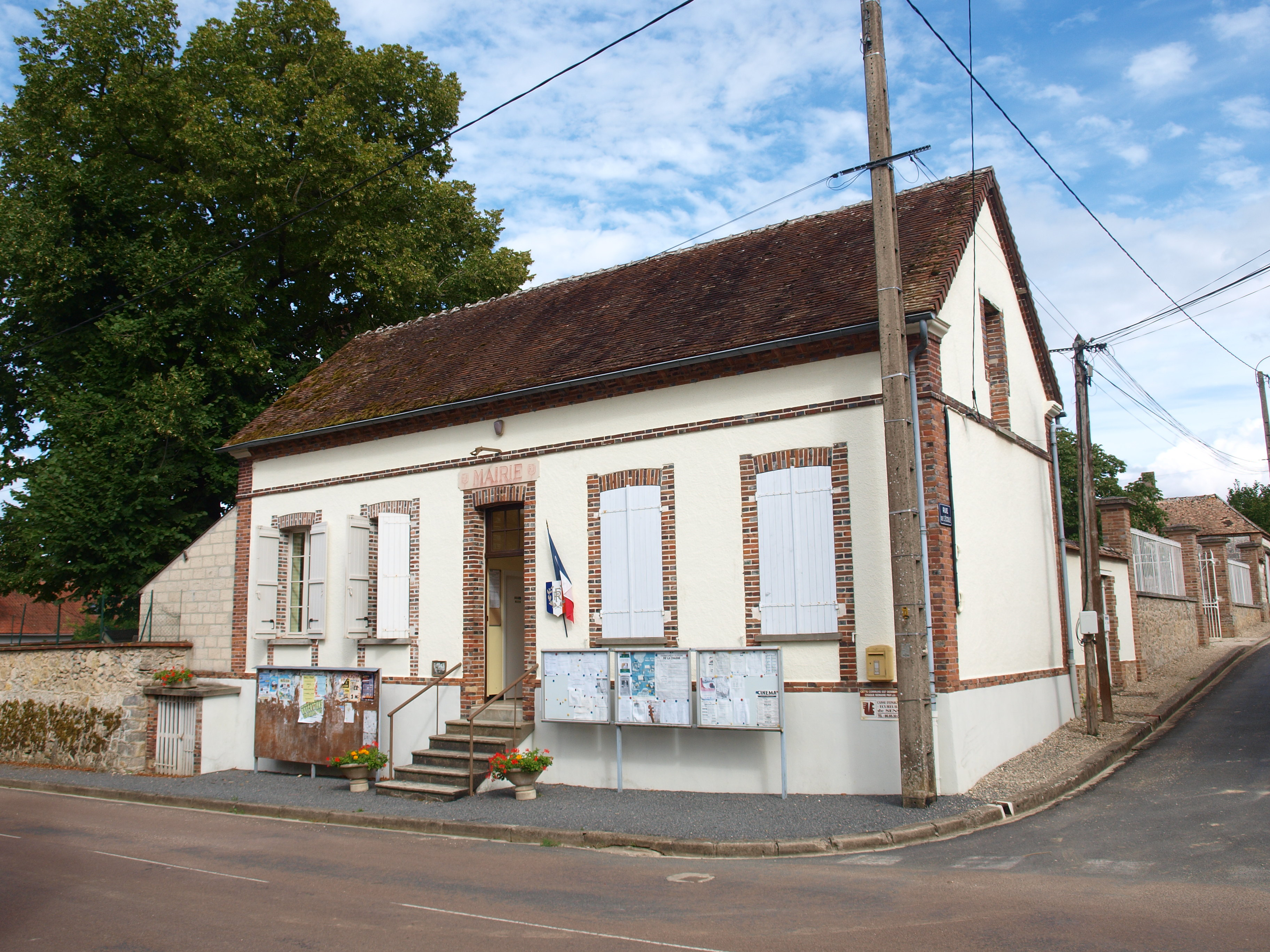
- The town hall in Compigny
- Location of Compigny
- Location within France Location within Bourgogne-Franche-Comté
- Coordinates: 48°21′57″N 3°16′36″E
- Country: France
- Region: Bourgogne-Franche-Comté
- Department: Yonne
- Arrondissement: Sens
- Canton: Thorigny-sur-Oreuse

Government
  - Mayor (2020–2026): Jean-Michel Denisot
- Area^{1}: 7.79 km^{2} (3.01 sq mi)
- Highest elevation: 157 m (515 ft)
- Lowest elevation: 87 m (285 ft)
- Population (2023): 178
  - Density: 22.8/km^{2} (59.2/sq mi)
- Time zone: UTC+01:00 (CET)
  - Summer (DST): UTC+02:00 (CEST)
- INSEE/Postal code: 89115 /89140
- ^{1} French Land Register data, which excludes lakes, ponds, glaciers > 1 km^{2} (0.386 sq mi or 247 acres) and river estuaries.

Compigny (French pronunciation: [kɔ̃piɲi]) is a commune in the Yonne department in Bourgogne-Franche-Comté in north-central France.

== See also ==
- Communes of the Yonne department
