= Raymond Janot =

French politician

Raymond Janot (March 9, 1917, Paris – November 25, 2000, Paris) was a French politician who played a significant role in the writing of the 1958 Constitution of France.

== World War II ==
Janot was with the French forces in World War II in 1939 and was taken prisoner by the German forces in 1940. He succeeded in escaping from the German prison camps in August 1943. Following his escape, Janot became active in the French Resistance, which his wife Catherine was already part of. Catherine assisted downed allied airmen to evade German capture, working with the Comet and Burgundy escape lines and with the BCRA, an intelligence agency associated with Charles de Gaulle. The Janots fled France in April 1944 through the Burgundy network, crossing the Pyrenees into Spain and reaching Algeria. Raymond Janot returned to France as part of the French forces helping to liberate France in the summer of 1944. Catherine became an ambulance driver.

== Politician ==
Following World War II, Janot was appointed as an economic adviser to General de Lattre de Tassigny in French Indochina in 1946. In 1947, Janot became a legal advisor to the President, where he would remain until 1951. Also in 1947, Janot was elected mayor of Serbonnes, where he would remain until 1971, holding this position concurrent with others at a national level, as is not uncommon in France in a practice known as the cumul des mandats.

Janot was heavily involved in the writing of the French Constitution of 1958. He served as the government’s representative in debates, his title being ‘’commissaire du gouvernement’’. This work was done in conjunction with his role as the secretary general of the Conseil d'État. In addition to his other roles, his position as commissaire du gouvernement also resulted in his being named as the secretary-general of the Constitutional Consultative Committee, further increasing his role in the constitutional process, and making him one of the more influential players after Michel Debré. Janot’s influence largely dealt with provisions pertaining to executive power. He largely toed the line of Charles de Gaulle, presenting de Gaulle’s then view relating to the balance of power between president and prime minister. Janot also had strong views against reducing the power of the executive branch, fearing that too strong a parliament would repeat the governmental gridlocks of the Fourth Republic. Some scholars have compared Janot’s opinions on power, especially in the executive branch, to those of Alexander Hamilton, James Madison, and John Jay, the authors of The Federalist Papers, a dialogue on the American constitution. Janot’s defenses of de Gaulle’s position helped to create the stable and powerful French Presidency of the Fifth Republic.

Following the writing of the Constitution, Janot stayed active in French political life. In 1959, he was named as secretary general of the French Community, a forerunner of the modern Francophonie. In March 1960, he was appointed as the Assistant Director-General of Radiodiffusion-Télévision Française, the French public broadcasting company that lasted until 1964. Janot lasted at that post until February 1962 before concentrating on his mayoral duties in Serbonnes.

Late in his career, Janot once again returned to public life He participated in an important conference at Aix-en-Provence in 1988 for the thirtieth anniversary of the French constitution, as the developments of the document were analyzed. He joined the UDF and served as the president of the regional council of Bourgogne from 1989 to 1992. Janot died in 2000. The Catherine and Raymond Janot State Secondary School is named in memory of Janot and his wife.
