= Soucy, Yonne =

Soucy
- Commune
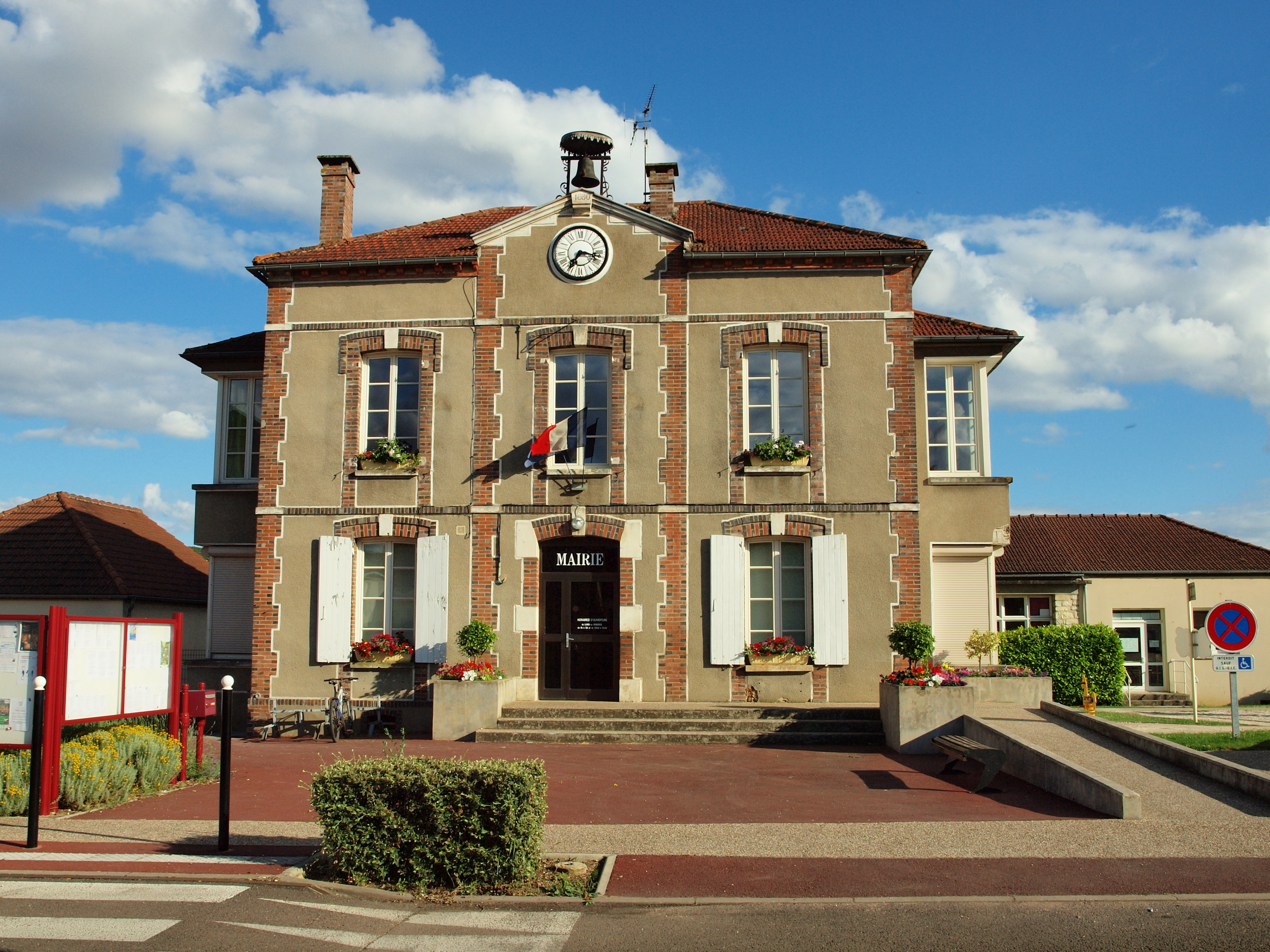
- The town hall in Soucy

- Coat of arms
- Location of Soucy
- Location within France Location within Bourgogne-Franche-Comté
- Coordinates: 48°15′01″N 3°19′30″E
- Country: France
- Region: Bourgogne-Franche-Comté
- Department: Yonne
- Arrondissement: Sens
- Canton: Thorigny-sur-Oreuse
- Intercommunality: CA Grand Sénonais

Government
  - Mayor (2020–2026): Laurence Schoenberger
- Area^{1}: 21.62 km^{2} (8.35 sq mi)
- Highest elevation: 205 m (673 ft)
- Lowest elevation: 68 m (223 ft)
- Population (2023): 1,536
  - Density: 71.05/km^{2} (184.0/sq mi)
- Time zone: UTC+01:00 (CET)
  - Summer (DST): UTC+02:00 (CEST)
- INSEE/Postal code: 89399 /89100
- ^{1} French Land Register data, which excludes lakes, ponds, glaciers > 1 km^{2} (0.386 sq mi or 247 acres) and river estuaries.

Soucy (French pronunciation: [susi]) is a commune in the Yonne department in Bourgogne-Franche-Comté in north-central France.

== See also ==
- Communes of the Yonne department
