= Plessis-Saint-Jean =

- Commune
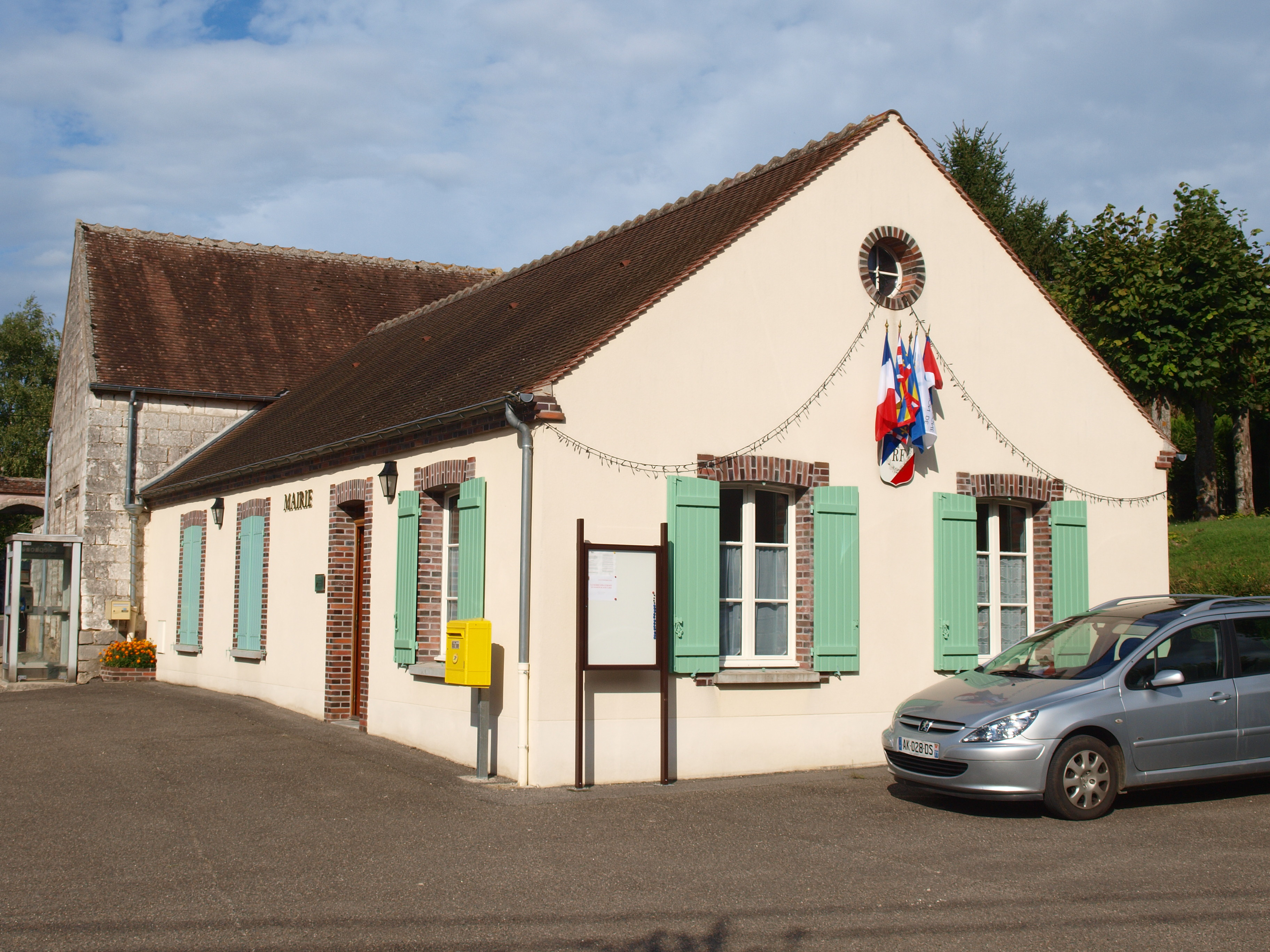
- The town hall in Plessis-Saint-Jean
- Location of Plessis-Saint-Jean
- Location within France Location within Bourgogne-Franche-Comté
- Coordinates: 48°21′11″N 3°18′24″E
- Country: France
- Region: Bourgogne-Franche-Comté
- Department: Yonne
- Arrondissement: Sens
- Canton: Thorigny-sur-Oreuse

Government
  - Mayor (2020–2026): Régine Aubert
- Area^{1}: 11.02 km^{2} (4.25 sq mi)
- Highest elevation: 178 m (584 ft)
- Lowest elevation: 87 m (285 ft)
- Population (2023): 217
  - Density: 19.7/km^{2} (51.0/sq mi)
- Time zone: UTC+01:00 (CET)
  - Summer (DST): UTC+02:00 (CEST)
- INSEE/Postal code: 89302 /89140
- ^{1} French Land Register data, which excludes lakes, ponds, glaciers > 1 km^{2} (0.386 sq mi or 247 acres) and river estuaries.

Plessis-Saint-Jean (French pronunciation: [plɛsi sɛ̃ ʒɑ̃]) is a commune in the Yonne department in Bourgogne-Franche-Comté in north-central France.

== See also ==
- Communes of the Yonne department
