= Voisines, Yonne =

Voisines
- Commune
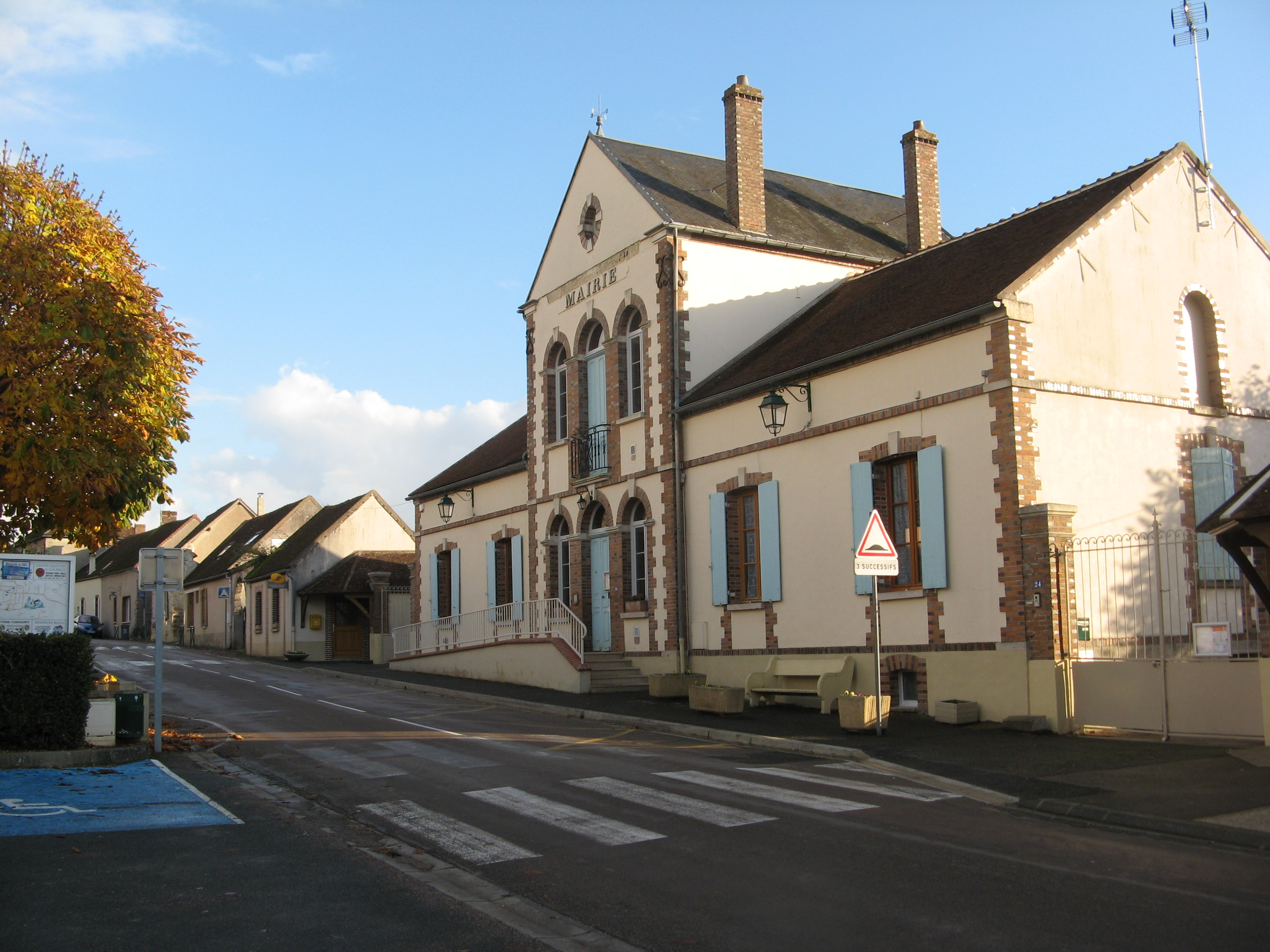
- The town hall in Voisines
- Location of Voisines
- Location within France Location within Bourgogne-Franche-Comté
- Coordinates: 48°15′07″N 3°23′41″E
- Country: France
- Region: Bourgogne-Franche-Comté
- Department: Yonne
- Arrondissement: Sens
- Canton: Thorigny-sur-Oreuse
- Intercommunality: CA Grand Sénonais

Government
  - Mayor (2020–2026): Gérard Ganet
- Area^{1}: 27.12 km^{2} (10.47 sq mi)
- Highest elevation: 230 m (750 ft)
- Lowest elevation: 107 m (351 ft)
- Population (2023): 523
  - Density: 19.3/km^{2} (49.9/sq mi)
- Time zone: UTC+01:00 (CET)
  - Summer (DST): UTC+02:00 (CEST)
- INSEE/Postal code: 89483 /89260
- ^{1} French Land Register data, which excludes lakes, ponds, glaciers > 1 km^{2} (0.386 sq mi or 247 acres) and river estuaries.

Voisines (French pronunciation: [vwazin]) is a commune in the Yonne department in Bourgogne-Franche-Comté in north-central France.

== See also ==
- Communes of the Yonne department
