= Faujasite =

Group of zeolite minerals

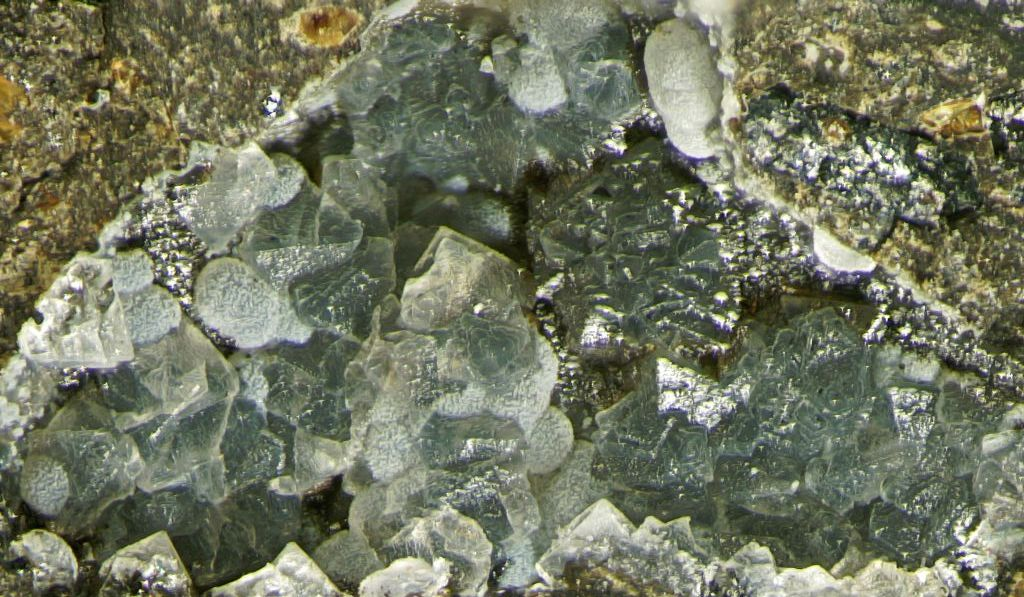

General
- Category: Tectosilicate minerals
- Group: Zeolite group
- Formula: (Na_{2},Ca,Mg)_{3.5}[Al_{7}Si_{17}O_{48}]·32(H_{2}O)
- IMA symbol: Fau
- Strunz classification: 9.GD.30
- Crystal system: Cubic
- Crystal class: Hexoctahedral (m3̅m); H–M Symbol (4/m 3̅ 2/m)
- Space group: Fd3̅m
- Unit cell: a = 24.638–24.65 Å, Z = 32

Identification
- Color: Colorless, white
- Crystal habit: Octahedral or rarely trisoctahedral crystals up to 4 mm in size
- Twinning: on {111}, contact and penetration twins
- Cleavage: {111}, perfect
- Fracture: Uneven to conchoidal
- Tenacity: Brittle
- Mohs scale hardness: 4.5-5
- Luster: Vitreous to adamantine
- Streak: White
- Diaphaneity: Transparent
- Specific gravity: 1.92–1.93
- Optical properties: Isotropic
- Refractive index: n = 1.466–1.480
- Pleochroism: None

Faujasite (FAU-type zeolite) is a mineral group in the zeolite family of silicate minerals. The group consists of faujasite-Na, faujasite-Mg and faujasite-Ca. They all share the same basic formula (Na_{2},Ca,Mg)_{3.5}[Al_{7}Si_{17}O_{48}]·32(H_{2}O) by varying the amounts of sodium, magnesium and calcium. Faujasite occurs as a rare mineral in several locations worldwide.

Faujasite materials are widely synthesized industrially. The relatively low-silica (Si/Al<2) synthetic faujasite is called Zeolite X and the high-silica (Si/Al>2) one is called Zeolite Y. In addition, the aluminum component in zeolite Y can be removed by acid-treatment and/or steam-treatment, and the resulting faujasite is called USY (Ultrastable zeolite Y). USY is used in fluid catalytic cracking process as a catalyst.

== Discovery and occurrence ==
Faujasite was first described in 1842 from an occurrence in the Limberg Quarries, Sasbach, Kaiserstuhl, Baden-Württemberg, Germany. The sodium modifier faujasite-Na was added following the discovery of the magnesium and calcium rich phases in the 1990s. It was named for Barthélemy Faujas de Saint-Fond (1741–1819), French geologist and volcanologist.

Faujasite occurs in vesicles within basalt and phonolite lava and tuff as an alteration or authigenic mineral. It occurs with other zeolites, olivine, augite and nepheline.

== Structure ==
The structure of the faujasite framework

Structure of aluminosilicate cage in faujasite. Vertices are occupied by aluminium or silicium atoms, the connecting struts are occupied by oxygen atoms.

The faujasite framework has been attributed the code FAU by the International Zeolite Association. It consists of sodalite cages which are connected through hexagonal prisms. The pore, which is formed by a 12-membered ring, has a relatively large diameter of 7.4 Å. The inner cavity has a diameter of 12 Å and is surrounded by 10 sodalite cages. The unit cell is cubic; Pearson symbol cF576, symmetry Fd3̅m, No. 227, lattice constant 24.7 Å. Of the two types (X and Y) of zeolites coded with FAU, zeolite Y, which is the one with the higher range of silica-to-alumina content, has a void fraction of 48% and a Si/Al ratio of 2.43. It thermally decomposes at 793 °C.

== Synthesis ==
Faujasite is synthesized, as are other zeolites, from alumina sources such as sodium aluminate and silica sources such as sodium silicate. Other aluminosilicates such as kaolin are used as well. The ingredients are dissolved in a basic environment such as sodium hydroxide aqueous solution and crystallized at 70 to 300 °C (usually at 100 °C). After crystallization the faujasite is in its sodium form and must be ion exchanged with ammonium to improve stability. The ammonium ion is removed later by calcination which renders the zeolite in its acid form. Depending on the silica-to-alumina ratio of their framework, synthetic faujasite zeolites are divided into X and Y zeolites. In X zeolites that ratio is between 2 and 3, while in Y zeolites it is 3 or higher. The negative charges of the framework are balanced by the positive charges of cations (usually either sodium from the NaOH solution, or ammonium or H^{+} after exchanges) in non-framework positions. Such zeolites have ion-exchange, catalytic and adsorptive properties. The stability of the zeolite increases with the silica-to-alumina ratio of the framework (Lowenstein's rule). It is also affected by the type and amount of cations located in non-framework positions. For catalytic cracking, the Y zeolite is often used in a rare earth-hydrogen exchanged form.

By using thermal, hydrothermal or chemical methods, some of the alumina can be removed from the Y zeolite framework, resulting in high-silica Y zeolites. Such zeolites are used in cracking and hydrocracking catalysts. Complete dealumination results in faujasite-silica.

== Use ==
Faujasite is used above all as a catalyst in fluid catalytic cracking to convert high-boiling fractions of petroleum crude to more valuable gasoline, diesel and other products. Zeolite Y has superseded zeolite X in this use because it is both more active and more stable at high temperatures due to the higher Si/Al ratio. It is also used in the hydrocracking units as a platinum/palladium support to increase aromatic content of reformulated refinery products.

Type X zeolite can be used to selectively adsorb CO_{2} from gas streams and is used in the prepurification of air for industrial air separation.

Due to its widely known structure, behaviour and properties, Faujasite is often used as a standard in catalytic and (ad/de)sorption studies on zeolites, along with MFI, FER and CHA

== See also ==
- Cu Y Zeolite, copper-containing high-silica derivatives of the faujasite mineral group

== Literature ==
- Subhash Bhatia, Zeolite Catalysis: Principles and Applications, CRC Press, Inc., Boca Raton, Florida, 1990.
- Ribeiro, F. R., et al., ed., Zeolites: Science and Technology, Martinus Nijhoff Publishers, The Hague, 1984.
