= Serbonnes =

- Commune
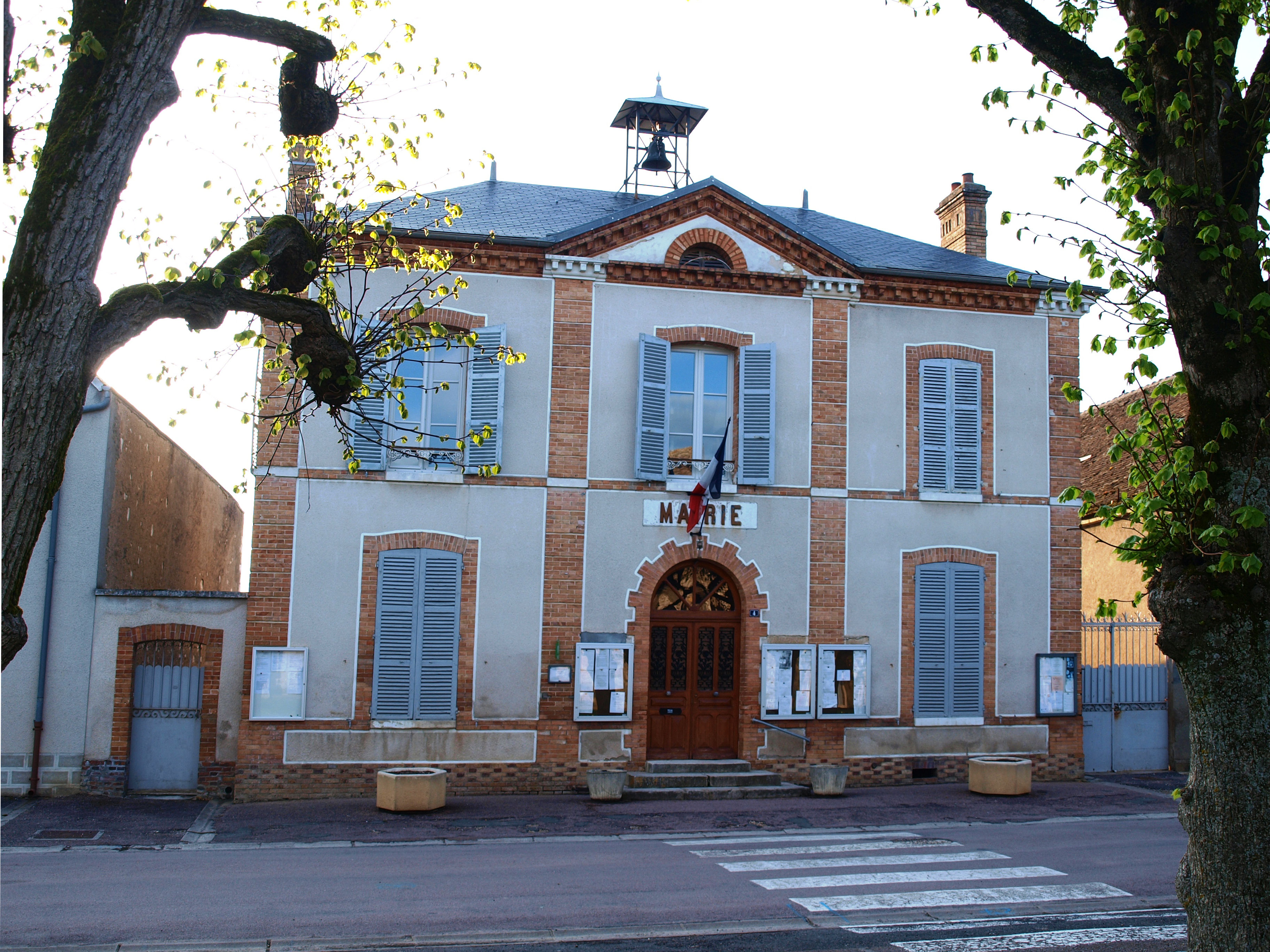
- The town hall in Serbonnes
- Location of Serbonnes
- Location within France Location within Bourgogne-Franche-Comté
- Coordinates: 48°19′18″N 3°12′19″E
- Country: France
- Region: Bourgogne-Franche-Comté
- Department: Yonne
- Arrondissement: Sens
- Canton: Thorigny-sur-Oreuse

Government
  - Mayor (2020–2026): Olivier Martin
- Area^{1}: 9.93 km^{2} (3.83 sq mi)
- Elevation: 75 m (246 ft)
- Highest elevation: 145 m (476 ft)
- Lowest elevation: 57 m (187 ft)
- Population (2023): 716
  - Density: 72.1/km^{2} (187/sq mi)
- Time zone: UTC+01:00 (CET)
  - Summer (DST): UTC+02:00 (CEST)
- INSEE/Postal code: 89390 /89140
- ^{1} French Land Register data, which excludes lakes, ponds, glaciers > 1 km^{2} (0.386 sq mi or 247 acres) and river estuaries.

Serbonnes (French pronunciation: [sɛʁbɔn]) is a commune in the Yonne department in Bourgogne-Franche-Comté in north-central France.

== Personalities ==
Raymond Janot, a national French political figure, was mayor of Serbonnes from 1947 to 1971.

== Demography ==
Historical population
Year	Pop.	±% p.a.
1968	282	—
1975	269	−0.67%
1982	273	+0.21%
1990	383	+4.32%
1999	454	+1.91%
2007	529	+1.93%
2012	578	+1.79%
2017	626	+1.61%
2023	716	+2.26%
Source: INSEE

== See also ==
- Communes of the Yonne department
