= Cuy, Yonne =

Cuy
- Commune
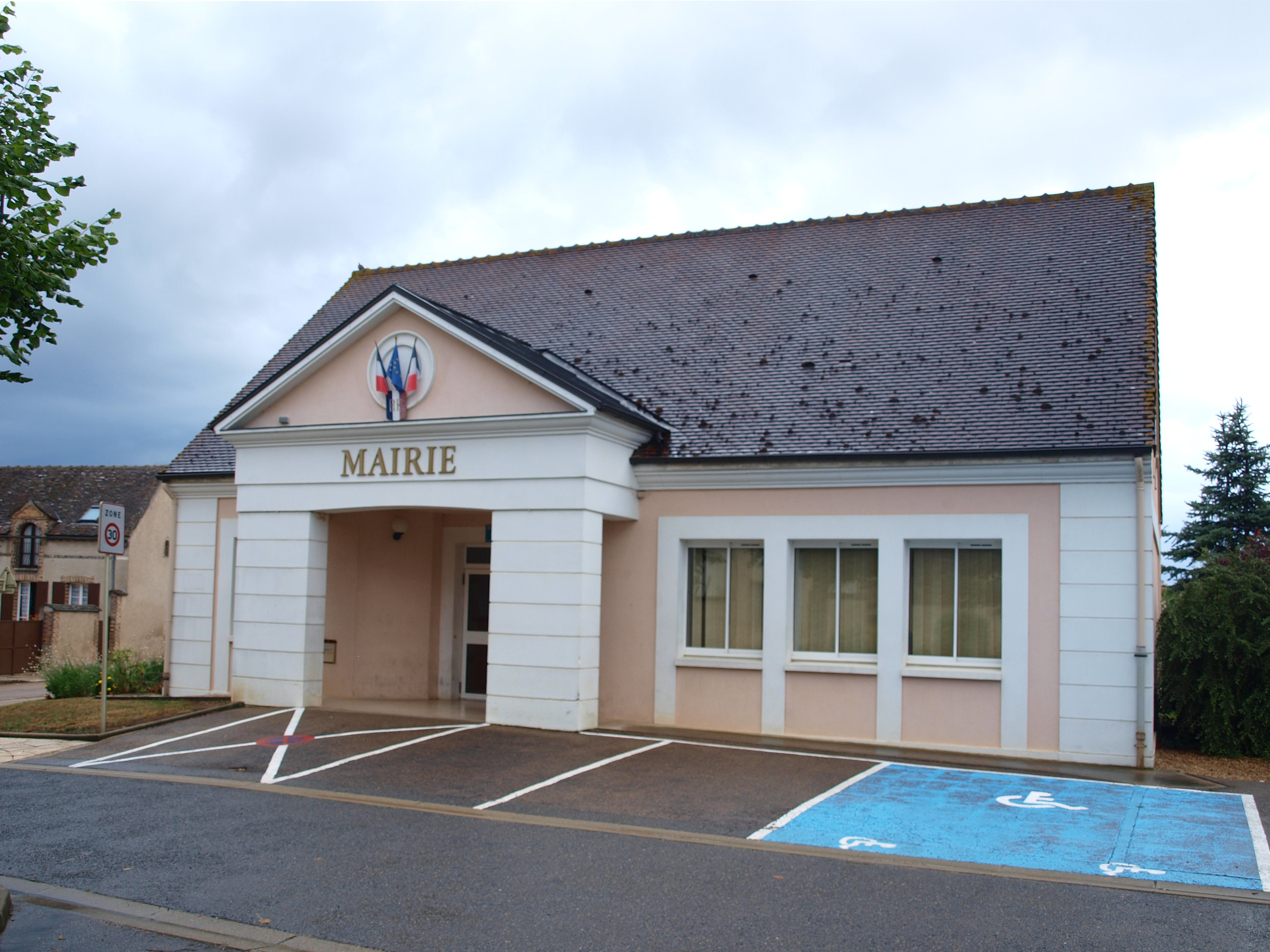
- The town hall in Cuy
- Location of Cuy
- Location within France Location within Bourgogne-Franche-Comté
- Coordinates: 48°15′30″N 3°15′56″E
- Country: France
- Region: Bourgogne-Franche-Comté
- Department: Yonne
- Arrondissement: Sens
- Canton: Thorigny-sur-Oreuse

Government
  - Mayor (2020–2026): François Sylvestre
- Area^{1}: 6.97 km^{2} (2.69 sq mi)
- Highest elevation: 128 m (420 ft)
- Lowest elevation: 61 m (200 ft)
- Population (2023): 861
  - Density: 124/km^{2} (320/sq mi)
- Time zone: UTC+01:00 (CET)
  - Summer (DST): UTC+02:00 (CEST)
- INSEE/Postal code: 89136 /89140
- ^{1} French Land Register data, which excludes lakes, ponds, glaciers > 1 km^{2} (0.386 sq mi or 247 acres) and river estuaries.

Cuy (French pronunciation: [kɥi]) is a commune in the Yonne department in Bourgogne-Franche-Comté in north-central France.

== See also ==
- Communes of the Yonne department
