= Cuyahoga =

Cuyahoga may refer to:

== Places ==
- Cuyahoga County, Ohio
- Cuyahoga Falls, Ohio
- Cuyahoga Heights, Ohio
- Cuyahoga River, northeast Ohio
- Cuyahoga Valley National Park, Ohio
- Cuyhoga Creek, a stream in Missouri

== Ships ==
- USCGC Cuyahoga (WIX-157), a U.S. Coast Guard Cutter that sank in the Chesapeake Bay in 1978 after a collision
- USS Cuyahoga (AG-26), built in 1927 and transferred from the United States Coast Guard to the Navy in 1933
- Cuyahoga (ship, 1943), a Maritimer, built to the design of the United States Maritime Commission, see Lower Lakes Towing

== Song ==
- "Cuyahoga" (song), a song by R.E.M. on their 1986 album Lifes Rich Pageant
