= Cu Y Zeolite =

Cu-Y zeolites (CuY, CuFAU, copper faujasite) are copper-containing high-silica derivatives of the faujasite mineral group which in turn is a member of the zeolite family. Cu-Y zeolites are synthesized through aqueous or gaseous ionic exchange unlike the naturally occurring faujasites: faujasite-Ca, faujasite-Mg, and faujasite-Na. The exchanged copper atom can vary in oxidation states, but the most studied Cu-Y zeolite variants include Cu(I) or Cu(II) cations. Due to their high catalytic potential, they are utilized as desulfurization agents and in the production of nitrogen gas from nitrogen monoxide.

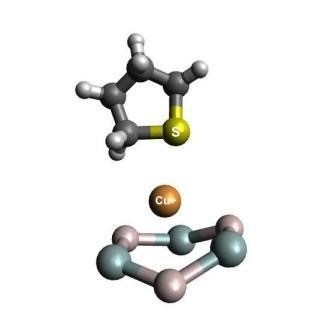
Copper cation housed within faujasite six-ring window site interacting with thiophene compound.

== History ==
Copper based type Y zeolites were first described as a means of hydrocracking in a patent filed in 1963, and were soon implemented in industrial hydrocracking processes. They eventually began to find use in other industries as the usage of zeolites increased as a whole, such as removal of carbon monoxide from gas. In 1972, a patent was filed describing the production of Cu-Y zeolites from sodium-based zeolites, helping to further spread its use in the industry. The first documented use of Cu-Y zeolites for desulfurization was in 1977, in which a variety of zeolites including the Cu-Y variant were used to remove hydrogen sulfide from gases. From then on, various methods were developed utilizing Cu-Y zeolites in desulfurization of hydrocarbons, reducing their environmental impact when used as fuel.

== Properties ==
Many experiments have been done to understand the properties of Cu-Y zeolites. The zeolite can act as a catalyst, Brønsted acid, as well as an oxidizing agent. One of the important properties allowing zeolites to act as catalysts is their ability to exchange cations without disturbing the crystalline structure. Cu-Y zeolites have been shown to catalyze the ethylation of benzene due to their acidic properties. The acidity of these zeolites was determined by infrared spectroscopic studies and comparing the vibrational frequencies of the hydroxyl groups since their Brønsted acidity comes from the hydroxyl groups attached to it. The hydroxyl groups that are more accessible exhibit more acidic properties while the oxygens in the hexagonal prism are less acidic. Copper zeolites also act as oxidizing agents as seen in their ability to ionize anthracene, the electron transfer was proven to happen at the cupric ion.

== Reaction mechanisms ==
Possible mechanisms of CuY-zeolite are based on the type of substrate. These mechanisms include π complexation and acid catalysis.

1. π Complexation The empty s-orbital of cationic copper forms a sigma bond with incoming sulfur and d-orbitals donate electron density to anti-bonding orbitals of sulfur rings. This mechanism is consistent in that pi complexation involves stronger bonds with organo-sulfur molecules than with aromatic sulfur.

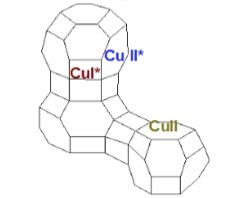
Copper bonding and reduction sites within a zeolite cage.

2. Acid Catalysis Although this mechanism is restricted to HY-ZSM5 zeolite, experiments involving thiophene adsorption have noted saturation uptakes of thiophene to Cu(I) in CuY-zeolite. Adsorption of thiophene then, could be due to a number of acid sites in the CuY-zeolite, specifically Cu(I)Y-zeolite reduced by H+ as compared to HY-zeolite in other studies, which is known to saturate thiophenes specifically.

== Applications ==
The two most common applications of the Cu(I) Y Zeolite are catalytic decomposition of nitrous oxide to nitrogen and oxygen, and desulfurization of fuels used in the hydrocracking process for petroleum production.

The decomposition of nitrous oxide and reducing the emissions into the atmosphere is important to protect the environment. Nitrous oxide reacts with ozone to create nitric oxide, thereby contributing in the destruction of the ozone. Therefore, it must be decomposed into its elements, nitrogen and oxygen, which are inert components of air. The zeolite is used because it uniquely positions the necessary active sites for the decomposition. However, Cu(I) Y zeolite is not the most efficient copper exchanged catalyst used for this purpose. Research shows the Cu-ZSM-5 has higher catalytic activity even though the Y zeolite has a larger pore size and higher copper loading.

Within gasoline and diesel, the government requires sulfur levels to be reduced from 300 – 500 ppm to 30 ppm and 15 ppm respectively. For fuel cell applications sulfur must be under 1 ppm to avoid poisoning the fuel cell. Cu(I) Y zeolite catalyst is typically used to reduce the sulfur in both situations. The hydrodesulfurization technique can remove thiols and sulfides, but cannot efficiently remove thiophenes, therefore the catalyst is used because it selectively adsorbs the sulfur compounds at ambient temperature and pressure. They selectively bind to the thiophenic compounds by pi complexation. The pi complexation involves the donation of electron charges from the thiophene pi-orbital to the vacant s orbital of the copper. At the same time, the d-orbitals of the metals donate electron charges to the anti-bonding pi-orbital. This donation to the s orbital of copper is important in adsorbing thiophene. The downfall of using the Cu(I) Y zeolite catalyst for desulfurization is that moisture exhibits strong inhibiting effects on the adsorption process because the water molecule is preferred over sulfur.

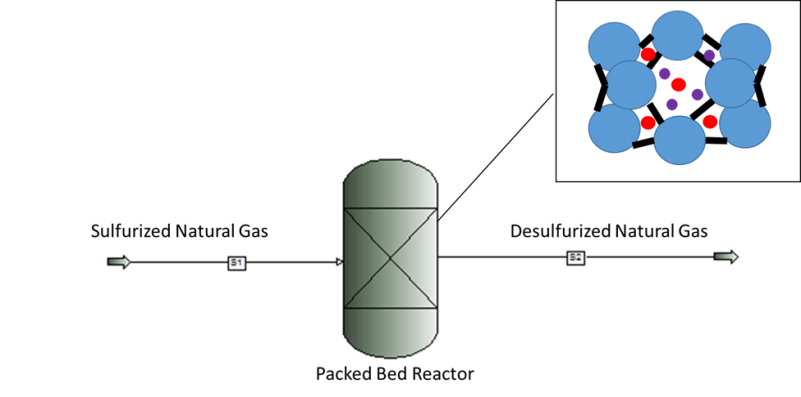
This is part of the typical process for desulfurization of natural gas where the catalyst is within the packed bed reactor. The blue molecules represent the catalyst caging in the sulfur molecules (orange) and water molecules (purple) who compete for the active sites.

== See also ==
- Faujasite
- Zeolite
