= List of knights of the Order of the Holy Spirit =

Collar of the commanders (prelates) of the Order of the Holy Spirit

Collar of the Chevaliers of the Order of the Holy Spirit

The list of the knights of the Order of the Holy Spirit presents the chronological list of knights and commanders of the most important French Order of the Holy Spirit, established by Henry III (1578), abolished under the French Revolution (1791), re-established under the Restoration (1814), abolished in turn by the July Monarchy (1830).

== Under Henry III ==
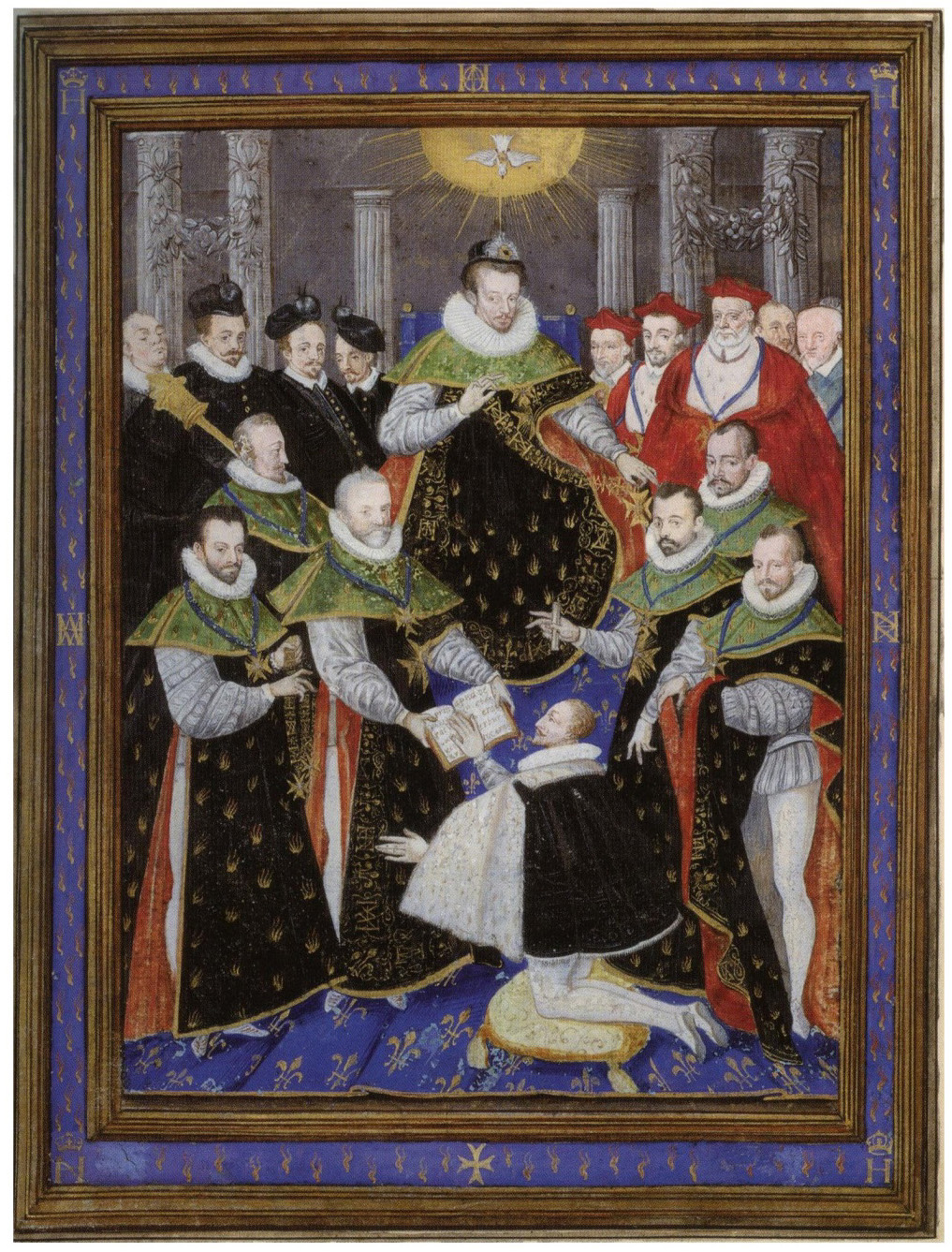
Henri III presiding the first ceremony of the Order of the Holy Spirit on 31 December 1578 : reception of Louis Gonzaga, Duke of Nevers, anonymous, Musée du Louvre.

Henry III was the founder of the order, First sovereign chief of the order.

=== First promotion (31 December 1578) ===
- Prelates received on 31 December, in the Church of the Grands-Augustins, in Paris :
  - Charles, Cardinal de Bourbon, prince du sang, cardinal (1548), former bishop of Nantes (1550–1554), archbishop of Rouen (1550-1590), Papal legate in Avignon (1565–1590) then bishop-count of Beauvais (1569–1575) and peer of France.
  - Louis de Lorraine, Cardinal of Guise, archbishop of Reims.
  - René de Birague, Chancellor of France (1573), cardinal (1578), bishop of Lodève (1573 - 1580), later bishop of Lavaur (1582-1583).
  - Philippe de Lenoncourt, former bishop of Châlons, bishop of Auxerre (1560–62) and bishop emeritus of Auxerre (1562–92), cardinal (1586), peer of France.
  - Pierre de Gondi, cardinal, bishop of Paris.
  - Charles de Perusse des Cars, Duke and bishop of Langres.
  - René de Daillon du Lude, Abbot of Notre-Dame-des-Châteliers, former bishop of Luçon (1553-1562), later bishop of Bayeux (1590–1600).
  - Jacques Amyot, bishop of Auxerre and Grand Almoner of France.
- Knights received on the same day :
  - Louis IV Gonzaga, prince of Mantoue, Duke of Nevers, Peer of France.
  - Philippe Emmanuel de Lorraine, Duke of Mercœur, Peer of France.
  - Jacques II de Crussol, Duke of Uzès, Peer of France.
  - Charles de Lorraine, Duke of Aumale, Peer of France.
  - Honorat II of Savoy, marquess de Villars, marshal of France and admiral of France
  - Artus de Cossé-Brissac, Marshal of France and Grand Panetier of France.
  - François Gouffier, Lord of Crèvecoeur and Bonnivet.
  - François de Pérusse des Cars, Count of Escars.
  - Charles de Hallwin, Lord of Piennes, Marquess of Meignelais, later Duke of Halluin and Peer of France.
  - Charles de La Rochefoucauld, Lord of Barbézieux.
  - Jean d'Escars, prince of Carency.
  - Christophe Juvénal des Ursins, Marquess of Trainel.
  - François Le Roy de la Baussonnière, Count of Clinchamp, lieutenant of the lands of Anjou, Touraine and Maine.
  - Scipion de Fiesque, Count of Lavagne, Honorary Knight of Queen Catherine de' Medici.
  - Antoine, sire de Pons, comte de Marennes, captain of the 100 Gentlemen of la maison du Roi.
  - Jacques d'Humières sieur de Monchy, marquis d'Ancre, governor of Péronne.
  - Jean VI d'Aumont, comte de Châteauroux, marshal of France.
  - Jean de Chourses, seigneur de Malicorne, governor of Poitou.
  - Albert de Gondi, comte, then duc de Retz, marshal of France and général of the galleys.
  - René de Villequier, governor of Paris and Isle de France.
  - Jean Blosset, baron de Torcy, governor of Paris and Isle de France.
  - Claude de Villequier, vicomte de la Guerche.
  - Antoine d'Estrées, marquis de Cœuvres, Grand master of the Artillery of France.
  - Charles-Robert de La Marck, comte de Braine and Maulévrier, captain of the Swiss Guards.
  - François de Balsac, seigneur d'Entragues, governor of Orléans.
  - Philibert de La Guiche, seigneur de Chaumont, Grand master of the Artillery of France.
  - Philippe Strozzi, colonel-général of the French Infantry.

=== Second promotion (21 December 1579) ===
- Knights received on 31 December, in the Church of the Grands-Augustins, in Paris.
  - François de Bourbon, prince de Conti.
  - François de Bourbon, prince dauphin d'Auvergne, duc de Saint-Fargeau, then of Montpensier, pair de France.
  - Henri I de Lorraine, duc de Guise, Grand Master of France.
  - Louis de Saint-Gelais, seigneur de Lanssac, chevalier d'honneur of Queen Catherine de Médicis.
  - Jean Ébrard, Seigneur de Saint-Sulpice.
  - Jacques II de Goyon, seigneur de Matignon, comte de Torigny, marshal of France.
  - Bertrand de Salignac, seigneur de la Mothe-Fénelon, ambassador to England.

=== Third promotion (21 December 1580) ===
- Knights received on 31 December, in the Church of Saint-Sauveur de Blois.
  - François de Luxembourg, Duke of Piney-Luxembourg, prince de Tingry, pair de France, ambassador in Rome
  - Charles de Birague, State councilor.
  - Jean de Léaumont, seigneur de Puygaillard, Marshal General of France.
  - René de Rochechouart, baron de Mortemar and seigneur de Lussac.
  - Henri de Lénoncourt, private councilor to the King, maréchal de camp.
  - Nicolas d'Angennes, seigneur de Rambouillet, vidame du Mans, captain of the Life Guards of King Charles IX, ambassador in Germany and Rome.

=== Fourth promotion (21 December 1581) ===
- Knights received on 31 December, in the Church of the Grands-Augustins, in Paris :
  - Charles I de Lorraine, duc d'Elbeuf, Grand Squire of France, Grand Huntsman and pair of France.
  - Armand de Gontaut-Biron, marshal of France.
  - Guy de Daillon, comte du Lude, governor of Poitou and sénéchal of Rouergue.
  - François de La Baume, comte de Suze, governor of Provence.
  - Antoine de Levis, comte de Quélus, governor of Rouergue.
  - Jean de Thévalle, seigneur d'Aviré and Bouillé, governor of Metz.
  - Louis d'Angennes, baron de Meslay, seigneur de Maintenon, grand-marshal of the King's chambers.

=== Fifth promotion (21 December 1582) ===
- Knights received on 31 December, in the Church of the Grands-Augustins, in Paris :
  - Charles de Lorraine, duc de Mayenne, admiral and Grand Chamberlain of France.
  - Anne de Joyeuse, pair and admiral de France.
  - Jean Louis de Nogaret de La Valette, duc d'Epernon, colonel-général of the French Infantry.
  - Tanneguy le Veneur, comte de Tillières, lieutenant général in Normandie.
  - Jean de Moy, seigneur de la Meilleraye, vice-admiral of France, lieutenant général in Normandie.
  - Philippe de Volvire, marquis de Ruffec, governor of Angoumois.
  - François de Mandelot, vicomte de Châlons, governor of Lyonnais.
  - Tristan de Rostaing, baron de la Guerche, Grand-master of the waters and forests of France.
  - Jean-Jacques de Susanne, comte de Cerny.

=== Sixth promotion (21 December 1583) ===
- Prelate received on 31 December, in the Church of the Grands-Augustins, in Paris :
  - Charles de Lorraine, cardinal de Vaudemont, bishop and count of Toul.
- Knights received on the same day :
  - Honorat de Bueil, seigneur de Fontaines, vice-admiral of France, lieutenant général in Bretagne.
  - René de Rochefort, baron de Frôlois, governor of Blésois.
  - Jean de Vivonne, marquis de Pisany, sénéchal of Saintonge.
  - Louis Chasteigner, seigneur de la Rocheposay, governor of la Marche.
  - Bernard de Nogaret, seigneur de la Valette, then Admiral of France.
  - Henri de Joyeuse, comte du Bouchage, then duc de Joyeuse, pair and marshal of France.
  - Nicolas de Grimonville, seigneur de Larchant, captain of the 100 Archers of the King's Guard.
  - Louis d'Amboise, comte d'Aubijoux.
  - François de La Valette, seigneur de Cornusson, governor and sénéchal of Toulouse.
  - François de Cazillac, baron de Cessac.
  - Joachim de Dinteville, lieutenant général of the government of Champagne.
  - Joachim de Châteauvieux, comte de Confolant, honorary Knight of Queen Marie de Médicis.
  - Charles de Balsac, seigneur de Clermont d'Entragues.
  - Charles du Plessis, seigneur de Liancourt, then marquis de Guercheville and comte de Beaumont-sur-Oise, governor of Paris.
  - François de Chabanes, marquis de Curton, lieutenant général in Auvergne.
  - Robert de Combault, first master of the King's chambers.
  - François, seigneur de Sénectaire (or Saint-Nectaire) and la Ferté-Nabert.

=== Seventh promotion (21 December 1584) ===
- Knights received on 31 December, in the Church of the Grands-Augustins, in Paris :
  - Jean de Saint-Larry, baron de Termes, maréchal de camp and governor of Metz.
  - Jean de Vienne, baron de Ruffey, governor of Bourbonnais.
  - Louis de Castellanne, named Adhémar de Monteil, comte de Grignan, lieutenant général in Provence.

=== Eighth promotion (21 December 1585) ===
- Knights received on 31 December, in the Church of the Grands-Augustins, in Paris :
  - Charles de Bourbon, comte de Soissons pair and grand-master of France.
  - Jean, seigneur de Vassé, baron de la Roche-Mabille.
  - Adrien Tiercelin, seigneur de Brosse and Sarcus, then lieutenant général in Champagne.
  - François Chabot, marquis de Mirebeau, comte de Charny.
  - Gilles de Souvré, marquis de Courtenvaux, marshal of France.
  - François d'O, seigneur de Fresnes, first gentleman of the King's chamber, Superintendent of Finances, governor of Paris and Isle de France.
  - Claude de La Châtre, baron de la Maisonfort, then marshal of France.
  - Giraud de Mauléon, seigneur de Gourdan, governor of Calais.
  - Jacques de Loubens, seigneur de Verdalle.
  - Louis de Berton, seigneur de Crillon, named le Brave, mestre de camp of the Guards' regiment.
  - Jean d'Angennes, seigneur de Poigny, ambassador in Savoy and Vienna.
  - François de La Jugie du Puy-Duval, seigneur and baron de Rieux, governor of Narbonne.
  - François-Louis d'Agoût de Montauban, comte de Sault.
  - Guillaume de Saulx, vicomte de Tavannes, lieutenant général in Bourgogne.
  - Meri de Barbezières, seigneur de la Roche-Chémeraut, grand-marshal of the King's chambers.
  - François du Plessis, father of the cardinal, grand-provost and captain of the Life Guards.
  - Gabriel Nompar de Caumont, comte de Lauzun.
  - Hector de Pardaillan, seigneur de Montespan and Gondrin.
  - Louis de Champagne, comte de la Suze au Maine.
  - René de Bouillé, comte de Crancé, governor of Périgueux.
  - Louis Du Bois, seigneur des Arpentis, governor of Touraine.
  - Jean d'O, seigneur de Manou, captain of the 100 Archers of the King's Guard.
  - Henri de Silly, comte de La Rocheguyon, damoiseau de Commercy.
  - Antoine de Bauffremont, named de Vienne, marquis d'Arc en Barrois.
  - Jean du Chastelet, seigneur de Thon, governor of Langres.
  - François d'Escoubleau, seigneur de Sourdis, then marquis d'Alluye, first squire of the great stable.
  - Charles d'Ongnies, comte de Chaulnes.
  - David Bouchard, vicomte d'Aubeterre, governor of Périgord.

=== Ninth promotion (21 December 1586) ===
- Knights received on 31 December, in the Church of the Grands-Augustins, in Paris :
  - Georges de Villequier, vicomte de la Guierche.
  - Jacques de Mouy, seigneur de Pierrecourt, state councilor.
  - Charles de Vivonne, seigneur de la Chasteigneraye, sénéchal of Saintonge.
  - Jacques le Veneur, comte de Tillières, lieutenant général of Haute-Normandie.

=== Tenth promotion (21 December 1587) ===
- Prelate received on 31 December 1587 :
  - François de Foix-Candale, bishop of Aire.

=== During the reign of Henry III, Knights and commanders appointed without having been received ===
Several eminent personages were appointed Knight or Commander of the Order of the Holy Spirit during the reign of Henry III, without having been received, and therefore they cannot be counted as members of the order. However, as proof of their appointments exists either in the archives of the order itself, or in the genealogies of the great officers of the crown, it seemed necessary to recall their names.

==== Year 1578 ====
- Prelate :
  - Louis, cardinal d'Este, named commander on 31 December.
- Knights :
  - François de France, duc d'Alençon.
  - Louis II de Bourbon duc de Montpensier.
  - Jacques de Savoie, duc de Nemours.
  - François de Montmorency, duc de Montmorency, pair de France, Marshal of France and Grand Master of France.
  - Léonor Chabot, Grand Écuyer of France.
  - Guillaume II, vicomte de Joyeuse, lieutenant général of the government of Languedoc, Marshal of France.
  - Laurent de Maugiron, lieutenant général of the Dauphiné.
  - René de Tournemine, baron de La Hunaudaye.
  - Gaspard de Montmorin, seigneur de Saint-Hérem.
  - Jean de Losse, governor of Verdun.
  - Claude Motier de la Fayette, seigneur de Hautefeuille.
  - Gilbert III de Lévis, comte de Ventadour, governor of Limousin and then of Lyonnais, pair de France.

==== Year 1580 ====
- Knights :
  - Charles de Vendôme de Rubempré, governor of Rue.
  - Jean de Pontevés, baron de Cotignac, grand sénéchal and admiral of Provence.
  - Jean de Rieux, marquis d'Asserac.

==== Year 1582 ====
- Knight:
  - Charles de Belleville, comte de Cosnac, lieutenant général in Saintonge.

==== Year 1584 ====
- Knights:
  - Jean Louis de La Rochefoucauld, comte de Randan.
  - Charles de Mouy, seigneur de la Meilleraye, vice-admiral of France.

==== Year 1585 ====
- Knights:
  - Michel de Castelnau, seigneur de Mauvissère, ambassador in England, governor of Saint-Dizier.
  - Hector Renaud de Durfort, comte Launac.
  - François de Brailly, seigneur de Mainvilliers.

==== Year 1587 ====
- Knight:
  - Christophe, baron de Bassompierre.

==== Year 1588 ====
- Commander :
  - François de Joyeuse, archbishop of Narbonne, cardinal.
- Knights :
  - Philippe d'Angennes, seigneur de Fargis, governor of Maine.
  - René du Bellay, prince d'Yvetot.
  - Artus de Maillé, seigneur de Brézé, governor of Anjou.

== Under Henri IV ==
Henri IV, second sovereign head of the order, did not receive the collar until his coronation, 28 February 1594, and during this interval made the most senior chevalier to preside in his place (it was Marshal de Biron, the father, who presided in the absence of the king).

=== First promotion (31 December 1591) ===
- Prelate received in the Mantes church :
  - Renaud de Beaune, archbishop of Bourges, then of Sens, Grand Almoner of France.
- Knight :
  - Charles de Gontaut, baron de Biron, Marshal General of France, then duc de Biron, pair and Marshal of France.

=== Second promotion (7 December 1595) ===
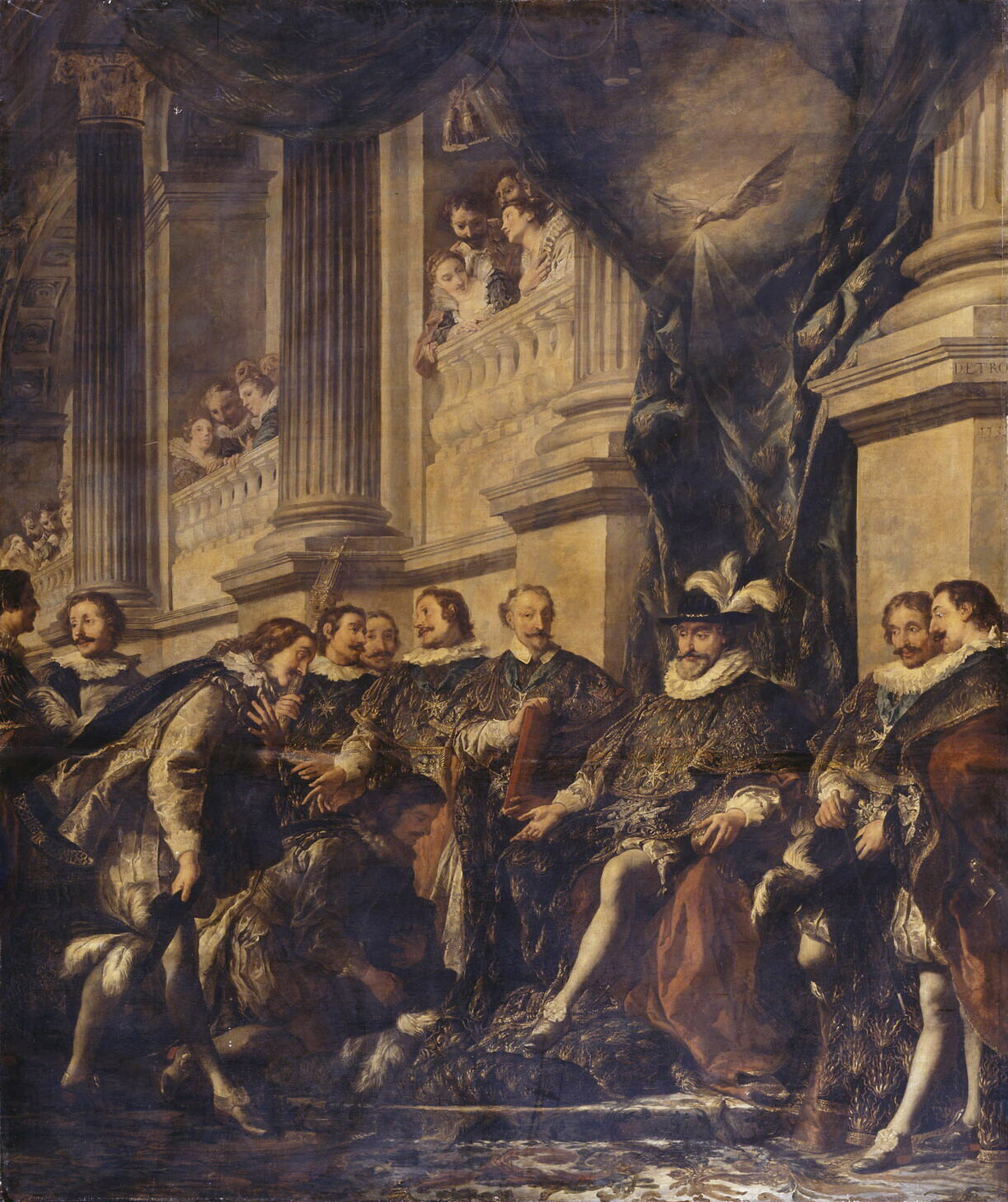
First promotion of the Order of the Holy Spirit held by Henry IV in the church of the Grands-Augustins Monastery in Paris (1595), Jean-François de Troy, 1732, Musée du Louvre.

- Prelates received in the Grands-Augustins church in Paris :
  - Philippe du Bec, archbishop and duc de Reims.
  - Henri I d'Escoubleau de Sourdis, bishop of Maillezais.
- Knights :
  - Henri de Bourbon, duc de Montpensier, pair de France, governor of Normandy.
  - Henri d'Orléans, duc de Longueville.
  - François d'Orléans, comte de Saint-Pol, then duc de Fronsac.
  - Antoine de Brichanteau, marquis de Nangis, colonel of the regiment of the French Guards, admiral of France, ambassador.
  - Jean de Beaumanoir, marquis de Lavardin, then Marshal of France.
  - François d'Espinay, seigneur de Saint-Luc, then Grand Master of the French artillery and governor of Brouage.
  - Roger de Saint-Lary and Bellegarde, baron de Termes, Grand Squire of France, first gentleman of the King's chambers and then duc de Bellegarde.
  - Henri d'Albret, comte de Marennes, baron de Miossens.
  - Antoine, seigneur de Roquelaure, Marshal of France and lieutenant général in Guienne.
  - Charles d'Humières, marquis d'Ancre, lieutenant général in Picardy.
  - Guillaume de Hautemer, seigneur de Fervaques, comte de Grancey, Marshal of France.
  - François de Cugnac, seigneur de Dampierre, Marshal General of France.
  - Antoine de Silly, comte de la Rochepot, governor of Anjou, ambassador in Spain.
  - Odet de Matignon, comte de Torigni, lieutenant-général in Normandy.
  - François de La Grange, seigneur de Montigny, then Marshal of France.
  - Charles de Balsac, baron de Dunes.
  - Charles II de Cossé, comte, then duc de Brissac, Marshal of France.
  - Pierre de Mornay, seigneur de Buhi, maréchal de camp and lieutenant général in Isle de France.
  - François de la Magdelaine, marquis de Ragny, governor of Nivernais.
  - Claude de l'Isle, seigneur de Marivaut, governor of Laon.
  - Charles de Choiseul, marquis de Praslin, Marshal of France.
  - Humbert de Marcilly, seigneur de Cipierre, Marshal General of France.
  - Gilbert de Chazeron, governor of Lyonnais.
  - René de Viau, seigneur de Chanlivaut, governor of Auxerrois.
  - Claude Gruel, seigneur de la Frette, governor of Chartres.
  - Georges Babou, seigneur de la Bourdaisière, captain of the 100 Gentlemen of la maison du Roi.

=== Third promotion (5 January 1597) ===
- Knights received in the church of the Saint-Ouen Abbey of Rouen :
  - Henry I, duke of Montmorency, pair, Marshal and Constable of France.
  - Hercule de Rohan, duc de Montbazon, comte de Rochefort, pair, Grand veneur of France and governor of Paris.
  - Charles de Montmorency, baron, then duc de Damville, Admiral of France.
  - Alphonse d'Ornano, colonel général of the Corsicans, Marshal of France.
  - Urbain de Laval, seigneur de Bois-Dauphin, marquis de Sablé, Marshal of France.
  - Charles II de Luxembourg, comte de Brienne and Roussy, governor of Metz.
  - Gilbert de La Trémoille, marquis de Royan, comte d'Olonne, captain of the 100 Gentlemen of la maison du Roi and sénéchal of Poitou.
  - Jacques Chabot, marquis de Mirebeau, comte de Charny, mestre de camp of the regiment of Champagne and lieutenant général in Bourgogne.
  - Jean, sire de Bueil, comte de Sancerre and Marans, Grand-échanson de France.
  - Guillaume de Gadagne, baron de Verdun, seigneur de Bouthéon, governor of Lyonnais.
  - Louis de L'Hôpital, marquis de Vitry, captain of the King's Life guards, governor of Meaux.
  - Pons de Lauzières-Thémines-Cardaillac, marquis de Thémines, sénéchal and governor of Quercy, Marshal of France.
  - Louis d'Ognies, comte de Chaulnes, governor of Péronne, Montdidier and Roye.
  - Edme de Malain, baron de Lux, lieutenant général in Bourgogne.
  - Antoine d'Aumont de Rochebaron, comte de Châteauroux, marquis de Nolay, governor of Boulogne.
  - Louis de La Châtre, baron de la Maisonfort, governor of Berry, then Marshal of France.
  - Jean de Durfort, seigneur de Born, lieutenant général of the artillery of France.
  - Louis de Bueil, seigneur de Racan, Marshal General of France, governor of Croizic.
  - Claude d'Harville, seigneur de Paloiseau, baron de Nainville, governor of Compiègne and Calais.
  - Eustache de Conflans, vicomte d'Ouchy, lieutenant général, governor of Saint-Quentin.
  - Louis de Grimonville, seigneur de Larchant, governor of Evreux.
  - Charles de Neufville, baron then marquis d'Alincourt and Villeroy, comte de Bury, Grand Marshal of the King's bedchamber and governor of Lyonnais.

=== Fourth promotion (2 January 1599) ===
- Knights received in the Grands-Augustins church in Paris.
  - Anne de Lévis, duc de Ventadour, pair de France, governor of Limousin, lieutenant général of the government of Languedoc.
  - Jacques Mitte de Chevrières, comte de Miolans, seigneur de Chévrières, baron de Saint-Chaumont, lieutenant général of the government of Lyonnais.
  - Jean-François de Faudoas d'Averton, comte de Belin, governor of Ham, Paris and Calais.
  - Bertrand de Baylens, baron de Poyanne, governor of Acqs and sénéchal of Bordeaux.
  - René de Rieux, seigneur de Sourdéac, marquis d'Oixant (Ouessant), governor of Brest.
  - Brandelis de Champagne, marquis de Villaines.
  - Jacques de l'Hospital, marquis de Choisi, governor and sénéchal of Auvergne.
  - Robert de La Vieuville, baron de Rugle, Grand Falconer of France, and governor of Reims.
  - Charles de Matignon, comte de Torigni, lieutenant général in Basse-Normandie.
  - François Juvénal des Ursins, marquis de Trainel, colonel of the French Reiters, Marshal General of France, ambassador in England.

=== Fifth promotion (1606) ===
- Prelate :
  - Jacques Davy du Perron, cardinal archbishop of Sens, Grand Almoner of France

=== Sixth promotion (12 March 1608) ===
- Knights received in Rome :
  - Alexandre Sforza-Conti, duc de Segni, prince de Valmontane, comte de Santafior
  - Jean Antoine Ursin, duc de Santo-Gemini, prince de Scandriglia, and comte d'Ercole

=== During the reign of Henri IV, knights and commanders appointed and died without having been received ===
- Commandeur :
  - Charles, cardinal de Bourbon, archbishop of Rouen.
- Knights :

==== Year 1595 ====
- Anne d'Anglure, marquis de Givry
- Michel d'Estourmel, seigneur de Guyencourt
- Jean de Montluc, Marshal of France
- Gaspard de Schomberg, colonel of the Reiters
- Jean de Levis, seigneur de Mirepoix
- Jean, marquis de Goetquen
- Robert de Harlay
- François de Senicourt

==== Year 1599 ====
- Sebastien marquis de Rosmadec

==== Year 1604 ====
- Henri de Noailles
- Nicolas de Harlay
- François de l'Isle
- Jean-Paul d'Esparbès de Lussan
- Bernard de Beon du Masses
- Jean de Gontault
- Jérôme de Gondi

== Under Louis XIII ==
Louis XIII, third sovereign head of the order, received the collar on 18 October 1610, the day after his coronation.

=== First promotion (18 October 1610) ===
- Knight :
  - Henri de Bourbon, II, Prince of Condé, first Peer and Grand Master of France

=== Second promotion (September 1618) ===
- Prelate :
  - François de La Rochefoucauld, cardinal, Bishop of Senlis, Grand Almoner of France

=== Third promotion (31 December 1619) ===
- Prelates received in the Grands-Augustins Church in Paris :
  - Henri de Gondi, cardinal of Retz, bishop of Paris, master of l'Oratoire du roi.
  - Bertrand d'Eschaud, archbishop of Tours and first almoner of the King.
  - Christophe de Lestang, bishop of Carcassonne and master of the King's chapel.
  - Gabriel de L'Aubespine, bishop of Orléans.
  - Arthur d'Épinay de Saint-Luc, bishop of Marseille.
- Knights :
  - Gaston Jean-Baptiste de France, duc d'Orléans, brother of King Louis XIII.
  - Louis de Bourbon, comte de Soissons, pair and Grand-master of France, governor of Dauphiné.
  - Charles de Lorraine, duc de Guise, pair de France, prince de Joinville, governor of Provence.
  - Henri de Lorraine, duc de Mayenne and Aiguillon, pair and Grand Chamberlain of France, governor of Guyenne.
  - Claude de Lorraine, prince de Joinville, duc de Chevreuse, pair and Grand Chamberlain of France, governor of Haute and Basse Marche.
  - César, duc de Vendôme, Beaufort, Étampes and Ponthièvre, prince de Martigues, governor of Bretagne, pair and then Grand master and surintendant général of the navigation and commerce of France.
  - Charles de Valois, duc d'Angoulême, comte d'Auvergne, etc., pair de France and colonel général of the light cavalry.
  - Charles de Lorraine, duc d'Elbeuf, pair de France, governor of Picardie.
  - Henri, duc de Montmorency, pair and admiral of France, governor of Languedoc, then Marshal of France.
  - Emmanuel de Crussol, duc d'Uzès, pair de France, honorary knight of Queen Anne of Austria.
  - Henri de Gondi, duc of Retz and Beaupreau, pair de France.
  - Charles d'Albert, duc de Luynes, pair and Grand Falconer of France, governor of Picardie, Constable of France.
  - Honoré d'Albert, duc de Chaulnes, pair and Marshal of France, governor of Picardie.
  - Louis de Rohan, comte de Rochefort, then prince de Guémené, duc de Montbazon, pair and Grand veneur de France.
  - Joachim de Bellengreville, seigneur de Neuville-Gambetz, de Bomicourt, etc., Provost of l'hôtel du Roi and of France.
  - Martin III du Bellay, prince of Yvetot, marquis of Thouarcé, etc., lieutenant général in Normandy, then in Anjou, captain of 50 armed men of the Ordinances, Marshal General of France.
  - Charles, sire de Créquy, prince de Poix, comte de Sault, then duc de Lesdiguières, pair and marshal of France.
  - Gilbert Filhet, seigneur de la Curée and la Roche-Turpin, captain of 50 armed men, Marshal General of France.
  - Philippe de Béthune, comte de Charost, bailli de Mantes and Meulant, ambassador in Scotland, Rome, Savoy and Germany.
  - Charles de Coligny, marquis d'Andelot, lieutenant général of the government of Champagne.
  - Jean François de La Guiche, seigneur de Saint-Géran, comte de la Palisse, governor of Bourbonnais, then Marshal of France.
  - René Du Bec, marquis de Vardes and La Bosse, State councillor, captain of 50 armed men, governor of pays de Thiérache.
  - Antoine Arnaud de Pardaillan de Gondrin, seigneur de Pardaillan, Gondrin and Antin, marquis de Montespan, captain of the Life Guards, maréchal de camps, and lieutenant général in the province of Guyenne.
  - Henri de Schomberg, comte de Nanteuil, Superintendent of Finances, governor of Haute and Basse Marche and Limousin, Marshal of France.
  - François de Bassompierre, colonel général of the Swiss, then Marshal of France.
  - Henri de Bourdeille, vicomte de Bourdeille, marquis d'Archiac, captain of 100 armed men, sénéchal and governor of Périgord.
  - Jean-Baptiste d'Ornano, comte de Montlor, colonel général of the Corsicans, lieutenant général in Normandy, governor of the King's brother, then Marshal of France.
  - Timoléon d'Espinay, seigneur de Saint-Luc, comte d'Estelan, governor of Brouage, lieutenant général in Guyenne and Marshal of France.
  - Henri de Bauffremont, marquis de Sénecey, governor of Auxonne.
  - René Potier, comte then Duke of Tresmes, pair de France, captain of the Life Guards, lieutenant général of the government of Champagne.
  - Philippe-Emmanuel de Gondi, comte de Joigny, général of the galleys.
  - Charles d'Angennes, marquis de Rambouillet, vidame du Mans, seigneur d'Arquenay, etc., captain of the 100 Gentlemen of la maison du Roi, ambassadeur extraordinaire in Spain.
  - Louis de Crévant, vicomte de Brigueil, marquis d'Humières, captain of the 100 Gentlemen of la maison du Roi and governor of Compiègne.
  - Bertrand de Vignolles, dit de la Hire, baron de Vignolles, seigneur de Casaubon and Preschat, lieutenant général in Champagne, First Marshal General of France, governor of Sainte-Ménéhould.
  - Antoine II de Gramont, souverain de Bidache, comte de Guiche and Louvignières, then duc de Gramont, vice-roi de Navarre and Béarn, governor of Bayonne.
  - François Nompar de Caumont, comte de Lauzun, State councillor, captain of 50 armed men.
  - Melchior Mitte, comte de Miolans, marquis de Saint-Chaumontand Montpezal, seigneur de Chevrières, State minister, lieutenant général of the King's armies, and government of Provence, ambassadeur extraordinaire in Rome.
  - Léonor de la Magdeleine, Seigneur then marquis de Ragny, King's lieutenant in the county of Charollois.
  - Jean de Warignies, seigneur de Blainville, master of the King's wardrobe.
  - Léon d'Albert, seigneur de Brantes, captain lieutenant of the Guards light horse, governor of Blaye, then duc de Piney-Luxembourg and pair de France.
  - Nicolas de Brichanteau, marquis de Nangis, State councillor, captain of 50 armed men.
  - Charles de Vivonne, baron de la Chasteigneraye, governor of Parthenay.
  - André de Cochefilet, comte de Vauvineux, baron de Vaucelas, ambassador in Spain.
  - Gaspard Dauvet, seigneur des Marêts, State councillor, governor of Beauvais and pays de Beauvaisis, ambassador in England.
  - Lancelot, seigneur de Vassé, baron de la Roche-Mabile, seigneur d'Esquilly, etc., State councillor.
  - Charles, sire de Rambures, maréchal de camps, governor of Doullens.
  - Antoine de Buade, seigneur de Frontenac, baron de Palluau, captain of the Saint-Germain-en-Laye castle, first master of l'hôtel du Roi.
  - Nicolas de L'Hospital, marquis then duc de Vitry, Marshal of France, governor of la Brie.
  - Jean de Souvré, Marquis de Courtanvaux, State councillor, first gentilhomme of the King's Chamber, and governor of Touraine.
  - François de L'Hospital, seigneur du Hallier, comte de Rosnay, captain of the King's Life guards, then Marshal of France and State minister.
  - Louis de la Marck, marquis de Mauny, first Squire of Queen Anne of Austria.
  - Charles de La Vieuville, marquis then duc de La Vieuville, captain of the King's Life guards, Superintendent of Finances, and Grand Falconer of France.
  - Louis d'Aloigny, marquis de Rochefort, baron de Craon and bailli du Berri.
  - César-Auguste de Saint-Lary, baron de Termes, Grand Squire of France.
  - Alexandre de Rohan, marquis de Marigny, captain of 100 armed men.
  - François de Silly, comte then duc de la Rocheguyon, Grand Louvetier de France.
  - Antoine-Hercule de Budos, marquis de Portes, vice-amiral de France.
  - François V, comte then duc de La Rochefoucauld, governor of Poitou.
  - Jacques d'Etampes, seigneur de Valençai, Grand Marshal of the King's bedchamber, then governor of Calais.
  - Henri d'Albret, baron de Moissens, mestre de camp of a thousand-foot soldiers maintained for the King in the country of Bigorre.

=== Fourth promotion (26 July 1622) ===
At the Grenoble cathedral.

- François de Bonne, duc de Lesdiguières, pair and Constable of France, governor and lieutenant général of Dauphiné.

=== Fifth promotion (28 June 1625) ===
At the chapel of Somerset House, London, on 28 June 1625.

- Antoine Coeffier, dit Ruzé, marquis d'Effiat and Longjumeau, baron de Massy and Beaulieu, governor of Bourbonnais and Auvergne, surintendant of Finances and then Marshal of France.

=== Sixth promotion (24 March 1632) ===
- Prelate :
  - Alfonse-Louis du Plessis de Richelieu, cardinal and archbishop of Lyon, Grand almoner of France.

=== Seventh promotion (14 may 1633) ===
At Fontainebleau.

- Prelates :
  - Armand-Jean du Plessis, cardinal, duc de Richelieu, pair de France, Grand master and surintendant général of the navigation and commerce, governor of Bretagne.
  - Louis de Nogaret, cardinal de la Valette, archbishop of Toulouse.
  - Claude de Rebé, archbishop of Narbonne, président of the States of Languedoc.
  - Jean-François de Gondi, first archbishop of Paris, master of the King's chapel.
  - Henri d'Escoubleau de Sourdis, archbishop of Bordeaux, primate of Aquitaine.

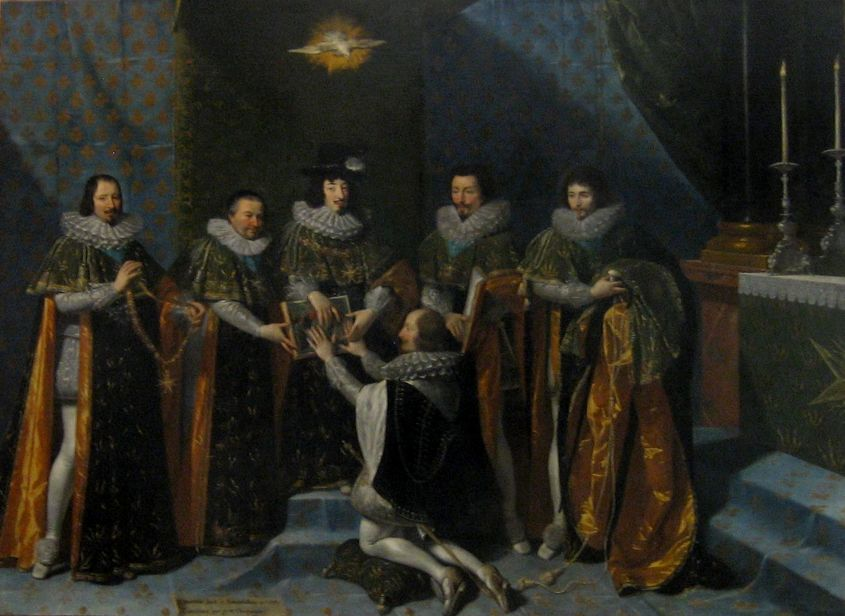
Réception d'Henri II d'Orléans, Duc de Longueville, dans l'ordre du Saint-Esprit par le roi Louis XIII, le 15 mai 1633, Philippe de Champaigne (1602–1674), Musée des Augustins (Toulouse).

- Knights :
  - Henri d'Orléans, duc de Longueville, governor of Normandie.
  - Henri de Lorraine, comte d'Harcourt, Grand Squire de France.
  - Louis de Valois, comte d'Alets, then duc d'Angoulême and governor of Provence.
  - Henri de La Trémoille, duc de Thouars, pair de France, prince de Tarente and Talmond, comte de Laval, etc.
  - Charles de Lévis, duc de Ventadour, pair de France, lieutenant général in Languedoc and governor of Limousin.
  - Henri de Nogaret de La Valette, dit de Foix, duc de Candale, pair de France.
  - Charles de Schomberg, duc de Halluin, colonel général of the Reiters, Marshal of the German troops, governor of Languedoc, pair and Marshal of France.
  - François de Cossé, duc de Brissac, pair and Grand Panetier of France.
  - Bernard de Nogaret, de la Valette and Foix, duc de la Valette and Epernon, colonel général of the French infantry française, governor of Metz.
  - Charles-Henri, comte de Clermont and Tonnerre, marquis de Crusy, etc., first baron and hereditary Constable of the Dauphiné, State councillor and captain of 100 armed men.
  - François Hannibal d'Estrées, marquis de Cœuvres, Marshal of France, then duc and pair of France.
  - Jean de Nettancourt, comte de Vaubecourt, baron d'Orne and Choiseul, State councillor, Marshal General of France, governor of Châlons.
  - Henri I de Saint-Nectaire, or Senneterre, marquis de la Ferté-Nabert, ambassador in England and Rome, State minister.
  - Philibert, vicomte de Pompadour, the King's lieutenant général in Limousin.
  - René aux Epaules, dit de Laval, marquis de Néelle, maréchal de camp.
  - Guillaume de Simiane, marquis de Gordes, captain of the Life Guards.
  - Charles, comte de Lannoi, first maître d'hôtel du Roi, governor of Montreuil.
  - François de Nagu, marquis de Varennes, governor of Aigue-Mortes.
  - Urbain de Maillé, marquis de Brézé, Marshal of France, governor of Calais and Saumur.
  - Jean de Galard de Béarn, comte de Brassac, governor of Saintonge.
  - François de Noailles, comte d'Ayen, State councillor, captain of 100 armed men of the Ordinances, Marshal General of France, lieutenant général in Auvergne.
  - Bernard de Baylens, baron de Poyanne, lieutenant général in pays de Béarn.
  - Gabriel de La Vallée-Fossés, marquis d'Everly, maréchal de camp, governor of Lorraine and of Montpellier and Verdun.
  - Charles de Livron, marquis de Bourbonne, lieutenant général en Champagne, maréchal de camp.
  - Gaspard-Armand, vicomte de Polignac, marquis de Chalançon, governor of Puy-en-Velay.
  - Louis, vicomte then duc d'Arpajon, marquis de Séverac, lieutenant général of the King's armies.
  - Charles d'Escoubleau, marquis de Sourdis and Alluye, State councillor, Marshal General of France, governor of Orléans.
  - François de Blanchefort de Bonne de Créqui, comte de Sault, then duc de Lesdiguières, pair de France and governor of Dauphiné.
  - François de Béthune, comte d'Orval, then duc de Béthune, first Squire of Queen Anne of Austria.
  - Claude de Rouvroy de Saint-Simon, pair and Grand Louvetier de France, then duc de Saint-Simon.
  - Charles du Camboût, baron de Pont-Château and la Roche-Bernard, marquis de Coislin, governor of Brest, the King's lieutenant général in Basse-Bretagne.
  - François de Vignerot, marquis du Pont-de-Courlai, governor of Havre de Grâce, then général of the galleys of France.
  - Charles de La Porte, marquis then duc de la Meilleraye, pair, Grand master of the artillery and Marshal of France.
  - Gabriel de Rochechouart, marquis then duc de Mortemart, pair of France, and governor of Paris.
  - Antoine d'Aumont de Rochebaron, seigneur de Villequier, then duke, pair and Marshal of France
  - Just-Henri, comte de Tournon and Roussillon, sénéchal d'Auvergne, maréchal de camp.
  - Louis de Mouy, seigneur de la Meilleraye, lieutenant général of the government of Normandie.
  - Charles de Damas, comte de Thianges, maréchal de camp, lieutenant général of pays de Bresse and Charollois.
  - Hector de Gelas de Voisins, marquis de Leheron and Ambres, vicomte de Lautrec, sénéchal and governor of Lauragais.
  - Henri de Baudean, comte de Parabère, marquis de la Mothe-Sainte-Heraye, vicomte de Pardaillan, seigneur de Castelnau, etc., State councillor, governor of Haut and Bas-Poitou.
  - Jean de Monchy, marquis de Montcavrel, governor of Ardres and Etampes.
  - Roger du Plessis, seigneur de Liancourt, marquis de Guercheville, comte de la Rocheguyon, then duc de Liancourt and pair de France.
  - Charles de Rouvroy de Saint-Simon, a.k.a. marquis de Saint-Simon, seigneur du Plessis and Pont-Sainte-Maixence, colonel of the regiment of Navarre, lieutenant général of the King's armies and governor of Senlis.

=== Eighth promotion (22 may 1642) ===
At camp before the city of Perpignan.

- Knight :
  - Honoré II Grimaldi, prince de Monaco, first duc de Valentinois, pair de France

=== Knights appointed during the reign of Louis XIII, who died without having been received ===
==== 1611 ====
- François de Monceaux d'Auxi, baron de Mérigny, vice-admiral of Normandy
- François Damas, seigneur de Thianges
- Christophe de Harlay, Count of Beaumont, ambassador in England.
- Pierre de Harcourt, marquis de Beuvron

==== 1612 ====
- François d'Esparbès de Lussan, marquis d'Aubeterre, Marshal of France
- Isaac de La Rochefoucauld, baron de Montendre

==== 1613 ====
- Armand-Léon de Durfort, seigneur de Born, lieutenant général of the artillery of France

==== 1614 ====
- Antoine d'Authun, seigneur de la Baume, sénéchal of Lyon
- Charles comte d'Escars, baron d'Aix

==== 1615 ====
- Louis de Montbron, seigneur de Fontaines and Chalandray
- César de Dizimieu, governor of the city and castle of Vienne
- Étienne de Bonne, vicomte de Tallard

==== 1616 ====
- Léon de Durfort
- Louis de Gouffier, duc de Rouannois

==== 1618 ====
- Emmanuel de Savoie, baron de Pressigny, sénéchal and governor of Châtellerault
- Henri des Prez, seigneur de Montpezat
- Charles de Balzac, bishop and comte de Noyon, pair of France
- Claude de Joyeuse, comte de Grand-Pré

==== 1619 ====
- Alexandre de Vieuxpont, marquis de Coëmur, vice-amiral of Bretagne
- André d'Oraison
- Jacques de Castille, baron de Castelnau
- Claude-François de la Baume, comte de Mont-Revel
- Henri de Balzac, seigneur de Clermont d'Entragues
- Edme de Rochefort, marquis de la Boullaye, lieutenant général in Nivernois

==== 1621 ====
- Jacques du Blé, marquis d'Uxelles.

==== 1625 ====
- François de Savary, marquis de Maulevrier
- François de L'Aubespine, baron de Hauterive

==== 1626 ====
- Adrien de Montluc Montesquiou, prince de Chabannois, lieutenant général in pays de Foix

==== 1629 ====
- César de Balzac d'Entragues, seigneur de Gré
- Jean-Louis de Rochechouart, seigneur de Chandenier
- Louis de Marillac, comte de Beaumont-le-Roger, Marshal of France

==== 1633 ====
- Emmanuel-Philibert de la Beraudière
- Jean Caylar d'Anduze de Saint-Bonnet, seigneur de Thoiras, Marshal of France
- Charles de Levis, comte de Charlus
- Entio, marquis de Bentivoglio
- Georges de Brancas, duc de Villars, pair de France

== Under Louis XIV ==
Louis XIV, known as 'the great', fourth head and sovereign Grand maître de l'Ordre, received the collar of l'Ordre the day after his coronation on 8 June 1654.

=== First promotion (Paris, 28 April 1653) ===
- Prelate :
  - Antoine Barberini, cardinal bishop of Palestrine, archbishop and duc de Reims, named Grand aumônier de France.

=== Second promotion (Reims, 8 June 1654) ===
- Knight :
  - Philippe de France, duc d'Anjou, then duc d'Orléans, only brother of the King.

=== Third promotion (Paris, 31 December 1661) ===
- Prelates :
  - Camille de Neufville de Villeroy, archbishop of Lyon
  - François Adhémar de Monteil, de Grignan, archbishop of Arles
  - Georges d'Aubusson de la Feuillade, bishop of Metz, before archbishop of Embrun
  - François Harlay de Champvallon, pair de France, archbishop of Rouen, then archbishop of Paris
  - Léonor Goyon de Matignon, bishop of Lizieux
  - Gaspard de Daillon du Lude, bishop of Albi
  - Henri de La Mothe-Houdancourt, bishop of Rennes, then archbishop of Auch
  - Philibert-Emmanuel de Beaumanoir de Lavardin, bishop of Le Mans
- Knights :
  - Louis II de Bourbon-Condé, prince de Condé, first pair de France, duc d'Enghien
  - Henri Jules de Bourbon-Condé, duc d'Enghien, prince de Condé, pair and Grand Master of France.
  - Armand de Bourbon-Conti, prince de Conti, governor of Languedoc
  - Henri de Bourbon, duc de Verneuil, pair de France
  - Louis, duc de Vendôme et de Mercœur, pair de France, governor of Provence, then cardinal and Papal legate in France
  - François de Vendôme, duc de Beaufort, pair de France, Grand Master and superintendent of navigation and commerce of France
  - François de Crussol, duc d'Uzès, pair de France
  - Louis Charles d'Albert de Luynes, duc de Luynes, pair and Grand Falconer of France
  - Charles d'Albert, dit d'Ailly, duc de Chaulnes, pair de France, governor of Bretagne
  - François, duc de La Rochefoucauld, prince de Marcillac, pair de France and governor of Poitou
  - Pierre de Gondi, duc de Retz, pair de France and général of the galleys.
  - Antoine III, duc de Gramont, pair and marshal of France
  - César de Choiseul, duc de Choiseul, pair and marshal of France, comte du Plessis-Praslin
  - Nicolas de Neufville de Villeroy, duc de Villeroy, pair and marshal of France
  - Charles, duc de Créqui, prince de Poix, pair de France, governor of Paris
  - Jacques d'Étampes, marquis de la Ferté-Imbaud and Mauny, marshal of France
  - Henri II de Saint-Nectaire ou Sennecterre, duc de la Ferté, pair and marshal of France, governor of Metz
  - Philippe de Montaut, duc de Navailles, marshal of France
  - Jacques Rouxel, comte de Grancey and Médavi, marshal of France
  - Gaston-Jean-Baptiste, duc de Roquelaure, governor of Guyenne
  - Philippe-Julien Mazarini-Mancini, duc de Nevers, governor of Nivernois and pays d'Aunis
  - Jules Cesarini, duc de Cittanova, Roman baron romain (gets his collier only in 1662 in Rome)
  - François Honorat de Beauvilliers, duc de Saint-Aignan, pair de France, first gentleman of the King's chamber.
  - Henri de Daillon, comte then duc de Lude, Grand master of the artillery of France
  - Louis de Béthune, duc de Charost, dit de Béthune, lieutenant général in Picardy
  - Anne de Noailles, duc de Noailles, comte d'Ayen, pair de France and governor of the county of Roussillon
  - François de Comminges, seigneur de Guitaut, governor of Saumur
  - François de Clermont, comte de Tonnerre and Clermont, vicomte de Tallard
  - Alexandre-Guillaume de Melun, prince d'Épinoy, hereditary constable of Flanders.
  - César Phoebus d'Albret, marshal of France, governor of Guyenne
  - François-René Crespin Du Bec, marquis de Vardes, Captain of the Swiss Guards of the King.
  - Charles-Maximilien de Belleforière, marquis de Soyecourt, Grand Huntsman of France
  - François de Paule de Clermont, marquis de Monglat, comte de Chiverny, Grand master of the King's wardrobe
  - Philippe de Clérembault, comte de Palluau, marshal of France, governor of Berry
  - Jean de Schulemberg, comte de Montdejeu, marshal of France
  - Gaston Jean Baptiste, dit le comte de Comminges, governor of Saumur
  - François de Simiane and Pontevès, marquis de Gordes, Grand sénéchal of the Provence
  - Henri de Beringhen, seigneur d'Armainvilliers, first squire of the small stable of the King.
  - Jean Du Bouchet, marquis de Sourches, provost of the King's house and of France.
  - Charles, comte de Froulai, Grand marshal of the King's Chambers
  - Jacques-François, marquis de Hautefort, comte de Montignac, first squire of the Queen
  - François Goyon de Matignon, comte de Torigny, lieutenant général in Basse-Normandie
  - Charles de Sainte-Maure, duc de Montausier, pair de France, governor of Monseigneur le Dauphin
  - François d'Espinay, marquis de Saint-Luc, lieutenant général in Guyenne
  - Hippolite de Béthune, comte de Selles, a.k.a. comte de Béthune, honorary Knight of the Queen
  - Ferdinand de La Baume, comte de Montrevel, lieutenant général in the pays de Bresse, Bugei, etc.
  - Louis-Armand, vicomte de Polignac, marquis de Chalançon, governor of the city of Puy
  - Antoine de Brouilly, marquis de Piennes, governor of Pignerol
  - Jean, marquis de Pompadour, lieutenant général in Limousin
  - Louis de Cardaillac and Lévis, comte de Biculés, lieutenant général in Languedoc
  - Scipion de Grimoard de Beauvoir, comte de Roure, lieutenant général in Languedoc
  - François de Monstiers, comte de Mérinville and Rieux, lieutenant général in Provence
  - Henri de Baylens, marquis de Poyanne, lieutenant général in Béarn
  - Léon de Sainte-Maure, comte de Jonzac, lieutenant général of pays de Saintonge and Angoumois
  - Jacques Stuer, comte de La Vauguyon, marquis de Saint-Mégrin, Grand sénéchal of Guyenne
  - Charles-François de Joyeuse, comte de Grandpré, governor of Mouzon and Beaumont
  - Timoléon de Cossé, comte de Chateaugiron, Grand panetier de France
  - Charles-Martel, comte de Clère, captain of the French Life Guards of Monsieur, only brother of the King
  - Jean-Paul de Gourdon de Genouillac, comte de Vaillac, captain of the Life Guards of Monsieur, only brother of the King
  - Nicolas-Joachim Rouault, marquis de Gamaches, governor of Saint-Valeri and Rue
  - Godefroi, comte d'Estrades, governor of Dunkerque, life-time maire of Bordeaux, vice-roy of New France, marshal of France
  - René-Gaspard de la Croix, marquis de Castries, governor of Montpellier
  - Guillaume de Pêchepeyrou et de Comminges, comte de Guitaut, chamberlain and first gentleman of the chamber of M. le prince de Condé

=== Fourth promotion (Paris, 4 November 1663) ===
- Knight :
  - Christian Louis I, Duke of Mecklenburg

=== Fifth promotion (12 December 1671) ===
- Prelate :
  - Emmanuel-Théodose de La Tour d'Auvergne, cardinal of Bouillon, Grand Almoner of France.

=== Sixth promotion (Rome, 29 September 1675) ===
- Knights :
  - Flavio Orsini, Duke of Bracciano, Roman baron and prince de Soglio
  - Luigi di Sforza-Conti, Duke of Ognano and Segni
  - Filippo Colonna, prince of Sonnino

=== Seventh promotion (Saint-Germain-en-Laye, 22 December 1675) ===
- Knight :
  - François de Béthune, marquis de Chabris, ambassadeur extraordinaire in Poland

=== Eighth promotion (Żółkiew, Poland, 30 November 1676) ===
- Knight :
  - John III Sobieski, King of Poland, Grand Duke of Lithuania

=== Ninth promotion (Saint-Germain-en-Laye, 1 January 1682) ===
- Knight :
  - Louis de France, dauphin de Viennois, only legitimately born son of Louis XIV.

=== Tenth promotion (Versailles, 2 June 1686) ===
- Knights :
  - Philippe d'Orléans, duc d'Orléans, de Chartres, etc., son of Philippe I, Duke of Orléans, the King's only brother. Later regent of France.
  - Louis III, Prince of Condé, duc de Bourbon, prince du sang, pair and Grand Master of France, then duc d'Enghien
  - François Louis de Bourbon-Conti, prince de Conti
  - Louis Auguste de Bourbon, legitimized son of the King, duc du Maine, pair de France, Grand master of the artillery of France, colonel général of the Swiss and Grisons.

=== Eleventh promotion (Versailles, 31 December 1688) ===
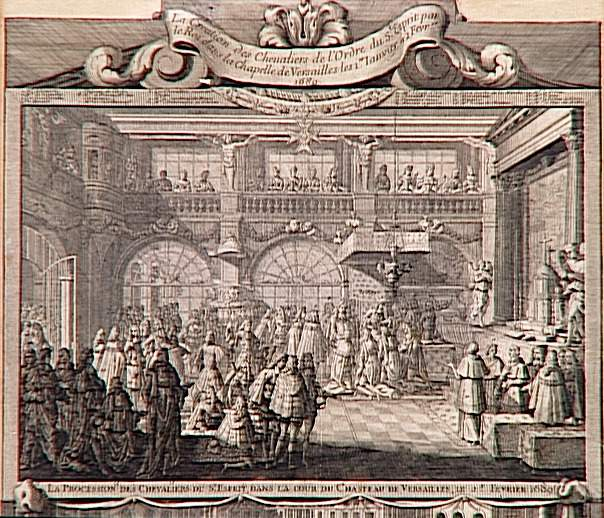
Reception of the Knights of the Order of the Holy Spirit in the Chapel of Versailles on 1 January and 2 February 1689

- Prelates :
  - César d'Estrées, cardinal of Trinité-des-Monts, before bishop and Duke of Laon, pair de France
  - Pierre de Bonzi, cardinal of Saint-Onuphre, archbishop of Narbonne
  - Charles-Maurice Le Tellier, archbishop and Duke of Reims, First pair de France
  - Pierre du Cambout de Coislin, later cardinal of Trinité-des-Monts, bishop of Orléans, first Almoner of the King, then Grand Almoner of France.
- Knights :
  - Louis-Joseph, duc de Vendôme, pair de France, général of the galleys.
  - Louis, Count of Armagnac, Grand Squire of France, governor of Anjou.
  - Henri, Count of Brionne, received in survival of the charge of Grand Squire of France.
  - Philippe, Chevalier de Lorraine.
  - Charles de Lorraine, comte de Marsan.
  - Charles-Belgique-Hollande, sire de la Trémouille, duc de Thouars, pair de France, prince of Tarente and First Gentleman of the King's Chamber.
  - Emmanuel II de Crussol, Duke of Uzès, Peer of France.
  - Maximilien Pierre François de Béthune, 3rd duc de Sully, pair de France, marquis de Rosny.
  - Charles Honoré d'Albert, duc de Luynes and Chevreuse, pair de France.
  - Armand-Jean de Vignerot du Plessis-Richelieu, duc de Richelieu and Fronsac, pair de France.
  - François VII, duc de La Rochefoucauld, pair and Grand Huntsman of France.
  - Louis Grimaldi, prince de Monaco, pair de France and duc de Valentinois.
  - François Annibal III d'Estrées de Lauzière, duc d'Estrées, pair de France and marquis de Thémines.
  - Antoine Charles IV de Gramont, duc de Gramont, comte de Guiche and pair de France.
  - Armand Charles de La Porte de La Meilleraye, duc de Mazarin and Mayenne, pair de France and Grand Master of the artillery.
  - François de Neufville, duc de Villeroy, pair and marshal of France.
  - Paul de Beauvilliers, 2nd duc de Saint-Aignan, pair de France and grandee of Spain.
  - Henri-François de Foix de Candale, duc de Randan, pair de France and captal de Buch.
  - Léon Potier, Duke of Tresmes, a.k.a. Duke of Gesvres, pair de France, First Gentleman of the King's Chamber.
  - Anne Jules, duc de Noailles, pair and marshal of France.
  - Armand de Camboust, duc de Coislin, comte de Crécy, pair de France.
  - César, duc de Choiseul, pair de France, lieutenant général and later Marshal of France.
  - Louis-Marie-Victor d'Aumont de Rochebaron, duc d'Aumont, pair de France, marquis de Villequier.
  - François-Henri de Montmorency, duc de Piney-Luxembourg, pair and marshal of France.
  - François III, vicomte d'Aubusson, comte de la Feuillade, duc de Rouanez, marshal of France, Viceroy of Sicily and governor of the Dauphiné.
  - Bernardin Gigault, marquis de Bellefons, marshal of France.
  - Louis de Crevant, duc d'Humières, marshal of France and Grand Master of the artillery.
  - Jacques-Henri de Durfort, duc de Duras, governor of Franche-Comté, marshal of France.
  - Guy Aldonce II de Durfort, comte de Lorges, then duc de Quintin, marshal of France.
  - Armand de Béthune, duc de Charost, pair de France, lieutenant général in the government ofe Picardy.
  - Jean II d'Estrées, vice-admiral and marshal of France, viceroy of New France, lieutenant général in Bretagne.
  - Charles II, duc de La Vieuville, governor of Poitou, honorary Knight of the Queen and governor of Philippe d'Orléans, duc de Chartres.
  - Jean-Baptiste de Cassagnet, marquis de Tilladet, captain of the Swiss Guards in the King's Guards.
  - Louis de Caillebot, marquis de la Salle, master of the King's wardrobe.
  - Jacques-Louis de Beringhen, comte de Châteauneuf, first squire of the King.
  - Philippe de Courcillon, marquis de Dangeau, governor of Touraine, honorary Knight of Madame la Dauphine.
  - Philibert de Gramont, comte de Gramont, governor of pays d'Aunis and la Rochelle.
  - Louis François, duc de Boufflers, pair and marshal of France, Knight of the Golden Fleece, colonel of the French Guards.
  - François III d'Harcourt-Beuvron, marquis de Beuvron, lieutenant général in the government of Normandy.
  - Henri de Mornay, marquis de Montchevreuil, captain and governor of Saint-Germain en Laye.
  - Édouard-François Colbert, comte de Maulevrier, lieutenant général.
  - Joseph de Pons and Guimera, baron de Monclar, lieutenant général.
  - Henri-Charles de Beaumanoir, marquis de Lavardin, lieutenant général in Bretagne.
  - Pierre de Villars, marquis de Villars, State Counciller, lieutenant général, ambassador in Savoy, Denmark and Spain.
  - François Adhémar de Monteil, comte de Grignan, lieutenant général in Provence.
  - Claude de Choiseul, marquis de Francières, named comte de Choiseul, mashal of France.
  - Jacques III de Goyon, sire de Matignon, comte de Thorigny, lieutenant général in Basse-Normandie.
  - Jean-Armand de Joyeuse, named marquis de Joyeuse, marshal of France.
  - François de Calvo, lieutenant général des armées du Roi, governor of the city of Aire.
  - Charles, comte d'Aubigné, governor of Berri.
  - Charles de Montsaunin, comte de Montval, lieutenant général.
  - Claude de Thiard, comte de Bissy, lieutenant général.
  - Antoine Coëffier, dit Ruzé, marquis d'Effiat, first squire of Monsieur, the King's only brother.
  - François, comte de Montberon, lieutenant général.
  - Philippe-Auguste Le Hardy, marquis de La Trousse, captain-lieutenant of the Gendarmes-dauphins, lieutenant général.
  - François de Monestay, marquis de Chazeron, lieutenant général.
  - Bernard de La Guiche, comte de Saint-Géran, lieutenant général.
  - François d'Escoubleau, comte de Sourdis, lieutenant général.
  - Philippe-Emmanuel de Croÿ, prince de Solre, lieutenant général.
  - André de Béthoulat de Cossagne, comte de La Vauguyon, State Concillor, ambassador in Spain.
  - Georges de Monchy, marquis d'Hocquincourt, lieutenant général.
  - Olivier de Saint-Georges, marquis de Coüé-Vérac, lieutenant général and the King's commander in Poitou.
  - René Martel, marquis d'Arcy, ambassador in Savoy, governor of M. le duc de Chartres and State Councillor.
  - Alexis-Henri de Châtillon, marquis de Châtillon, irst gentleman of the chamber of Monsieur, the King's only brother.
  - Nicolas Chalon du Blé, marquis d'Uxelles, marshal of France.
  - René de Froulay, comte de Tessé, marshal of France, first squire of Madame la Dauphine and grandee of Spain.
  - Charles de Mornay, marquis de Villarceaux, captain-lieutenant of the Light Horse of Monsieur le Dauphin
  - Charles d'Étampes, marquis de Mauny, seigneur la Ferté-Imbaut, captain of the guards of Philippe de France, duc d'Orléans
  - Hyacinthe Quatrebarbes, marquis de La Rongère, honorary Knight of Madame, duchesse d'Orléans
  - Jean d'Audibret, comte de Lussan, first gentleman of the chamber of M. le prince de Condé

=== Twelfth promotion (Versailles, 29 May 1689) ===
- Prelate :
  - Toussaint Forbin de Janson, cardinal de Janson, bishop and count of Beauvais, Grand Almoner of France after the death of cardinal de Coislin, in 1706

=== Thirteenth promotion (Versailles, 2 February 1693) ===
- Knight :
  - Louis-Alexandre de Bourbon, legitimized son of Louis XIV, comte de Toulouse, pair, admiral and Grand Huntsman of France

=== Fourteenth promotion (Versailles, 2 February 1694) ===
- Prelate :
  - Guillaume-Egon de Fürstenberg, cardinal, bishop and prince of Strasbourg

=== Fifteenth promotion (Zhovkva, Russia, 13 April 1694) ===
- Knight :
  - Henri de la Grange, marquis d'Arquien, then cardinal

=== Sixteenth promotion (Versailles, 22 May 1695) ===
- Knights :
  - Louis de France, duc de Bourgogne, then Dauphin de Viennois.
  - Philippe de France, duc d'Anjou, then King of Spain.

=== Seventeenth promotion (Versailles, 1 January 1696) ===
- Prelate :
  - François de Clermont-Tonnerre, bishop and count of Noyon, pair de France
- Knights :
  - Louis de Guiscard, comte de Neuvy-sur-Loire, marquis de Guiscard-Magny, governor of Sedan and Namur, lieutenant-général.

=== Eighteenth promotion (Rome, 4 December 1696) ===
- Knight :
  - Antonio de Lanti de la Rouère, Roman prince, duc de Mommars

=== Nineteenth promotion (Versailles, 1 January 1698) ===
- Prelate :
  - Louis Antoine de Noailles, Archbishop of Paris, duc de Saint-Cloud and Peer of France, later cardinal

=== Twentieth promotion (Versailles, 2 February 1699) ===
- Knight :
  - Charles de France, duc de Berri

=== Twenty first promotion (Versailles, 7 June 1699) ===
- Knight :
  - Guido Vaïni, prince de Cantaloupe, duc de Selci

=== Twenty second promotion (Rome, 19 December 1700) ===
- Knights :
  - Aleksander Benedykt Sobieski, prince of Poland.
  - Konstanty Władysław Sobieski, brother of the previous.

=== Twenty third promotion (Versailles, 15 May 1701) ===
- Prelates :
  - Daniel de Cosnac, archbishop of Aix, First Almoner of the Duke of Orléans.
  - Henri-Charles du Cambout de Coislin, Bishop of Metz, First Almoner of the King.
- Knight :
  - Camille d'Hostun, marquis de la Beaume, duc de Tallard, marshal of France.

=== Twenty fourth promotion (Versailles, 2 February 1703) ===
- Knight :
  - Ferdinand, comte de Marchin and Saint-Empire, marquis de Clermont, marshal of France.

=== Twenty-fifth promotion (Versailles, 27 May 1703) ===
- Knight :
  - Charles-Amédée de Broglie, comte de Revel, lieutenant général.

=== Twenty sixth promotion (Versailles, 1 January 1705) ===
- Prelate :
  - Jean d'Estrées, abbot of Évron, Préau and St-claude, ambassador in Portugal
- Knight :
  - Roger Brulart, marquis de Sillery, vicomte de Puisieux, lieutenant général and ambassadeur extraordinaire in Switzerland

=== Twenty seventh promotion (Versailles, 2 February 1705) ===
- Knights :
  - Henri, duc d'Harcourt, pair and marshal of France.
  - Victor Marie d'Estrées, comte, puis duc d'Estrées, pair, vice-admiral and marshal of France, a.k.a. maréchal de Cœuvres then maréchal d'Estrées.
  - Hector de Villars, duc de Villars, pair and marshal of France, grandee of Spain First class, Knight in the order of the Golden Fleece and governor of the Provence.
  - Noël Bouton, marquis de Chamilly, marshal of France, governor of Strasbourg.
  - François-Louis de Rousselet, marquis de Châteaurenaut, vice-admiral and marshal of France.
  - Sébastien Le Prestre, seigneur de Vauban, marshal of France, general commissioner of the fortifications.
  - Conrad de Rozen, comte de Bolweiller, marshal of France.
  - Nicolas Auguste de La Baume, marquis de Montrevel, marshal of France.

=== Twenty eighth promotion (Versailles, 1 March 1705) ===
- Knight :
  - Don Isidoro de la Cueva y Benavides, marquis de Bedmar, grandee of Spain, general commander of the Southern Netherlands, viceroy of Sicily

=== Twenty ninth promotion (Versailles, 1 January 1709) ===
- Knight :
  - Louis IV Henri de Bourbon-Condé, duc d'Enghien, prince de Condé, pair and Grand Master of France, governor of Bourgogne.

=== Thirtieth promotion (Versailles, 1 January 1711) ===
- Knights :
  - Louis Armand II de Bourbon-Conti, prince de Conti, pair de France
  - Jacques-Léonor Rouxel, comte de Grancey and baron of Médavi, marshal of France
  - Léonor-Marie du Maine, comte du Bourg, baron de l'Espinasse, marshal of France, director general of the Cavalery.
  - François Zénobe Philippe Albergotti, lieutenant général
  - Louis-Vincent, marquis de Goësbriant, lieutenant général

=== Thirty first promotion (Versailles, 2 December 1712) ===
- Knight :
  - Louis, duc d'Aumont, pair de France, marquis de Piennes, comte de Berzé, etc., first gentleman of the King's chamber and ambassadeur extraordinaire in England.

=== Thirty second promotion (Versailles, 7 June 1713) ===
- Prelate :
  - Armand Gaston Maximilien, cardinal de Rohan, grand almoner of France, bishop and prince of Strasbourg

=== During the reign of Louis XIV, Knights named who died without being received ===
==== Year 1643 ====
- Roger de Bossost, baron d'Espenan
- Louis Goth, marquis de Rouillac, Marshal General of France

==== Year 1644 ====
- Giulio Cesare Colonna di Sciarra, II prince de Carbognano, duc de Bassanello
- N. de Soyecourt, Marshal General of France

==== Year 1646 ====
- Rostaing Antoine d'Eure-du-Puis Saint-Martin, seigneur d'Aiguebonne
- Antoine d'Estourmel, first Squire of Marguerite of Lorraine, Duchess of Orléans

==== Year 1648 ====
- Władysław IV Vasa, King of Poland, Knight in the Order of the Golden Fleece.
- Philippe de La Mothe-Houdancourt, marshal of France

==== Year 1649 ====
- N. marquis de Trans
- Dominique Séguier, bishop of Meaux

==== Year 1650 ====
- N. marquis d'Hautefort
- Claude Yves, marquis d'Allègre

==== Year 1651 ====
- Jacques de Mauvisière de Castelnau, marshal of France
- Roger-Hector de Pardaillan, marquis d'Antin
- Sébastien de Rosmadec, marquis de Molac
- Louis Châlon du Blé, marquis d'Huxelles
- Gabriel de Caumont, comte de Lauzun
- François Sicaire, marquis de Bourdeilles
- Charles-Antoine de Ferrières, marquis de Sauvebeuf
- Jean-Pierre, marquis d'Aubeterre
- Louis de Caillebot, marquis de la Salle
- N. de Barrault
- Isaac de Pas, marquis de Feuquières
- François de Choiseul, marquis de Praslin
- Louis Olivier, marquis de Leuville
- N. d'Aumont
- Henri Bourcier de Barry de Saint-Aulnès
- François de Gontaut de Biron
- Georges Isauré, marquis d'Hervaut
- Philibert de Pompadour, marquis de Laurière
- Jean de Lambert
- Philippe, baron de Meillars.
- Paul-Antoine de Cassagnet, marquis de Fimarcon
- Charles de Monchy d'Hocquincourt, marshal of France

==== Year 1652 ====
- N. d'Hauterive
- N. de Souillac de Maumeige
- N. baron de Clairavault
- Louis de Bridieu
- Hilaire de Laval, marquis de Trèves
- Achille de Harlay, marquis de Bréval-Chanvalon
- François-Marie de Broglio de Revel
- François de la Béraudière
- Odet de Harcourt, comte de Croisy
- N., marquis de Cauvisson
- Armand-Jean Mitte, marquis de Saint-Chaumont
- Nicolas Dauvet, comte Desmarêts, Grand fauconnier de France
- Antoine-François de Lamet

==== Year 1653 ====
- N., marquis du Bec, comte de Moret
- François, comte d'Estain

==== Year 1658 ====
- Jean de Peyre, comte de Troisvilles

==== Year 1661 ====
- Abraham de Fabert d'Esternay, Marshal of France, Governor of Sedan, appointed Knight on the Orders of the King, but did not take advantage of this honor, "not being in a position to prove himself. The letter whose Majesty honored him on the invincibility of this obstacle manifests the greatness and goodness of the master and eternalizes the merit of the subject. " (Catalogue des Chevaliers de l'Ordre du Saint-Esprit, p. 306.)

==== Year 1703 ====
- Don Juan Claros Pérez de Guzmán, 11th Duke of Medina Sidonia
- Don Francisco Casimiro Pimentel de Quiñones y Benavides, 9th Duke of Benavente.
- Don Fadrique de Toledo Osorio y Ponce de León, marquis de Villa-Franca, Grandee of Spain
- Don Juan Francesco Pacheco Gomez de Sandoval, count of La Puebla de Montalbán, etc.
- Don Luis Manuel Fernández de Portocarrero, cardinal archbishop of Toledo.

==== Year 1708 ====
- Joseph-Emmanuel de la Tremoille de Noirmoustier, cardinal archbishop of Cambrai.

== Under Louis XV ==
The fifth head and sovereign Grand maître de l'Ordre du Saint-Esprit, Louis XV received the collar of l'Ordre the day after his coronation, at Reims, on 27 October 1722.

=== 1st promotion (26 July 1717) ===
Proclaimed at Versailles, but reception done at Madrid :

- Knights :
  - Louis I of Spain, future King of Spain, still Prince of Asturias.
  - Rostain Cantelini, duke of Popoli, prince de Pettorano, master of the Artillery of the Kingdom of Naples.

=== 2nd promotion (27 October 1722) ===
- Knights :
  - Louis d'Orléans, duc d'Orléans, then duc de Chartres, first prince du sang and first pair de France.
  - Charles de Bourbon-Charolais, comte de Charolais.

=== 3rd promotion (3 June 1724, Versailles) ===
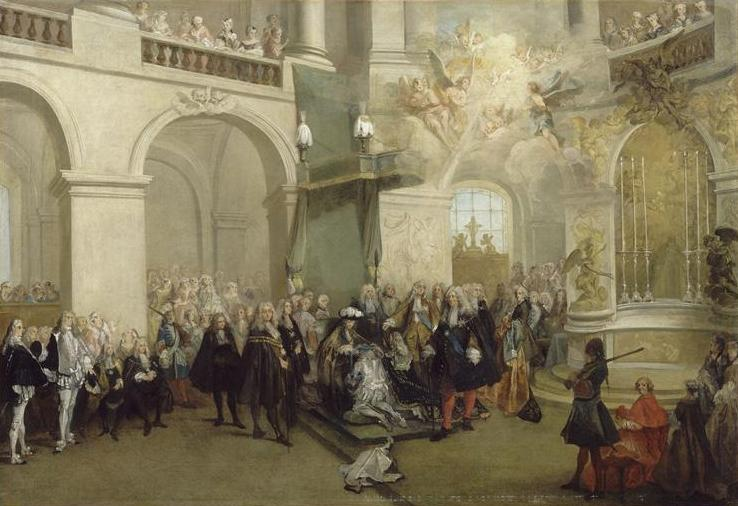
Nicolas Lancret (1690–1743), Presentation of the Order of the Holy Spirit in the Chapels of Versailles (3 June 1724), Musée du Louvre.

- Prelates :
  - Henri-Pons de Thiard de Bissy, cardinal-bishop of Meaux.
  - Léon Potier de Gesvres, archbishop of Bourges, then cardinal, abbot of Saint-Remi de Reims.
  - François Paul de Neufville de Villeroy, archbishop of Lyon, Primate of the Gauls.
  - Charles Gaspard Guillaume de Vintimille du Luc, archbishop of Aix, then of Paris, duc de Saint-Cloud and pair de France.
  - René François de Beauvau, archbishop of Narbonne.

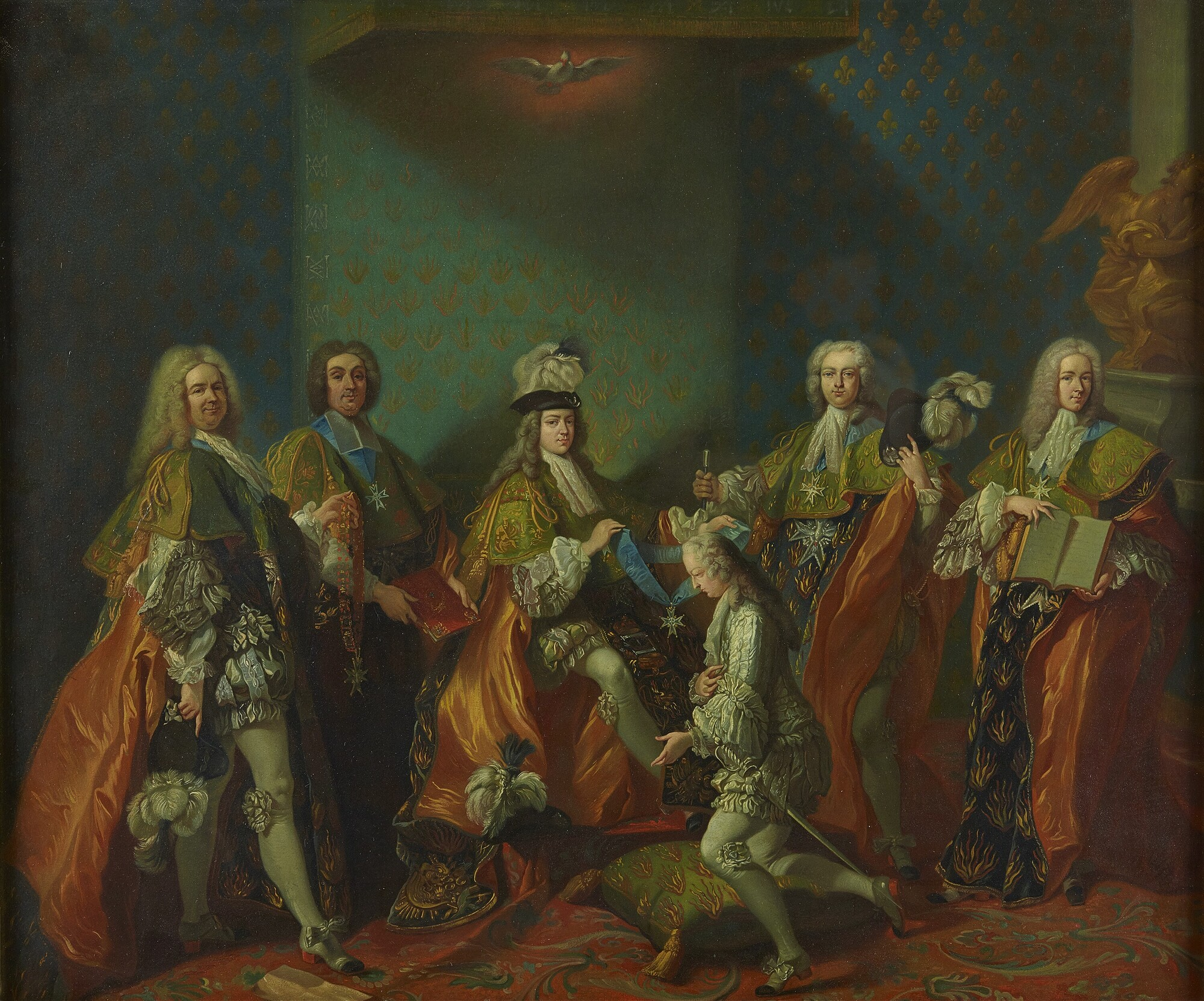
Jean-Baptiste van Loo (1684–1745), Louis XV presenting the cord of the Order of the Holy Spirit to the Count of Clermont in the chapel of Versailles, 3 June 1724, Versailles.

- Knights :
  - Louis de Bourbon-Condé (1709-1771), comte de Clermont-en-Argonne.
  - Charles de Lorraine, known as prince Charles, Grand Squire of France.
  - Charles-Louis de Lorraine, prince de Mortagne, sire de Pons, lieutenant general.
  - Jean-Charles de Crussol, duc d'Uzès, first pair de France, governor of Saintonge and Angoumois.
  - Maximilien-Henri de Béthune, duc de Sully, pair de France, prince d'Enrichemont, governor of Mantes.
  - Louis-Antoine de Brancas, duc de Villars, pair de France, comte de Lauragais.
  - François, duc de la Rochefoucauld, pair de France, Grand master of the King's wardrobe.
  - Charles-François-Frédéric de Montmorency-Luxembourg, duc de Piney-Luxembourg, pair de France, governor of Normandy.
  - Louis Nicolas de Neufville de Villeroy, duc de Villeroy, pair de France, captain of the Life Guards.
  - Louis de Rochechouart, duc de Mortemart, pair de France, first gentleman of the King's Chamber.
  - Paul-Hippolyte de Beauvilliers, duc de Saint-Aignan, pair de France, first gentleman of the King's Chamber and governor of Le Hâvre-de-Grâce.
  - François-Bernard Potier, duc de Tresme, pair de France, first gentleman of the King's Chamber.
  - Adrien Maurice de Noailles, duc de Noailles, pair de France, Knight of the Golden Fleece, Grandee of Spain first class, captain of the 1st company of the Life Guards and governor of Roussillon.
  - Armand de Béthune, duc de Charost, pair de France, captain of the Life Guards.
  - Jacques Fitz-James, duc de Berwick, Fitz-James, Léria and Xérica, peer of France and England, Grandee of Spain first class, Knight of the Order of the Garter and of the Golden Fleece, marshal of France.
  - Louis Antoine de Pardaillan de Gondrin, duc d'Antin, marquis de Montespan, pair de France, governor of Orléanais.
  - Louis Auguste d'Albert d'Ailly, duc de Chaulnes, pair de France, captain-lieutenant of the Guards light horse.
  - Marie-Joseph, duc d'Hostun, comte de Tallard, pair de France, governor of comté de Bourgogne.
  - Louis de Brancas, des comtes de Forcalquier, comte de Cereste, known as marquis de Brancas, Grandee of Spain, Knight of the Golden Fleece, etc., marshal of France.
  - Jacques Bazin, seigneur de Bezons, marshal of France, governor of Cambrai.
  - Pierre de Montesquiou d'Artagnan, marshal of France, governor of city and citadel of Arras.
  - Louis-Nicolas Le Tellier, marquis de Souvré, master of the King's wardrobe.
  - Louis Sanguin, marquis de Livry, first master of the King's Chambers.
  - Louis-Jean-Baptiste Goyon de Matignon, known as comte de Matignon, comte de Gacé, governor of pays d'Aunis.
  - Anne-Jacques de Bullion, marquis de Fervaques, governor of Maine.
  - Charles-François de Vintimille du Luc, des comtes de Marseille, comte du Luc, State councillor of the sword, King's lieutenant in the Provence.
  - Louis de Prie, marquis de Planès, known as marquis de Prie, ambassador in Turin.
  - Louis de Mailly, marquis de Nesle and Mailly en Boulonois, prince of Orange.

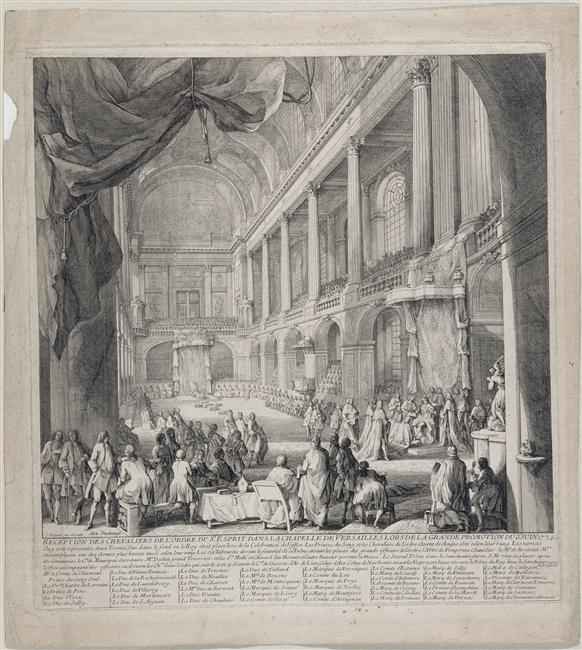
Reception of the knights of the order of the Holy Spirit in the chapel of Versailles during the great promotion of 3 June 1724, Jacques Rigaud (ca. 1681–1754), Musée national des châteaux de Versailles et de Trianon.

  - François-Marie de Hautefort, marquis de Hautefort, Pompadour and Sarcelles, lieutenant général.
  - Joseph de Montesquiou, known as comte d'Artagnan, lieutenant général and captain-lieutenant of the 1st company of Mousquetaires.
  - François, comte d'Estaing, marquis de Murole, lieutenant général.
  - Armand de Madaillan de Lesparre, marquis de Lassay, lieutenant général of the government of Bresse and Bugey.
  - Pierre Bouchard d'Esparbez de Lussan, comte d'Aubeterre, lieutenant général.
  - Joachim de Montaigu, vicomte de Beaune, marquis de Bouzoles, lieutenant général of the province of Auvergne.
  - François de Franquetot, comte de Coigny, lieutenant général and colonel-général of the dragoons, then duc de Coigny and marshal of France.
  - Jean de Montboisier, comte de Canillac, lieutenant général, captain-lieutenant of the 2nd company of Mousquetaires and governor of cities and citadels of Amiens and Corbie.
  - Jacques-Joseph Vipart, marquis de Silly, State councillor of the sword, lieutenant général.
  - Jacques de Cassagnet-Tilladet-Narbonne, marquis de Fimarcon, lieutenant général of the province of Roussillon, governor of Mont-Louis.
  - Henri de Saint-Nectaire, known as marquis de Sennecterre, lieutenant général and ambassador in England.
  - Pierre-Magdeleine de Beauvau, comte de Beauvau, lieutenant général.
  - Louis de Gand de Mérode de Montmorency, prince d'Isenghien, lieutenant général.
  - Louis-Pierre Engilbert de la Marck-Bouillon, known as comte de la Marck, lieutenant général.
  - César de Saint-Georges, marquis de Coué-Vérac, lieutenant général of the province of Poitou.
  - Alain-Emmanuel, marquis de Coëtlogon, marshal and vice-admiral of France, grand-cross in the Order of Saint-Louis.
  - Jean-Baptiste François Desmarets, marquis de Maillebois, master of the King's wardrobe, lieutenant général of Languedoc and governor of Saint-Omer.
  - Charles-Henri Gaspard de Saulx, vicomte de Tavannes, lieutenant général of the province of Bourgogne.
  - Gaspard de Clermont-Tonnerre, marquis de Vauvillars and Crusy, commissaire général of the cavalry, then marshal of France.
  - François de Simiane, marquis d'Esparron, first gentleman of the Chamber of the duc d'Orléans.
  - Joseph-François de la Croix, marquis de Castries, honorary knight of Madame la duchesse d'Orléans, governor and sénéchal of Montpellier.
  - Pierre-Gaspar, marquis de Clermont-Gallerande, first Squire of the duc d'Orléans, brigadier in the King's army and bailli of Dôle.

=== 4th promotion (1 January 1725) ===
- Knight :
  - Marie-Thomas-Auguste Goyon, chevalier marquis de Matignon, baron de Briquebec, comte de Gacé, brigadier des armées du Roi.

=== 5th promotion (1 January 1726) ===
- Knight:
  - Mikołaj Tarło of Tenczyn and Szczekarzewice, count of Melsztyn and Zakliczyn, colonel of the guards of Stanisław Leszczyński, King of Poland, lieutenant général.

=== 6th promotion (Versailles, 2 February 1728) ===
- Knights :
  - Louis Auguste de Bourbon (1700-1755), prince de Dombes, colonel général of the Swisses and Grisons.
  - Louis Charles de Bourbon (1701-1775), comte d'Eu, Grand master of the artillery of France.
  - Louis de Rouvroy, duc de Saint-Simon, pair de France, Grandee of Spain first class and ambassadeur extraordinaire in Spain.
  - Antoine Gaston de Roquelaure, duc de Roquelaure, marquis de Biran, marshal of France.
  - Yves, marquis d'Alègre and baron de Tourzel, marshal of France.
  - Louis, comte, then duc de Gramont, brigadier des armées du Roi, lieutenant-général and colonel of the regiment of the French Guards.

=== 7th promotion (Versailles, 16 May 1728) ===
- Knights :
  - Jacques-Henri de Lorraine, prince de Lixen, Grand master of the house of the Duke de Lorraine, brigadier des armées du Roi.
  - Alexandre de La Rochefoucauld, duc de la Roche-Guyon, pair de France, Grand master of the King's wardrobe and brigadier des armées du Roi.
  - Louis-Antoine-Armand, duc de Gramont, pair de France, lieutenant général, colonel of the French Guards.
  - François-Joachim-Bernard Potier, duc de Gesvres, pair de France, first gentleman of the King's Chamber.
  - Paul-François de Béthune, duc de Charost, pair de France, captain of the King's Life Guard and lieutenant général.
  - François, duc d'Harcourt, pair de France, captain of the King's Life Guard and lieutenant général of the comté de Bourgogne.
  - Réné Mans, sire de Froulai, comte de Tessé, grandee of Spain, lieutenant général, first squire of the Queen.
  - Louis-Armand de Brichanteau, marquis de Nangis, lieutenant-général, honorary knight of the Queen.

=== 8th promotion (Versailles, 1 January 1729) ===
- Knight :
  - Louis François Armand de Vignerot du Plessis, duc de Richelieu and Fronsac, first gentleman of the King's Chamber, pair and marshal of France.

=== 9th promotion (Seville, Spain, 25 April 1729) ===
- Knights :
  - Ferdinand, prince of Asturias, son of King Philip of Spain, later also King of Spain.
  - Charles, infante of Spain, Duke of Parma and Piacenza, hereditairy prince of Toscany, King of the Two Sicilies in 1735 and King of Spain in 1759.
  - José María Téllez-Girón, 7th Duke of Osuna, Grandee of Spain first class, ambassadeur extraordinaire in France.
  - Manuel de Benavides y Aragón, 1st Duke of Santisteban del Puerto, Grandee of Spain, representative of Spain at the Congress of Cambrai (1722-1725).
  - Alfonso Fernández Manrique de Lara, 1st Duke of Arco, Grandee of Spain, Knight of the Golden Fleece, grand and first Squire of the King of Spain.
  - Antonio del Giudice, 3rd duke of Giovinazzo, prince of Cellamare, grandee of Spain, Knight in the Order of Santiago, governor and captain général of Old Castile, grand Squire of the Queen of Spain, ambassadeur extraordinaire in France.

=== 10th promotion (Versailles, 2 February 1731) ===
- Knights :
  - Charles Eugène de Lévis-Charlus, duc de Lévis and pair de France, comte de Charlus and Saignes, lieutenant général.
  - Christian Louis de Montmorency-Luxembourg, prince de Tingry, comte souverain de Luxe, lieutenant général.
  - Alexandre-Magdeleine-Rosalie de Châtillon, baron d'Argenton, known as comte de Châtillon, grand bailli of Haguenau, lieutenant général.
  - Henri-Camille, marquis de Beringhen, de Châteauneuf and Uxelles, first Squire of the King.

=== 11th promotion (Versailles, 13 May 1731) ===
- Knights:
  - Jean-Baptiste de Durfort, duc de Duras, comte de Rozan, baron de Pujols, lieutenant général and later marshal of France.
  - François-Marie de Broglie, comte de Revel, baron de Ferrières, then duc de Broglie and marshal of France.
  - Philippe Charles de La Fare, marquis de la Fare, Knight in the Order of the Golden Fleece, Marshal General of France, lieutenant général in the province of Languedoc.

=== 12th promotion (Versailles, 1 January 1733) ===
- Prelate:
  - Melchior de Polignac, cardinal-priest of Santa Maria degli Angeli e dei Martiri in Rome, archbishop of Auch.
- Knight:
  - Louis François de Bourbon-Conti, prince de Conti, duc de Mercoeur, pair of France.

=== 13th promotion (Versailles, 24 May 1733) ===
- Prelates :
  - Armand Pierre de La Croix de Castries, archbishop of Albi.
  - Henri Oswald de La Tour d'Auvergne, des ducs de Bouillon, archbishop of Vienne, first Almoner of the King and later cardinal.

=== 14th promotion (Versailles, 1 January 1735) ===
- Knight :
  - Charles Louis Auguste Fouquet, duc de Belle-Isle, comte de Gisors, prince of the Holy Empire, Knight of the Golden Fleece, marshal of France and minister of War.

=== 15th promotion (Madrid, 22 March 1736) ===
- Knights :
  - Philip, infante of Spain, later Duke of Parma and Piacenza.
  - Álvaro Benavides Bazán, 7th Marquis of Santa Cruz, Grandee of Spain, Knight of the Golden Fleece, etc.

=== 16th promotion (Versailles, 20 May 1736) ===
- Knight :
  - Jean-Hercules de Rosset, marquis de Rocozel, baron de Pérignan, then duc de Fleury and pair de France.

=== 17th promotion (Versailles, 2 February 1737) ===
- Knights :
  - Francois-Louis de Neufville, duc de Villeroy, pair de France, captain of the Life Guards.
  - Charles-Armand de Gontaut, duc de Biron, pair and marshal of France.
  - Franciszek Maksymilian Ossoliński, prince of the Empire, before Grand Treasurier of Poland.
  - Antoine-Félix, marquis de Monti, lieutenant général, ambassadeur extraordinaire in Poland.

=== 18th promotion (Rome, 15 September 1737) ===
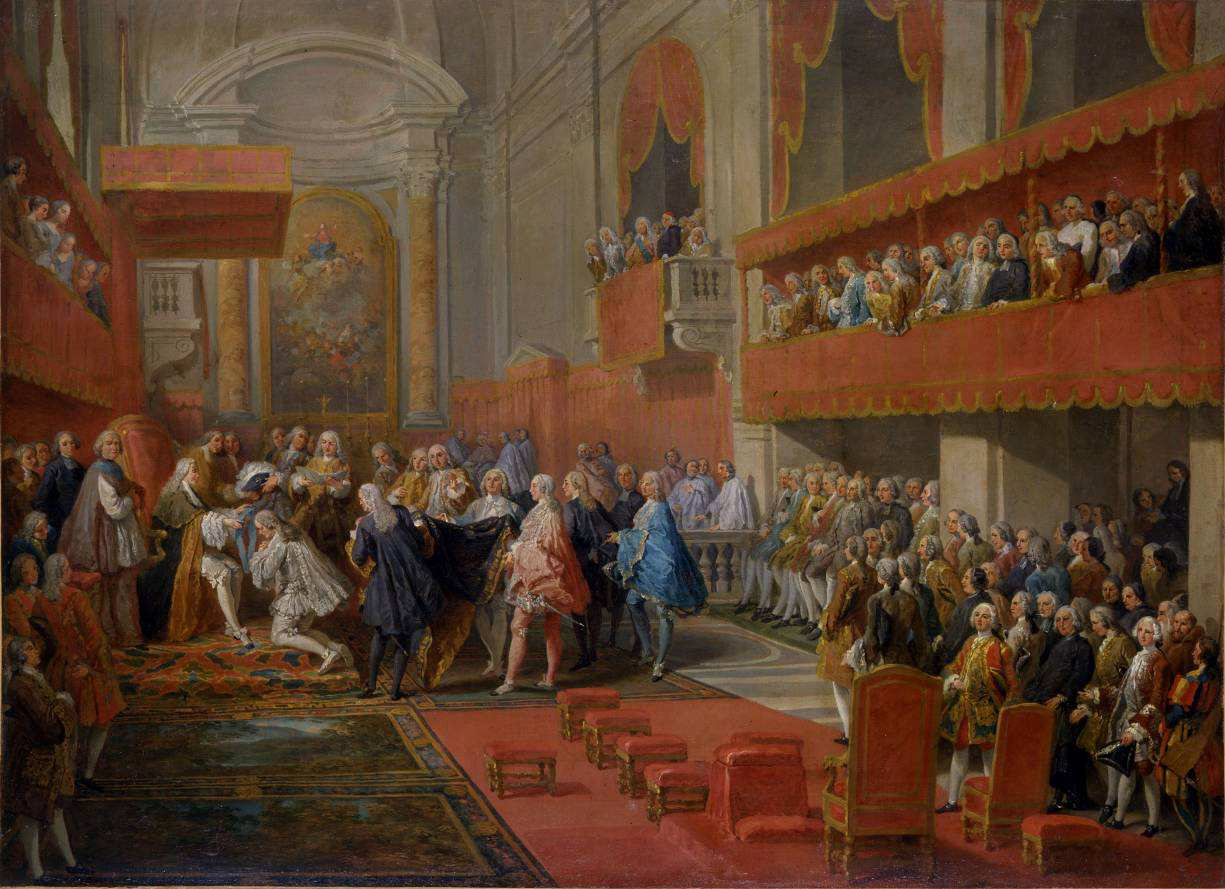
The Presentation of the Order of the Holy Spirit to Prince Vaini by the Duke of Saint-Aignan in the San Luigi dei Francesi church in Rome, 15 September 1737, Giovanni Paolo Pannini (1692–1765), around 1745, Musée des Beaux-Arts de Caen.

- Knights :
  - Jerôme Vaini, prince de Cantaloupe, duc de Selci.

=== 19th promotion (Versailles, 17 May 1739) ===
- Knights :
  - Jacques François de Chastenet de Puységur, comte de Chessy, marshal of France.
  - Claude-Théophile de Béziade, marquis d'Avarey-sur-Loire, lieutenant général, governor of Péronne.
  - Louis de Regnier, marquis de Guerchy, lieutenant général
  - Antoine de la Font, marquis de Savine, lieutenant général and director général of the cavalry.
  - François de Bricqueville, comte de la Luzerne, seigneur de Monfreville, lieutenant général, vice-amiral of the Flotte du Ponant.
  - Louis-Dominique de Cambis, marquis de Cambis-Velleron, lieutenant général, ambassador in England.
  - Jacques de Monceaux d'Auxy, marquis d'Auxy, colonel of the Royal-Comtois Regiment.

=== 20th promotion (Versailles, 1 January 1740) ===
- Knight :
  - Jaime Miguel de Guzmán de Avalos y Spinola, Marquis of la Mina, Duke of Palata and Prince of Masa, Knight of the Golden Fleece, ambassador of Spain to France.

=== 21st promotion (Versailles, 2 February 1740) ===
- Knight :
  - Gabriel-Jacques de Salignac de La Motte, marquis de Fénelon, lieutenant général, ambassador in the Netherlands.

=== 22nd promotion (Versailles, 5 June 1740) ===
- Knight :
  - Louis Philippe d'Orléans, duc de Chartres, then duc d'Orléans, first prince du sang and as such first pair de France.

=== 23rd promotion (Versailles, 2 February 1741) ===
- Knight :
  - Gaston-Charles-Pierre de Lévis de Lomagne, marquis de Mirepoix, Hereditary Marshal of the Faith, then marshal of France and captain of the Life Guards.

=== 24th promotion (Versailles, 2 February 1742) ===
- Prelates :
  - Frédéric Jérôme de La Rochefoucauld de Roye (1701-1757), archbishop of Bourges, then cardinal and Grand aumônier de France.
  - Gilbert de Montmorin de Saint-Herem, bishop and duke of Langres, pair de France.
- Knight :
  - Louis Jean Marie de Bourbon, duc de Penthièvre, Admiral of France and Grand Huntsman of France.

=== 25th promotion (Fontainebleau, 13 May 1742) ===
- Prelate :
  - Jean-Louis Des Balbes de Berton de Crillon, archbishop and primate of Narbonne.
- Knight :
  - Louis, Dauphin of France (1729-1765), dauphin de Viennois, only son of the King and heir to the throne.

=== 26th promotion (Versailles, 1 January 1743) ===
- Prelate :
  - Pierre Guérin de Tencin, cardinal, archbishop-count of Lyon, Primate of the Gauls, State minister.

=== 27th promotion (Versailles, 2 June 1743) ===
- Knight :
  - Jean de Gassion, chevalier marquis de Gassion and Alluye, lieutenant général.

=== 28th promotion (Versailles, 1 January 1744) ===
- Knights :
  - Jean-Paul-Thimoléon de Cossé, due de Brissac, pair and Grand panetier de France.
  - Charles-François-Frédéric de Montmorency-Luxembourg, duc de Luxembourg, Piney and Montmorency, pair and marshal of France, captain of the Life Guards.
  - Joseph-Marie de Boufflers, duc de Boufflers, pair de France, lieutenant général for the King in Flandres and Hainaut Province.
  - Louis Charles, marquis de La Mothe-Houdancourt, Grandee of Spain first class, honorary knight to the Queen, then marshal of France.
  - Louis-Antoine de Gontaut de Biron, duc de Biron, pair and marshal of France.
  - Daniel-François, comte de Gélas de Voisins d'Ambres, known as comte de Lautrec, lieutenant général, inspector général of the infantry, the marshal of France.
  - Jean-Antoine-François de Franquetot, comte de Coigny, colonel général of the dragoons.

=== 29th promotion (Versailles, 6 January 1745) ===
- Prelate :
  - Armand de Rohan, cardinal de Soubise, bishop and prince of Strasbourg, Grand Almoner of France.

=== 30th promotion (Versailles, 2 February 1745) ===
- Knights :
  - Louis-Marie-d'Aumont, duc d'Aumont, pair de France, first gentleman of the King's Chamber, then lieutenant général and governor of Boulonnais.
  - Guy Michel de Durfort de Lorges, duc de Randan, lieutenant général.
  - Charles-Louis de Montsaulnin, comte de Montal, lieutenant général.
  - Jean-Charles de Sennectaire ou Sennetaire, chevalier-marquis of Sennectaire and Brinon, lieutenant général, then marshal of France.
  - Henri-Louis de Choiseul, marquis de Meuze, lieutenant général.
  - Henri-Charles de Saulx, comte de Tavannes, marquis de Trichâteau, lieutenant général for the King in Bourgogne.

=== 31st promotion (Versailles, 1 January 1746) ===
- Knight :
  - Louis Riggio Saladino-Branciforti-Colonna, prince of Campo-Florido, Grandee of Spain first class, captain général of the Guards of the King of Spain, ambassador in France.

=== 32nd promotion (Versailles, 2 February 1746) ===
- Prelate :
  - Louis-Jacques Chapt de Rastignac, archbishop of Tours.
- Knights :
  - Nicolas-Joseph-Balthasar de Langlade, vicomte du Chayla, lieutenant général, director général of the cavalry.
  - Ulrich Frédéric Woldemar de Lowendal, lieutenant général, then marshal of France.
  - Pierre de Bérenger, comte de Charmes and Gua, lieutenant général.
  - Louis Charles César Le Tellier, comte d'Estrées, baron de Montmirail, inspector général of the cavalry, lieutenant général, then marshal of France.
  - Claude Annet d'Apchier, known as comte d'Apchier, lieutenant général.

=== 33rd promotion (Versailles, 1 January 1747) ===
- Knights :
  - Charles O'Brien, comte de Thomond, vicomte de Clare, Peer of the Kingdom of Ireland, lieutenant général, then marshal of France.
  - Jacques-François Milano Franco-Arragon, 2nd prince of Ardore and the Holy Empire, gentleman of the chamber of the King of the Two Sicilies and his ambassador in France.

=== 34th promotion (Versailles, 1 January 1748) ===
- Prelates :
  - Christophe de Beaumont du Repaire, archbishop of Paris, duc de Saint-Cloud and pair de France.
  - Nicolas de Saulx-Tavannes, archbishop of Rouen, pair de France, then cardinal and grand Almoner of France.
  - Abraham-Louis de Harcourt, marquis de Beuvron, abbot of the Signy Abbey and Saint-Taurin, former dean of the church of Paris.

=== 35th promotion (Versailles, 2 February 1748) ===
- Knights :
  - Charles-Philippe d'Albert, duc de Luynes, comte de Tours and Montfort-l'Amaury, pair de France.
  - Jean-Hector de Fay, marquis de La Tour-Maubourg, lieutenant général, inspector général of the infantry, then marshal of France.
  - François de Bulkeley, known as comte de Bulkeley, lieutenant général.
  - Henri François, comte de Ségur, lieutenant général, inspector général of the cavalry and dragoons.
  - Louis Philogène Brûlart de Sillery, marquis de Puissieux and Sillery, Secretary of State for foreign affairs.

=== 36th promotion (Versailles, 1 January 1749) ===
- Knight :
  - Alphonse-Marie-Louis, comte de Saint-Séverin d'Arragon, ministre plénipotentiaire for the King at the Congress of Aix-la-Chapelle (1748).

=== 37th promotion (Versailles, 2 February 1749) ===
- Knights :
  - Louis de Noailles, duc d'Ayen, marquis de Maintenon, marshal of France, captain of the 1st company of the King's Life Guards, governor of Roussillon.
  - Louis-Armand-François de La Rochefoucauld, duc d'Estissac, grand master of the King's wardrobe.
  - François-Marie de Villers la Faye, comte de Vaulgrenant, ministre plénipotentiaire in Dresden, ambassadeur extraordinaire in Spain.

=== 38th promotion (Versailles, 25 May 1749) ===
- Knights :
  - Louis César de La Baume Le Blanc, duc de La Vallière, pair and Grand Falconer of France.
  - Charles-François, marquis de Sassenage, honorary knight of madame la Dauphine.
  - Louis, comte de Mailly, lieutenant général, first Squire of madame la Dauphine.
  - Anne-Léon, baron de Montmorency, leader of his house, lieutenant général.
  - Louis de Talaru, marquis de Chalmazel, first master of the Queen's Chambers.
  - François-Louis le Tellier, comte de Rebellac, marquis de Souvré and Louvois, lieutenant général.

=== 39th promotion (Versailles, 17 May 1750) ===
- Knight :
  - Louis François Joseph de Bourbon-Conti, prince de Conti, comte de la Marche.

=== 40th promotion (Versailles, 2 February 1751) ===
- Knight :
  - Michel-Ferdinand d'Albert d'Ally, duc de Chaulnes, pair de France, lieutenant général, governor of Picardy and Artois.

=== 41st promotion (Versailles, 2 February 1752) ===
- Knight :
  - Louis V Joseph de Bourbon-Condé, prince de Condé.

=== 42nd promotion (Versailles, 21 May 1752) ===
- Knights :
  - Louis-Charles de Lorraine, comte de Brionne and Charny, Grand Squire of France.
  - Louis-Jules Mancini-Mazarini, duc de Nivernois, pair de France, Grandee of Spain first class, ambassadeur extraordinaire in Rome.

=== 43rd promotion (Versailles, 1 January 1753) ===
- Knight :
  - Emmanuel d'Hautefort, marquis d'Hautefort and Sarcelles, comte de Montignac, Marshal General of France, ambassadeur extraordinaire in the Germanic Empire.

=== 44th promotion (Versailles, 2 February 1753) ===
- Knights :
  - André-Hercule de Rosset, duc de Fleury, pair de France, lieutenant général, first gentleman of the King's Chamber.
  - Bufile-Hyacinthe-Toussaint de Brancas, des comtes de Forcalquier, comte de Céreste.
  - Paul-Gallucio de l'Hôpital, marquis de Châteauneuf-sur-Cher, lieutenant général, ambassadeur extraordinaire in Saint Petersburg, inspector général of the cavalry and dragoons, first Squire of Adélaïde de France.
  - Antoine-Paul-Jacques de Quélen, prince de Carency, comte de la Vauguyon, lieutenant général, governor of the King's children, first gentleman of the King's Chamber, Grand master of the King's wardrobe.
  - Louis de Conflans, marquis d'Armentières, marshal of France.
  - Pierre-Emmanuel, marquis de Crussol, Marshal General of France, ministre plénipotentiaire in Parma.

=== 45th promotion (Versailles, 10 June 1753) ===
- Prelates :
  - Charles Antoine de La Roche-Aymon, archbishop of Narbonne, then Reims, and in this capacity, first ecclesiastical peer, Grand Almoner of France and cardinal, in charge of the sheet of benefices.
  - Louis Constantin de Rohan, bishop and prince of Strasbourg, cardinal.
  - François-Claude de Beaufort-Montboissier-Canillac, auditor in Rome.

=== 46th promotion (Versailles, 2 February 1756) ===
- Knights :
  - Camille-Louis de Lorraine, known as prince Camille, sire de Pons, prince de Mortagne, etc., Marshal General of France, then lieutenant général.
  - Anne-Pierre, duc d'Harcourt, pair and marshal of France, lieutenant général of the province of Normandy.
  - Charles de Fitz-James, duc de Fitz-James-Warti, pair de France, lieutenant général.
  - Emmanuel Armand de Vignerot du Plessis, duc d'Aiguillon, pair de France, lieutenant général, commander-in-chief in Bretagne, minister and State secretary in the Foreign affairs and War departement.

=== 47th promotion (Versailles, 6 June 1756) ===
- Knights :
  - Jacques-Antoine, comte de S. Vital et de Fontanellato, marquis de Belleforte, etc., honorary knight to the infante duchess of Parma.
  - Józef Aleksander Jabłonowski, prince of the Empire, voivode of Novogrudok, grand sénéchal of the Duchy of Lithuania.

=== 48th promotion (Versailles, 1 January 1757) ===
- Knight :
  - François, des comtes de Baschi, comte de Baschi-Saint-Estève, ambassador for France in Portugal.

=== 49th promotion (Versailles, 2 February 1757) ===
- Knights :
  - Charles Juste de Beauvau-Craon, prince du Saint-Empire, Grandee of Spain first class, captain of the Life Guards, Marshal General of France.
  - Charles-Antoine-Armand de Gontault-Biron, duc de Gontault, lieutenant général .
  - Yves Marie Desmarets de Maillebois, known as comte de Maillebois, master of the King's wardrobe, lieutenant général in the province of Languedoc.
  - Armand, marquis de Béthune and Chabris, mestre de camp général of the light cavalry of France, then colonel général of the same cavalry.
  - Joseph-Henri d'Esparbès-de-Lussan-Bouchard, marquis d'Aubeterre, Marshal General of France, ambassador in Spain.
  - Charles-François de Broglie, known as comte de Broglie, ambassadeur extraordinaire for France in Poland, first colonel attaché to the grenadiers of France.

=== 50th promotion (Versailles, 29 May 1757) ===
- Knight :
  - Étienne François de Choiseul, duc de Choiseul, pair de France, Marshal General of France, ambassadeur extraordinaire in Rome and Vienna, Foreign Minister.

=== 51st promotion (Versailles, 14 May 1758) ===
- Prelate :
  - François-Joachim de Pierre de Bernis, cardinal, archbishop of Albi, Foreign Minister.

=== 52nd promotion (Versailles, 1 January 1759) ===
- Prelate :
  - Paul d'Albert de Luynes, cardinal, archbishop of Sens, Primate of the Gauls and Germany.

=== 53rd promotion (Versailles, 2 February 1759) ===
- Prelate :
  - Étienne-René Potier de Gesvres, cardinal, bishop and count of Beauvais, pair de France.
- Knights :
  - Marie-Charles-Louis d'Albert, duc de Luynes and Chevreuse, pair de France, colonel général of the dragoons, governor and lieutenant général in Paris.
  - Louis Georges Érasme de Contades, marquis de Contades, seigneur de la Verne, Montgeoffroy and La Roche-Thibaut, Colonel of the Flanders infantry regiment, Brigadier des armées du roi, Maréchal de camp, lieutenant général, then inspector général of the infantry in 1745, Marshal of France in 1758, chevalier des ordres du Roy and governor of Strasbourg.
  - Louis-Robert Mallet de Graville, dit comte de Graville, comte de Chamilly, lieutenant général, inspector général of the cavalry and the dragoons, commander-in-chief in the province of Roussillon, Conflans and Cerdagne.
  - François-Charles, comte de Rochechouart, marquis de Faudoas, lieutenant général, governor of Orléans and the Orléanais, ministre plénipotentiaire at the court of Infante Don Philippe, Duke of Parma.
  - Claude-Louis-François Regnier, comte de Guerchy, lieutenant général.
  - Emmanuel de Croÿ, prince du Saint-Empire, Marshal General of France, the King's commander in Artois, Picardy, Calaisis and Boulonnais.
  - Hyacinthe-Gaëtan de Lannion, known as comte de Lannion, baron de Malestroit, pair de Bretagne, life-time president of the States of Bretagne, governor and lieutenant général of the island of Minorca.

=== 54th promotion (18 May 1760) ===
- Knight :
  - Don Charles Antoine de Bourbon, prince of Asturias, eldest son of King Charles III, future King Charles IV of Spain.

=== 55th promotion (21 July 1760) ===
- Knight :
  - Don Luis Antonio, infante of Spain, third son of King Philip V and Elisabeth Farnese.

=== 56th promotion (22 July 1760) ===
- Knights :
  - Felipe Portocarrero, comte de Montijo, gentleman of the chamber of the King of Spain.
  - Fernando de Silva y Álvarez de Toledo, Duke of Alba.

=== 57th promotion (8 September 1760) ===
- Knight :
  - Ferdinand IV, King of the Two Sicilies.

=== 58th promotion (Versailles, 10 May 1761) ===
- Prelate :
  - Louis-Sextius de Jarente de La Bruyère, bishop of Orléans.

=== 59th promotion (Versailles, 1 January 1762) ===
- Knight :
  - César Gabriel de Choiseul-Praslin, duc de Praslin, pair de France, ambassador to the Germanic Emperor, minister of Foreign Affairs.

=== 60th promotion (Versailles, 2 February 1762) ===
- Knights :
  - Victor-François, duc de Broglie, marshal of France.
  - Jerónimo Grimaldi, 1st Duke of Grimaldi, ambassadeur extraordinaire of Spain to France.

=== 61st promotion (Versailles, 30 May 1762) ===
- Prelate :
  - Jean-François-Joseph de Rochechouart, bishop and duke of Laon, and in this capacity, second ecclesiastical peer of the Kingdom, cardinal.
- Knights :
  - Louis Philippe d'Orléans, duc de Chartres.
  - Charles Eugène Gabriel de La Croix de Castries, marquis de Castries, marshal of France, minister and State Secretary of the departement of the Navy, commandant général and inspector of the gendarmerie corps.

=== 62nd promotion (25 August 1762) ===
- Knight :
  - Don Ferdinand, infante of Spain, future Duke of Parma.

=== 63rd promotion (Versailles, 2 February 1763) ===
- Knight :
  - Louis Alexandre de Bourbon, prince de Lamballe.

=== 64th promotion (Versailles, 2 February 1764) ===
- Knights :
  - Charles-Gaspar-Michel, comte de Saulx-Tavannes, lieutenant général in the government of the Duchy of Burgundy, honorary Knight to the Queen.
  - Louis Nicolas Victor de Félix d'Ollières, comte du Muy, marshal of France, minister and State Secretary of the departement of War.

=== 65th promotion (Versailles, 10 June 1764) ===
- Knight :
  - Louis-Marie-Florent de Lomont, duc du Châtelet, ambassador to the Germanic Emperor and Empress-Queen (Austria).

=== 66th promotion (Versailles, 1 January 1767) ===
- Knight :
  - Charles Henri, comte d'Estaing, vice-admiral of France, lieutenant général.

=== 67th promotion (2 February 1767) ===
- Knights :
  - Louis-Auguste, Dauphin de France, future King of France (Louis XVI).
  - Louis-Stanislas-Xavier de France, comte de Provence, future King of France (Louis XVIII).
  - Emmanuel-Félicité de Durfort, duc de Duras, pair and marshal of France, first gentleman of the King's Chamber.
  - Joaquín Atanasio Pignatelli de Aragón y Moncayo, conde de Fuentes, Grandee of Spain first class, ambassador of Spain to France.

=== 68th promotion (Versailles, 7 June 1767) ===
- Knights :
  - Philippe de Noailles, duc de Mouchy, marshal of France, Grandee of Spain first class.
  - Gabriel Marie de Talleyrand, comte de Périgord, Grandee of Spain first class, Marshal General of France, governor and lieutenant général of the province of Haut et Bas Berry.
  - Louis-Paul, marquis de Brancas, Grandee of Spain first class, lieutenant général, lieutenant général in the government of Provence.
  - Claude Guillaume Testu de Balincourt, marquis de Balincourt, marshal of France.
  - Charles-François-Christian de Montmorency-Luxembourg, prince de Tingry, lieutenant général, captain of the Life Guardes of the King.
  - Charles-Léonard de Baylens, marquis de Poyanne, lieutenant général, mestre-de-camp, inspector and commander of the carabiniers corps.
  - Emmanuel-Louis-Auguste, comte de Pons-Saint-Maurice, lieutenant général, first gentleman of the duc d'Orléans.
  - Philippe Henri de Ségur, marquis de Ségur, then marshal of France and secretary of State of War.

=== 69th promotion (1 January 1768) ===
- Knight :
  - Jules-César Barberini, prince de Palestrina.

=== 70th promotion (22 May 1768) ===
- Knight :
  - Don Francisco Javier, infante of Spain (1757-1771).

=== 71st promotion (Versailles, 1 January 1771) ===
- Prelate :
  - Jean-Joseph Chapelle de Jumillac-Saint-Jean, archbishop of Arles.
- Knight :
  - Charles-Philippe de France, comte d'Artois, future King of France (Charles X).

=== 72nd promotion (Versailles, 1 January 1773) ===
- Knights :
  - Louis VI Henri de Bourbon-Condé, duc de Bourbon.
  - Gabriel Louis François de Neufville de Villeroy, duc de Villeroy and Retz, pair de France, captain of the 1st French company of the King's Life Guards, lieutenant général, governor of Lyon, and the provinces of Lyonnais, Forez and Beaujolais.
  - Louis Potier de Gesvres, duc de Tresmes, pair de France, lieutenant général, governor and lieutenant général of the province of Île-de-France.
  - Jean-Baptiste-Joachim Colbert, marquis de Croissy, lieutenant général.
  - Louis II du Bouchet de Sourches, marquis de Sourches, lieutenant général, Grand Prevost of France.
  - Jean-Baptiste-François, marquis de Montmorin de Saint-Hérem, lieutenant général.

=== During the reign of Louis XV, Knights and commanders appointed and died without having been received ===
==== 1724 ====
- Prelate :
  - Filippo Antonio Gualterio, cardinal, papal nuncio.
- Knights :
  - Antoine Grimaldi, prince de Monaco, duc de Valentinois, pair de France.
  - Charles Auguste de Goyon de Matignon, marshal de France (In view of his great age, the King appointed his son, the Marquis de Matignon, in his place, who was received on 1 January 1725).
  - Antonio Gaspar de Moscoso Osorio y Aragón, 8th Count of Altamira.
  - Francisco María Spínola y Spínola, 3rd Duke of San Pedro de Galatino, Grandee of Spain.

==== 1725 ====
- Stanislas Leszczyński, King of Poland.

==== 1731 ====
- Conrad-Alexandre, comte de Rottembourg.

==== 1745 ====
- Francesco III d'Este, Duke of Modena.

==== 1746 ====
- Cristóbal Gregorio Portocarrero, 5th Count of Montijo, Grandee of Spain, marshal of Castille, etc.
- Annibal Déodat, marquis de Scotti.

==== 1748 ====
- Anne-Louis de Thiard, marquis de Bissy, mestre-de-camp général of the cavalry, named chevalier des Ordres du Roi in an extraordinary session called by the king at Choisy on 4 May 1748. This appointment was cancelled when news arrived that he had died of wounds sustained during the Siege of Maastricht, however by a brêvet on 17 May 1748 his family was granted permission to add the honour of the order to their coat of arms.

==== 1749 ====
- Marc-Antoine Front de Beaupoil de Saint-Aulaire, marquis de Lanmary, etc., ambassador in Sweden. Receiving appointment to the order on 1 January 1749, he died in Stockholm before he could be formerly enrolled. His family obtained a brêvet on 25 May of that year to allow them to display the honour in their coat of arms.
- Fernando de Silva y Álvarez de Toledo, Duke of Huescar, etc., Spanish ambassador to France between 1746 and 1749

==== 1750 ====
- Stanislas Prus Jablonowski, prince of the Holy Empire, palatine of Rava, etc.

==== 1756 ====
- Louis-Eugène, prince of Württemberg

==== 1757 ====
- Pierre-Paul d'Ossuna, marquis of Ossuna

==== 1760 ====
- César Gabriel de Choiseul-Praslin, named comte de Choiseul, appointed on 1 January 1760, admitted on 2 February.

==== 1761 ====
- Don Gabriel, infante of Spain.

==== 1767 ====
- Charles Henri, comte d'Estaing, vice-admiral of France, lieutenant général.
- Don Antonio, infante of Spain

==== 1768 ====
- Jules-César Barberini, prince of Palestrina.
- Don Francisco Javier, infante of Spain (1757-1771).

== Under Louis XVI ==
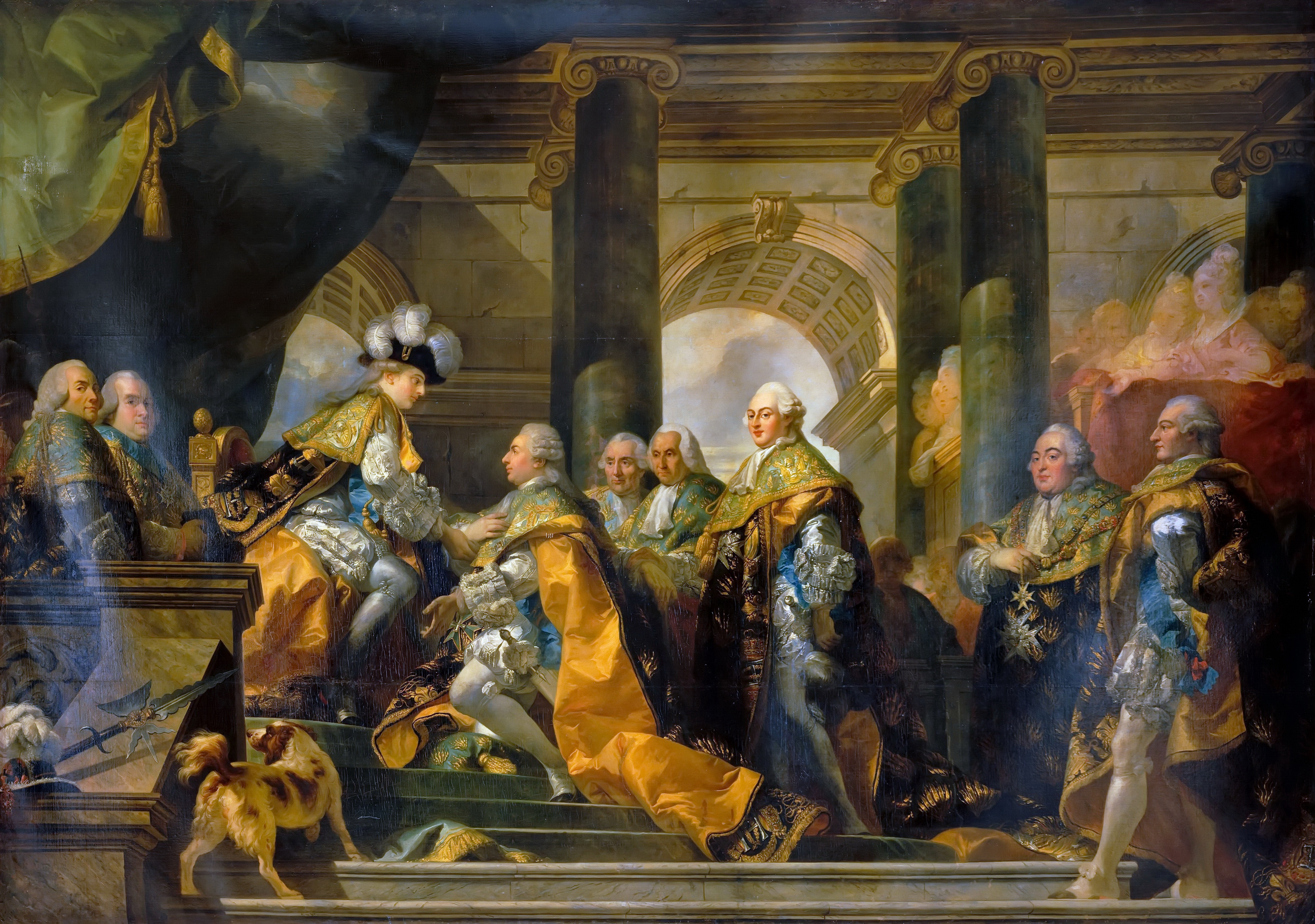
Louis XVI receives in Reims the homage of the Knights of the Holy Spirit, 13 June 1775, Gabriel-François Doyen (1726–1806), vers 1775, Musée national des châteaux de Versailles et de Trianon.

The sixth head and sovereign Grand maître de l'ordre du Saint-Esprit, Louis XVI received the collar of l'Ordre on 2 February 1767, seven years before becoming king.

=== 1st promotion (Versailles, 1 January 1776) ===
- Knights :
  - Jean-Louis-Roger de Rochechouart, marquis de Rochechouart.
  - Antoine Louis François de La Roche-Aymon, marquis de La Roche-Aymon.
  - Charles Daniel de Talleyrand-Périgord, comte de Talleyrand-Périgord.
  - Jean François de La Rochefoucauld, vicomte de La Rochefoucauld, marquis de Surgères, seigneur de Doudeauville.
  - Jean François de Talaru, vicomte de Talaru, seigneur de Montpeyroux.
- Commanders :
  - Jean-Gilles du Coëtlosquet, bishop of Limoges.
  - Arthur Richard Dillon, bishop of Evreux, then arch bishop of Toulouse, then archbishop of Narbonne.

=== 2nd promotion (26 may 1776) ===
- Knights :
  - François Emmanuel de Crussol, comte de Crussol, then duc d'Uzès and pair de France, prince de Soyons and marquis de Montsalés.
  - Louis Hercule Timoléon de Cossé, marquis de Cossé (known as de Brissac), then duc de Brissac and pair de France, captain-colonel of the Swiss Guards and Grand Panetier of France.
  - René Mans de Froulay, marquis de Tessé and Lavardin.
  - Augustin-Joseph de Mailly, comte de Mailly, marquis d'Haucourt, marshal of France.
  - Philippe Claude de Montboissier-Beaufort-Canillac, comte de Montboissier.
  - François Gaston de Lévis, duc de Lévis, marshal of France.
  - Anne-François d'Harcourt, duc de Beuvron.
  - Jacques Aimeric Joseph de Durfort, duc de Civrac.
  - Louis Charles Auguste Le Tonnelier, baron de Breteuil.

=== 3rd Promotion (1 January 1777) ===
- Knights :
  - Charles-Eugène de Lorraine, prince de Lambesc, comte de Brionne, duc d'Elbeuf and pair de France, Grand Squire of France.
  - Marie François Henri de Franquetot, duc de Coigny and pair de France, marquis de Bordage and La Moussaye, colonel général of the Dragoons and marshal of France.

=== 4th Promotion (2 February 1777) ===
- Knights :
  - Louis Alexandre Céleste d'Aumont, duc d'Aumont, pair de France.
  - Louis Melchior Armand de Polignac, vicomte de Polignac, marquis de Chalencon.
  - Pierre Raymond de Bérenger, marquis de Bérenger, comte de Gua.

=== 5th Promotion (9 November 1777) ===
- Commander :
  - Louis René Édouard de Rohan-Guéménée, cardinal, bishop-prince of Strasbourg, Grand Almoner of France.

=== 6th Promotion du (1 January 1778) ===
- Commander :
  - Pierre Augustin Bernardin de Rosset de Rocozels de Fleury, bishop of Chartres, grand almoner of the Queen.

=== 7th Promotion (2 February 1778) ===
- Knight :
  - Pierre Paul d'Ossun, seigneur de Saint-Luc and Bartrès, French Ambassador to Spain.

=== 8th Promotion (9 June 1778) ===
- Knights :
  - Charles François Elzéar de Vogüe, marquis de Vogüe, comte de Montlaur, baron d'Aubenas.
  - Alexandre Marie Léonor de Saint-Mauris de Montbarrey, prince de Montbarrey and of the Holy Empire.
  - Louis Bruno de Boisgelin, comte de Boisgelin, marquis de Cucé, baron de La Rochebernard.

=== 9th Promotion (1 January 1780) ===
- Commander :
  - Jean-Armand de Bessuéjouls Roquelaure, archbishop of Malines, abbot In commendam of Saint-Germer.

=== 10th Promotion (14 may 1780) ===
- Commander :
  - Dominique de La Rochefoucauld, archbishop of Albi, abbot of Cluny, then archbishop of Rouen, abbot of Fécamp, cardinal.

=== 11th Promotion (1 January 1781) ===
- Knight :
  - Ercole III d'Este, Duke of Modena, Reggio and La Mirandola, prince of Carpi and Corregio. Died before being received.

=== 12th Promotion (2 February 1782) ===
- Commander :
  - Étienne-Charles de Loménie de Brienne, bishop of Condom, then archbishop of Toulouse, then archbishop of Sens, cardinal.

=== 13th Promotion (1 January 1784) ===
- Knights :
  - Maximilien Antoine Armand de Béthune, duc de Sully and pair de France, sovereign prince of Henrichemont and Boisbelle, marquis de Lens, comte de Béthune and Montgommery, baron of La Chapelle d'Aiguillon and Mêle-sur-Sarthe.
  - Paul François de Quelen de La Vauguyon, duc de La Vauguyon and pair de France, prince de Carency.
  - Marie Louis Caillebot, marquis de La Salle, seigneur de Montpinçon.
  - Louis Auguste Augustin d'Affry, comte d'Affry, seigneur de Saint-Barthélémy and Brétigny.
  - Charles Claude Andrault, marquis de Maulévrier-Langeron.
  - Luc Urbain du Bouëxic, comte de Guichen.
  - Auguste Louis Hennequin, marquis d'Ecquevilly, seigneur de La Motte-Verigny, Gouzon, Presles.
  - Jean-Baptiste Donatien de Vimeur, comte de Rochambeau, marshal of France.
  - Louis Antoine Auguste de Rohan-Chabot, duc de Chabot, vicomte de Bignan, baron de Kerguehéneuc.
  - François Claude Amour de Bouillé du Chariol, « marquis » de Bouillet, seigneur de Saint-Giron, baron d'Alleret.
  - Adrien Louis de Bonnières, duc de Guines.
  - Charles Léopold de Jaucourt, seigneur de Chazelles, « marquis » de Jaucourt.
  - Jean Baptiste Charles François de Clermont d'Amboise, marquis de Reynel.
  - Anne-Pierre de Montesquiou, seigneur de Pont-Saint-Pierre, « marquis » de Montesquiou-Fezensac.
  - Charles François Gaspard Fidèle de Vintimille, seigneur de Figanières and Vidauban, « marquis » de Vintimille.
  - Charles François Casimir de Saulx, duc de Tavannes.
  - Louis François Marie de Pérusse, comte des Cars and Saint-Bonnet.
  - Joseph Hyacinthe François de Paule Rigaud, comte de Vaudreuil and pair de France, Grand Falconer of France.
  - Valentin Ladislas Esterhazy de Galantha, comte de Grodeck and Magnate of Hungary.
  - Louis Étienne François, comte de Damas-Crux.
  - Armand Marc de Montmorin, comte de Saint-Hérem.
  - Alexandre Charles Emmanuel de Crussol-Florensac, baron de Crussol and pair de France, bailiff of the Order of Malta.

=== 14th Promotion (30 may 1784) ===
- Knights :
  - François Alexandre Frédéric de La Rochefoucauld-Liancourt, duc de La Rochefoucauld and pair de France.
  - Jules Charles Henri de Clermont-Tonnerre, duc de Clermont-Tonnerre and pair de France.
  - Antoine Marie d'Apchon, comte de Saint-Germain, baron de Corgenon.
  - Pierre André de Suffren de Saint-Tropez, bailiff of the Order of Malta, vice-admiral of France.

=== 15th Promotion (1 January 1785) ===
- Commander :
  - Yves-Alexandre de Marbeuf, canon-count of Lyon, then bishop of Autun, then archbishop of Lyon.

=== 16th Promotion (2 February 1785) ===
- Knight :
  - François-Henri d'Harcourt, duc d'Harcourt and pair de France, marquis de Saint-Bris and baron de Chitry.

=== 17th Promotion (2 February 1786) ===
- Knights :
  - Anne Ferdinand François de Croÿ, duc de Croÿ, prince de Solre and of the Holy Empire.
  - Anne Louis Alexandre de Montmorency, prince de Robecq, Grandee of Spain.
  - Jacques Philippe de Choiseul, duc de Stainville, marshal of France.
  - Joseph Louis Bernard de Cléron, comte d'Haussonville, seigneur de Bazarne, Grand Louvetier de France.
  - Esprit François Henri de Castellane.
  - Augustin Gabriel de Franquetot, comte de Coigny.

=== 18th Promotion (11 June 1786) ===
- Commander :
  - Louis-Joseph de Montmorency-Laval, cardinal, prince-bishop of Metz, grand almoner of France.

=== 19th Promotion (12 November 1786) ===
- Knight :
  - Louis de Bourbon, infante of Spain, hereditary prince of Parma, then King of Etruria.

=== 20th Promotion (27 may 1787) ===
- Knight :
  - Louis Antoine d'Artois, Duke of Angoulême, then Dauphin de France, Pretender King of France under then name of Louis XIX.

=== 21st Promotion (2 February 1788) ===
- Knight :
  - Louis Antoine Henri de Bourbon-Condé, duc d'Enghien.

=== 22nd Promotion (1 January 1789) ===
- Knights :
  - Louis Marie Athanase de Loménie, comte de Brienne.
  - Anne Paul Emmanuel Sigismond de Montmorency-Luxembourg.

=== 23rd Promotion (2 February 1789) ===
- Knight :
  - Louis Philippe d'Orléans, Duke of Chartres, then of Orléans, later King of France as Louis-Philippe I.

=== 24th Promotion (31 may 1789) ===
- Knight :
  - Charles Ferdinand d'Artois, duc de Berry.
  - Henri Charles Gabriel de Thiard de Bissy.

== Under Louis XVII ==
The unfortunate child, son of Louis XVI, reigned from behind the bars of the Temple from 21 January 1793 to 8 June 1795 and is not known to have received the collar of the Ordre du Saint-Esprit as this customarily only conferred on prince's after receiving their first communion.Given the royalists recognised him as king he is considered among them to be the seventh head and sovereign Grand Maître de l'Ordre du Saint-Esprit.

== Under Louis XVIII ==
The eighth head and sovereign Grand Maître de l'Ordre du Saint-Esprit Louis XVIII received the collar of the Order on 7 June 1767. For the knights of Saint-Esprit, the republic, consulate and empire never existed and the reign of Louis XVIII began on 8 June 1795 upon the death of the young king, his nephew, and continued without interruption until 1824.

=== First promotion (1808) ===
- Commandeur :
  - Alexandre Angélique de Talleyrand-Périgord, archbishop-duke of Reims, duke and pair, Grand Almoner of France, then archbishop of Paris.

Monseigneur de Talleyrand-Périgord, who was part of the Council of King Louis XVIII and who had followed this prince to Germany and from there to England, was appointed in 1808 Grand Almoner of France and Prelate Knight of the Order of the Holy Spirit, in the death of Cardinal de Montmorency.

=== Second promotion (1810) ===
- Knights :
  - Francis, Hereditary Prince of the Two Sicilies, later King Francis I.
  - Leopold, Prince of Salerno, brother of the previous.

=== Third promotion (1811) ===
- Knights :
  - George Augustus Frederick, prince of Wales, regent of the United Kingdom, later King George IV.
  - Prince Frederick, Duke of York and Albany, brother of the previous.
  - William Henry, Duke of Clarence, brother of the previous, later King William IV.
  - Ferdinand VII, King of Spain.
  - Infante Carlos María Isidro of Spain (don Carlos), brother of the previous.

=== Fourth promotion (1815) ===
- Knights :
  - Francis I, Emperor of Austria.
  - Alexander I, Emperor of Russia.
  - Konstantin Pavlovich of Russia, Grand Duke, brother of the Emperor.
  - Michael Pavlovich of Russia, Grand Duke, brother of the Emperor.
  - Frederick William III, King of Prussia.
  - Arthur Wellesley, 1st Duke of Wellington, prince of Waterloo, etc., Peer of England.

=== Fifth promotion (1816) ===
- Knights :
  - Ferdinand Charles Leopold, Hereditary Prince and Archduke of Austria, later Emperor Ferdinand I.
  - Karl Philipp, Prince of Schwarzenberg, Duke of Krumau, Austrian Fieldmarshal.
  - Don Carlos-Luis, infante of Spain, later Duke of Parma.
  - Louis-Aloysius, prince of Hohenlohe-Bartenstein, lieutenant général, pair and Marshal of France.

=== Sixth promotion (1818) ===
- Knights :
  - Frederick VI, King of Denmark.
  - Armand-Emmanuel-Sophie-Septimanie de Vignerot du Plessis-Richelieu, duc de Richelieu, pair de France, State minister, president of the council.

=== Seventh promotion (Paris, 30 September 1820) ===
- Prelates :
  - Louis-François, cardinal de Bausset, duke and pair de France.
  - Charles François d'Aviau du Bois de Sanzay, archbishop of Bordeaux.
  - François-Xavier-Marc-Antoine, abbot-duke of Montesquiou-Fézensac, pair de France.
  - César-Guillaume de La Luzerne, cardinal
- Knights :
  - Charles Maurice de Talleyrand-Périgord, prince de Talleyrand-Périgord, pair and Grand Chamberlain of France.
  - Charles-Emmanuel-Sigismond de Montmorency, duc de Luxembourg, pair de France, lieutenant général.
  - Antoine-Louis-Marie, duc de Gramont, pair de France, lieutenant général, captain of the 2nd company of the Life Guards.
  - Louis-Marie-Céleste, duc d'Aumont, pair de France.
  - Anne-Adrien-Pierre de Montmorency, duc de Laval-Montmorency, pair de France, grandee of Spain first class, Knight of the Golden Fleece, lieutenant général.
  - Amédée-Bretagne-Malo de Durfort, duc de Duras, pair de France, maréchal de camp.
  - Charles-Arthur-Jean-Tristan-Languedoc de Noailles, duc de Mouchy, prince de Poix, pair de France, captain of the Life Guards, Knight of the Golden Fleece.
  - Pierre-Marc-Gaston, duc de Lévis, pair de France, maréchal de camp, one of the 40 member of the Académie française.
  - Armand-Louis, duc de Serent, pair de France, lieutenant général.
  - Émerich-Joseph-Wolfgang-Héribert, duc de Dalberg, pair de France, State minister.
  - Bon Adrien Jeannot de Moncey, duc de Conégliano, pair and marshal of France.
  - Claude-Victor Perrin, duc de Bellune, pair and marshal of France.
  - Jacques-Étienne-Joseph-Alexandre Macdonald, duc de Tarente, pair and marshal of France, Grand Chancellor of the Légion d'honneur.
  - Nicolas Oudinot, duc de Reggio, pair and marshal of France.
  - Auguste Frédéric Louis Viesse de Marmont, duc de Raguse, pair and marshal of France.
  - Louis Gabriel Suchet, duc d'Albuféra, pair and marshal of France.
  - Claude-Louis, duc de La Châtre, pair de France, lieutenant général.
  - Claude Antoine de Bésiade, duc d'Avaray, pair de France, lieutenant général.
  - Élie, duc Decazes, pair de France, Prime Minister of France.
  - Charles-Joseph-Hyacinthe du Houx, comte then marquis de Vioménil, pair and marshal of France.
  - Marie-Victor-Nicolas de Fay, marquis de la Tour-Maubourg, pair de France, minister of War.
  - Jean-Charles-François de Nettancourt Hannouville, marquis Vaubecourt, lieutenant général.
  - Jean-Joseph-Paul-Augustin, marquis Dessole, pair de France, lieutenant général.
  - Charles François de Riffardeau, marquis puis duc de Rivière, pair de France, lieutenant général, ambassador in Constantinople.
  - Victor-Louis-Charles de Riquet, marquis puis duc de Caraman, pair de France, ambassador in Vienna.
  - Pierre-Louis-Jean-Casimir, duc de Blacas, pair de France, ambassador in Rome.
  - Joseph-Henri-Joachim, vicomte Lainé, pair de France, State minister.
  - Hercule, comte de Serre, ambassador in Naples.
  - Étienne-Denis, baron Pasquier, pair de France, Minister of Justice, Keeper of the Seals, then Duke and Chancellor of France, one of the 40 member of the Académie française.
  - François-Nicolas-Pierre de Pérusse, comte then duc d'Escars, pair de France.
  - Pierre Riel de Beurnonville, pair and marshal of France.

=== Eighth promotion (1821) ===
- Prélats :
  - Anne-Louis-Henri, cardinal-duc de la Fare, archbishop of Sens, pair de France.
  - Gustave-Maximilien-Just, cardinal-prince de Croy, archbishop of Rouen, Grand Almoner of France.
- Knights :
  - Don Fabrizio Ruffo, prince de Castel-Cicala, ambassador of the Two Sicilies.
  - Joseph-François-Louis-Charles de Damas, comte, then duc de Damas d'Antigny, pair de France.
  - Ferdinando Carlo, duc de Noto, eldest son of Francis I of the Two Sicilies, later King Ferdinand II of the Two Sicilies.
  - Hélie-Charles de Talleyrand-Périgord, prince-duc de Chalais, pair de France, Grandee of Spain First class, etc...

=== Ninth promotion (1823) ===
- Knights :
  - John VI, King of Portugal.
  - Don Pedro de Alcantara, prince royal of Portugal, regent and Emperor of Brazil.
  - Don Miguel, infante of Portugal, brother of the previous.
  - Jacques-Alexandre-Bernard Law, marquis de Lauriston, pair and marshal of France.
  - Don José Miguel de Carvajal, duke of San Carlos, Grandee of Spain first class, ambassador in France.
  - Joseph, comte de Villèle, minister-president of the council, pair de France, Knight of the Golden Fleece, etc.

=== Tenth promotion (5 February 1824) ===
- Knights :
  - Archduke Franz Karl of Austria, third son of Emperor Francis I.
  - Alexandere, Grand Duke of Russia, later Emperor Alexander II of Russia.
  - Charles Albert, prince de Carignan, later King Charles Albert of Sardinia.
  - Frederick William, prince royal of Prussia, later King Frederick William IV of Prussia.
  - Charles-Robert, comte de Nesselrode, vice-Chancellor of the Russian Empire.
  - François-René-Auguste, vicomte de Chateaubriand, pair de France, Knight of the Golden Fleece, one of the 40 member of the Académie française, etc.
  - Ambroise-Polycarpe de La Rochefoucauld, duc de Doudeauville, pair de France, Grandee of Spain first class, etc.
  - Étienne-Charles, duc de Damas-Crux, lieutenant général, pair de France, first gentlemen of M. le Dauphin, etc.
  - Louis Justin, marquis de Talaru, pair de France, ambassador in Madrid, Knight of the Golden Fleece, etc.

== Under Charles X ==
The ninth head and sovereign Grand maître de l'Ordre du Saint-Esprit, Charles X received the collar of l'Ordre on 1^{er} January 1771.

=== First promotion (Reims, 30 May 1825) ===
Promotion's made on the occasion of the coronation.

- Prelates :
  - Anne-Antoine-Jules, cardinal-duc de Clermont-Tonnerre, archbishop of Toulouse, pair de France.
  - Jean-Baptiste-Marie-Anne-Antoine, cardinal-duc de Latil, archbishop of Reims, pair de France.
- Knights :
  - Clément-Venceslas-Népomucène-Lothaire, prince de Metternich-Wineburg, Chancellor of the Crown, House and State of Austria.
  - Ferdinand-Philippe-Louis-Charles-Henri d'Orléans, duc de Chartres, prince royal and duc d'Orléans in 1830.
  - Marie-François-Emmanuel de Crussol, duc d'Uzès, pair de France, lieutenant général.
  - Charles Marie Paul André d'Albert de Luynes, duc de Chevreuse, pair de France.
  - Augustin-Marie-Paul-Pétronille-Timoléon, duc de Brissac, pair de France.
  - Casimir-Louis-Victurnien de Rochechouart, duc de Mortemart, pair de France, captain-colonel of the Swiss Guards, lieutenant général, etc.
  - Édouard, duc de Fitz-James, pair de France, first gentleman of the chamber of Monsieur until 1824.
  - Jean-Laurent de Durfort-Civrac, comte puis duc de Lorges, pair de France, lieutenant général.
  - Armand XXIV Jules Marie Héraclius, duc de Polignac, pair de France, maréchal de camp.
  - Charles François Armand de Maillé deLa Tour-Landry, duc de Maillé, pair de France, first aide de camp of the King.
  - Armand Charles Augustin de La Croix, duc de Castries, pair de France, lieutenant général.
  - Raimond-Jacques-Marie, duc de Narbonne-Pelet, pair de France, State minister.
  - Jean-Baptiste, comte Jourdan, pair and marshal of France.
  - Nicolas Jean-de-Dieu Soult, duc de Dalmatie, pair and marshal of France.
  - Louis-François Chamillart, marquis de la Suze, pair de France.
  - Henri Evrard, marquis de Dreux-Brézé, pair and Grand master of the ceremonies of France.
  - Claude-Emmanuel de Pastoret, pair de France, member of the institute.
  - Auguste-Pierre-Marie Ferron, comte de La Ferronays, pair de France, ambassador in Russia, etc.
  - Antoine-Jean, vicomte d'Agoult, pair de France, first squire of Madame la Dauphine.
  - Jean Thérèse de Beaumont d'Autichamp, governor of the Louvre.
  - Auguste Ravez, president of the Chamber of Deputies, State councillor.
  - Just, comte de Noailles.

=== Second promotion (Paris, 14 May 1826) ===
- Knights :
  - Charles Ferdinand, Prince of Capua (1811-1862), Prince of Capua, son of Ferdinand I, King of Naples.
  - Prince Leopold, Count of Syracuse, brother of the previous.
  - Charles Bretagne Marie de La Trémoille, duc de la Trémoille, prince de Tarente, pair de France.
  - Emmanuel Marie Maximilien de Croÿ-Solre, prince de Solre, captain of the 1st company of the King's Life Guard, then pair de France.
  - Auguste-Jules-Armand-Marie, prince de Polignac, pair de France, minister of Foreign Affairs.
  - Pyotr Mikhailovich Volkonsky, ambassadeur extraordinaire of Russia in France.

=== Third promotion (Paris, 3 June 1827) ===
- Knights :
  - Charles Paul François de Beauvilliers, duc de Saint-Aignan, pair de France and lieutenant général.
  - Jules-Gaspard-Aymard, duc de Clermont-Tonnerre, pair de France.
  - Gabriel-Jean-Joseph, comte Molitor, pair and marshal of France.
  - Pierre-Denis, Comte de Peyronnet, pair de France, minister of Justice and then of the Interior.
  - Jacques-Joseph-Guillaume-Pierre, comte de Corbière, pair de France, minister of the Interior
  - Philibert-Jean-Baptiste-Joseph, comte Curial, lieutenant général, pair de France, master of the King's wardrobe.
  - Jean, baron de La Rochefoucauld-Bayers, pair de France, lieutenant général.
  - Anne-Victor-Denis Hurault, marquis de Vibraye, pair de France, lieutenant général, honorary knight of Madame la Dauphine.
  - Armand-Charles, comte Guilleminot, pair de France, lieutenant général and ambassador in Constantinople.
  - Louis Charles Pierre Bonaventure, comte de Mesnard, pair de France, first squire of Madame la duchesse de Berri.
  - Édouard-Thomas, comte Burgues de Missiessy, vice-amiral.

=== Fourth promotion (Paris, 25 May 1828) ===
- Prelates :
  - Denis, comte Frayssinous, bishop of Hermopolis, first Almoner of the King, Minister of Ecclesiastical Affairs and Public Instruction.
- Knights :
  - Christophe, comte de Chabrol de Crouzol, pair de France, minister of the Navy.
  - Bermudès de Castro, Duke of Villahermosa, ambassador of Spain.

=== Fifth promotion (Paris, 19 February 1829) ===
- Knights :
  - Prince Antonio, Count of Lecce, son of King Francis I of the Two Sicilies.
  - Louis-Charles-Philippe-Raphaël d'Orléans, duc de Nemours.

=== Sixth and final promotion (Tuileries, 31 May 1830, Pentecost) ===
- Prelates :
  - Hyacinthe-Louis de Quélen, archbishop of Paris, pair de France, one of the 40 members of the Académie française.
  - Jean Lefebvre, cardinal de Cheverus, archbishop of Bordeaux.
- Knights :
  - Alphonse-Gabriel-Octave, prince de Broglie-Revel, maréchal de camp.
  - Étienne Narcisse, comte de Durfort, pair de France, lieutenant général.
  - Antoine Roy, pair de France, former minister of Finances.
  - Armand François Hennequin, marquis d'Ecquevilly, pair de France, inspector general of the corps of geographical engineers.
  - Honoré-Charles-Michel-Joseph, comte Reille, pair de France, lieutenant général and then marshal of France.
  - Olivier de Saint-Georges de Vérac, pair de France and lieutenant général.
  - Charles Louis Gabriel de Conflans, marquis d'Armentières (1772-1849), pair de France, maréchal de camp, first squire of Madame la Dauphine.
  - Étienne Tardif de Pommereux, comte de Bordesoulle, pair de France and lieutenant général.
  - Artus-Hugues-Gabriel-Timoléon, comte de Cossé, first master of the King's Chambers.

== See also ==
- Order of the Holy Spirit
- Order of Saint Michael

== Annexes ==
=== Bibliographie ===
- Teulet, Alexandre (1864). Liste chronologique et alphabétique des chevaliers et des officiers de l'ordre du Saint-Esprit depuis sa création en 578 jusqu'à son extinction en 1830. Paris: Librairie héraldique de J.-B. Dumoulin. p. 190.;
- Panhard, Félix (1868). L'Ordre du Saint-Esprit aux XVIII^{e} et XIX^{e} siècles: notes historiques et biographiques sur les membres de cet ordre depuis Louis XV jusqu'à Charles X. Paris: Librairie héraldique de J.-B. Dumoulin. p. 284.;
- Pinoteau, Hervé (1983). Etat de l'Ordre du Saint-Esprit en 1830: Autour des dynasties françaises; et, La survivance des ordres du roi. Vol. 2. Éditeur Nouvelles Editions Latines. p. 165. ISBN 9782723302135.;
- Popoff, Michel; Pinoteau, préface d'Hervé (1996). Armorial de l'Ordre du Saint-Esprit: d'après l'œuvre du père Anselme et ses continuateurs. Paris: Le Léopard d'or. p. 204. ISBN 2-86377-140-X.;
