= House of Potier =

Stemma Mancini Mazzarino

The House of Potier was a noble house in Ancien Régime France. Members of the Potier family were Nobles of the Robe who gained their prominence through serving the King of France.

== List of Members of the House of Potier ==
- Simon Potier, seigneur de Groslay et de Blanc-Mesnil (fl 1395/1420)
  - Nicolas I Potier, seigneur de Blancmesnil, Groslay, La Grange, Courberon et Courbevoie (d. 1501)
    - Nicolas II Potier, seigneur de Blancmesnil et de Groslay
      - Jacques Potier, seigneur de Blancmesnil et Plessis-Gassot (d. 1555)
        - Nicolas III Potier, seigneur de l’arrière-fief du Petit-Coudray à Blanc-Mesnil (c.1541-1635)
          - René Potier (c.1576-1616), Bishop of Beauvais
          - Bernard Potier, seigneur de Silly (ca. 1578–1610)
          - Nicolas IV Potier, seigneur d'Ocquerre (d. 1628)
            - René Potier, seigneur de Blancmesnil (d. 1680)
              - Marie-Renée Potier, dame de Blanc-Mesnil et du Bourget (1678-1700)
            - Augustin Potier, seigneur d'Ocquerre (d. 1704)
            - Jeanne Potier (d. 1681) - married Michel de Marillac, seigneur d'Ollainville
            - Madeleine Potier (c.1623-1705) - married Guillaume de Lamoignon, marquis de Basville
          - André Potier, seigneur de Novion (d. 1645)
            - Nicolas Potier, seigneur de Novion (c.1618-1694)
              - André Potier, marquis de Novion (d. 1677)
                - André Potier de Novion, marquis de Grignon (1659-1731)
                  - Nicolas Potier de Novion, marquis de Grignon (1685-1720)
                    - André Potier de Novion, marquis de Novion et de Grignon (1711-1769)
                      - Anne Marie Gabrielle Potier de Novion (b. 1747) - married Alexandre Guillaume de Galard de Béarn, comte de Brassac
                      - Philippa-Léontine Potier de Novion (b. 1748) - married Aimar-Charles-Marie de Nicolaï,
                  - Antoinette Potier de Novion (c.1687-1726) - married Charles-Adolphe des Lions, comte d'Epaux
                - Louis-Nicolas Anne Jules Potier de Novion, marquis de Novion (c.1666-1707)
                  - Nicolas Potier de Novion, comte de Montauglan (d. 1706 at the Battle of Ramillies)
                  - Antoinette Potier de Novion (1685-1754) - married Marshal of France Gaspard de Clermont-Tonnerre, marquis de Vauvillers
                - Marie Potier de Novion (d. 1747) - married Jean-Baptiste Louis Berryer, seigneur de La Ferrière
              - Jacques Potier de Novion (c.1647-1709), Bishop of Sisteron and then Bishop of Évreux
              - Catherine-Madeleine Potier de Novion (c.1646-1709) - married Antoine de Ribeyre, seigneur d'Homme
              - Marthe-Agnès Potier de Novion (d. 1686) - married Arnaud de Labriffe, marquis de Ferrières
          - Augustin Potier (d. 1650), Bishop of Beauvais
          - Renée Potier - married Oudart Hennequin, seigneur de Boinville
          - Madeleine Potier (c.1587-1671) - married Théodore Choart, seigneur de Buzenval
        - Louis Potier, Count of Tresmes (d. 1630)
          - René Potier, Duke of Tresmes (c.1579-1670)
            - Louis Potier, marquis de Gresves (c.1612-1643), killed at the Siege of Thionville
            - François Potier, marquis de Gesvres (c.1612-1646), killed at the Siege of Lleida
            - Léon Potier, Duke of Gesvres (c.1620-1704)
              - François-Bernard Potier, Duke of Gesvres (1655-1739)
                - François-Joachim Bernard Potier, Duke of Gesvres (1692-1757)
                - Louis-Léon Marie Potier, Duke of Gesvres (1695-1774)
                  - Louis-Joachim Paris Potier, Duke of Gesvres (1733-1794), guillotined.
                - Étienne-René Potier de Gesvres (1697-1774) - Abbot of Orcamp and cardinal
                - Marie-Françoise Potier de Gesvres (1697-1715) - married Louis-Marie Victor de Béthune
              - Léon Potier de Gesvres (1656-1744) - Abbot of St-Géraud d'Aurillac and cardinal
              - Charlotte-Julie Potier de Gesvres (1669-1752) - married Charles-Amédée de Broglie, marquis de Revel, son of François-Marie, comte de Broglie
            - Louise-Henriette Potier (d. 1680) - married (1) Emmanuel de Faudoas-Averton, comte de Belin; (2) Jacques de Saulx-Tavannes, comte de Tavannes et Buzançais
            - Marguerite Potier (d. 1669) - married Henri de Saulx-Tavannes, marquis de Mirebel
            - Renée Louise Potier (d. 1681) - Abbess of La Barre
            - Anne-Marie Madeleine Potier, marquise de Blérancourt (1623-1705), never married
        - Madeleine Potier (d. 1603) - married Bernard Prévost, seigneur de Morsan
        - Françoise Potier (d. 1618) - Abbess of Longchamp
        - Marie Potier (d. 1630) - married Claude Le Roux, seigneur de Bourgtheroulde
        - Françoise Potier - Abbess of Trois-Fontaines
        - Marthe Potier - married Nicolas Moreau, seigneur d'Auteuil et de Thoiry
      - Marie Potier (d. 1535) - married Louis de Besançon, seigneur d'Orvilliers
