= Giannelli =

Giannelli is an Italian surname. Notable people with the surname include:

- Alessandro Giannelli (born 1963), Italian former racing cyclist
- Fred Giannelli (born 1960), American electronic musician
- Mario Giannelli (1920–2003, nicknamed "Yo-Yo"), American football guard in the National Football League
- Paul Giannelli (born 1945), American lawyer, consultant and law professor
- Pietro Giannelli (1807–1881), Italian cardinal
- Ray Giannelli (born 1966), former American Major League Baseball third baseman
- Sean Giannelli (born 1996), Malaysian football player
- Simone Giannelli (born 1996), Italian volleyball player

== See also ==
- Giannelli Imbula, (born 1992), French professional footballer
