= Étienne-René Potier de Gesvres =

French Catholic cardinal (1697–1774)

His Eminence Étienne-René Potier de Gesvres
- Cardinal-Priest of Sant'Agnese fuori le mura
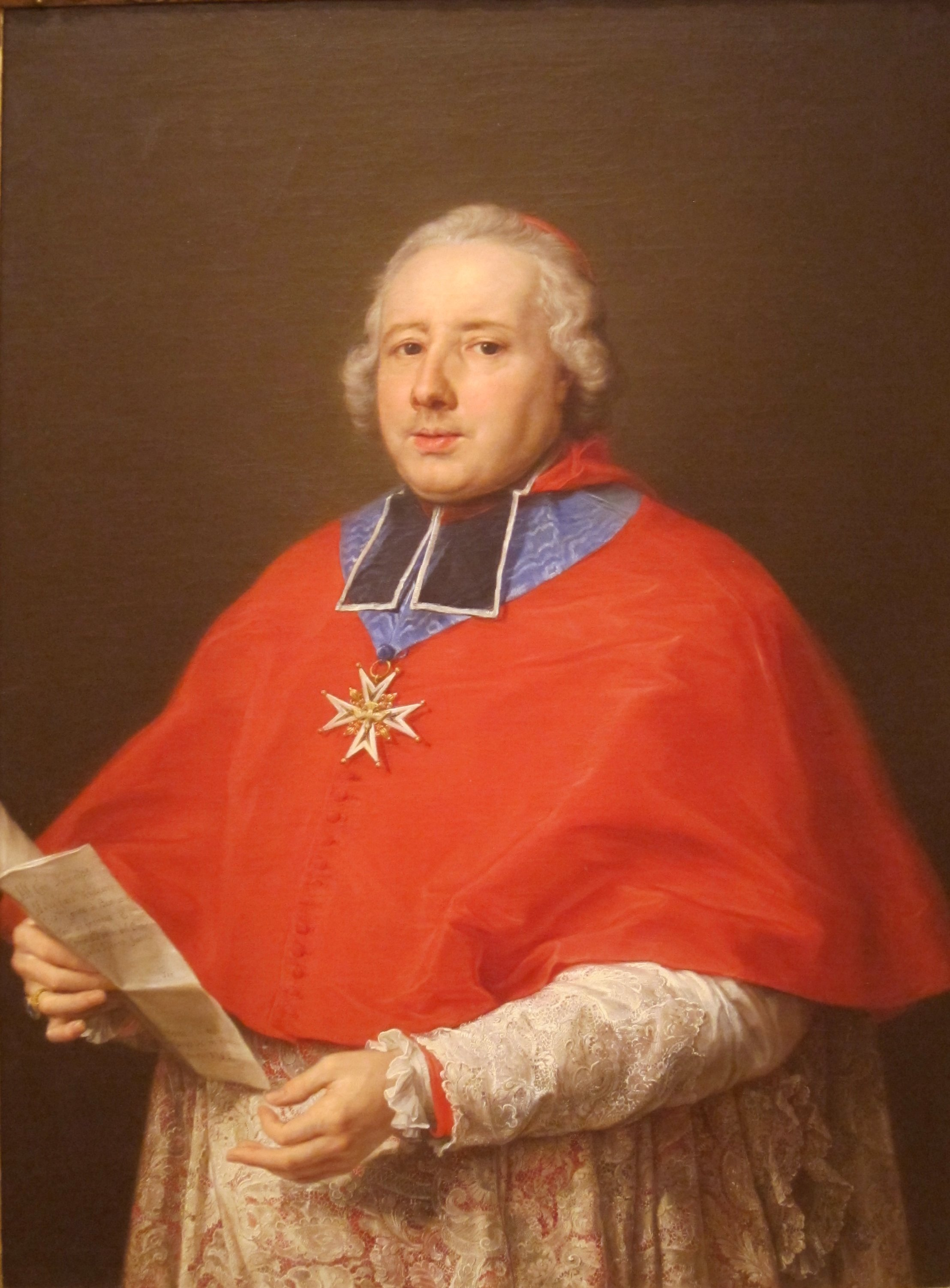
- Painting by Pompeo Batoni, 1758
- Church: Catholic Church
- Appointed: 5 April 1756 (Cardinal)
- Term ended: 24 July 1774
- Other posts: Bishop of Beauvais (1728–1772); Commander of the Order of the Holy Spirit (1758)
- Previous posts: Vicar General, Archdiocese of Bourges (1726–1728); Abbot of Notre-Dame d'Ourscamp (1723–1734); Abbot of Saint-Étienne, Caen (1759–1774)

Orders
- Ordination: 1725
- Consecration: 6 June 1728
- Created cardinal: 5 April 1756 by Pope Benedict XIV
- Rank: Cardinal-Priest

Personal details
- Born: Étienne-René Potier de Gesvres; 2 January 1697 Paris, France
- Died: 24 July 1774 (aged 77) Paris, France
- Denomination: Roman Catholic
- Education: University of Paris (Licentiate in Theology, 1718; Licentiate in Canon Law)

Étienne-René Potier de Gesvres (Paris, January 2, 1697 – Paris, July 24, 1774) was a French Cardinal of the Roman Catholic Church.

== Biography ==
He was the son of François-Bernard Potier de Gesvres, Duke of Tresmes, and his wife Marie Geneviève de Seiglières. His uncle was Cardinal Léon Potier de Gesvres; Cardinal Nicolas de Saulx-Tavannes was a distant maternal cousin.

Potier studied in Paris, where he earned a licentiate in theology in 1718 and later a licentiate in canon and constitutional law. He was ordained a priest in 1725 and subsequently served for two years as Vicar General of the Archdiocese of Bourges, where his uncle was Archbishop.

Appointed Bishop of Beauvais on April 24, 1728, he received episcopal consecration on June 6, 1728, in Saint-Ouen-l'Aumône. He was also Abbot commendatario of the royal abbey of Notre-Dame d'Ourscamp (1723–1734) and of the Abbey of Saint-Étienne, Caen (1759–1774).

Pope Benedict XIV created him a cardinal-priest on April 5, 1756, and on August 2, 1756, granted him the titular church of Sant'Agnese fuori le mura. In 1758, he was made a commander of the Order of the Holy Spirit. He participated in the conclave of 1758, but was absent in the conclave of 1769. He resigned his diocese on May 22, 1772.
