= Siege of Lens =

1647 siege during the Thirty Years' War

- Part of the Thirty Years' War
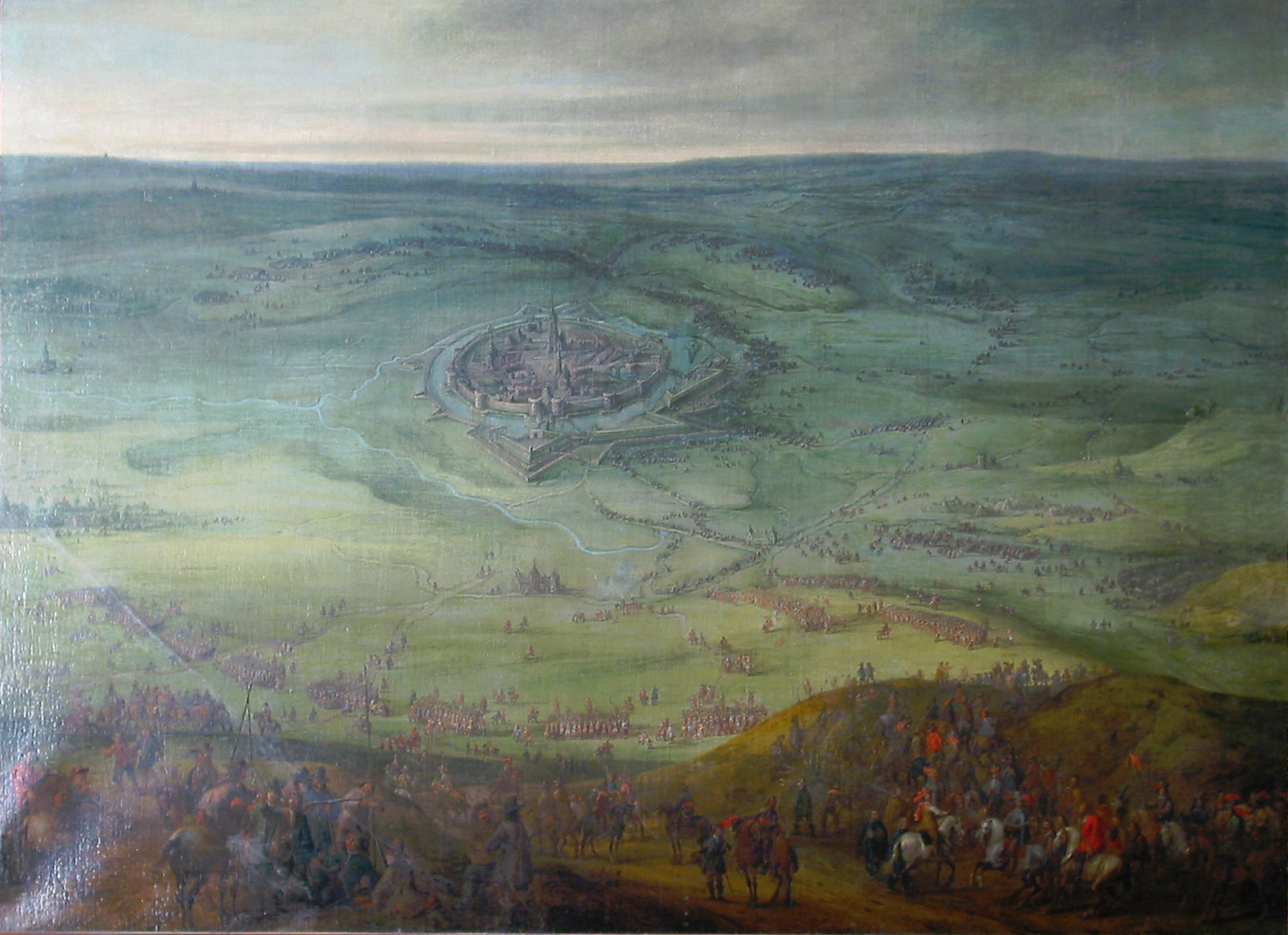
Date	c. 4 August – 3 October 1647
Location	Lens 50.422°N 2.78°E
Result	Franco-Dutch victory

Belligerents
(Kingdom of France) France; Dutch Republic	(Spain) Spanish Empire

Commanders and leaders
(Kingdom of France) Jean de Gassion (DOW) (Kingdom of France) Antoine d'Aumont	Unknown

Strength
Unknown	Unknown

Casualties and losses
Unknown	Unknown

The Siege of Lens was an episode of the Thirty Years' War. It was organised in 1647 by Jean de Gassion, Marshal of France.

== Background ==
The Siege of Lens took place during the Thirty Years' War, after France had entered the conflict directly in 1635. While its ally, the Dutch Republic, threatened to take Antwerp from the Spanish, forcing them to expose their western front, France won some successes in Flanders, along the Lys. After the Siege of Dunkirk (1646) and the Siege of Mardyck in August 1646, Marshal Jean de Gassion also captured the Château d'Isenghien on 12 September 1646. The small town of Lens was taken and retaken seven times in less than a century. In 1646, it had fallen back under Spanish control.

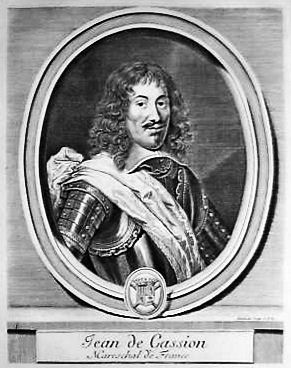
Jean de Gassion.

== Siege ==
The Siege of Lens took place the following year. The fortified place, situated in a plain, had an earth-backed wall with towers, and a wide and deep dry ditch with a covered way. On 28 September 1647, while attempting to pull out a palisade stake, Jean de Gassion was wounded in the head by a musket shot. He died at Arras on 2 October 1647.

The Siege of Lens continued under the Marquis of Villequier, who took the town on 3 October 1647. In August of the following year, the Battle of Lens took place.

== See also ==
- Battle of Lens
- Franco-Spanish War (1635–1659)
- Lens, Pas-de-Calais
