= Beaufort Castle, Luxembourg =

Historic structure in Beaufort, Luxembourg

Coordinates: 49°50′02″N 6°17′08″E

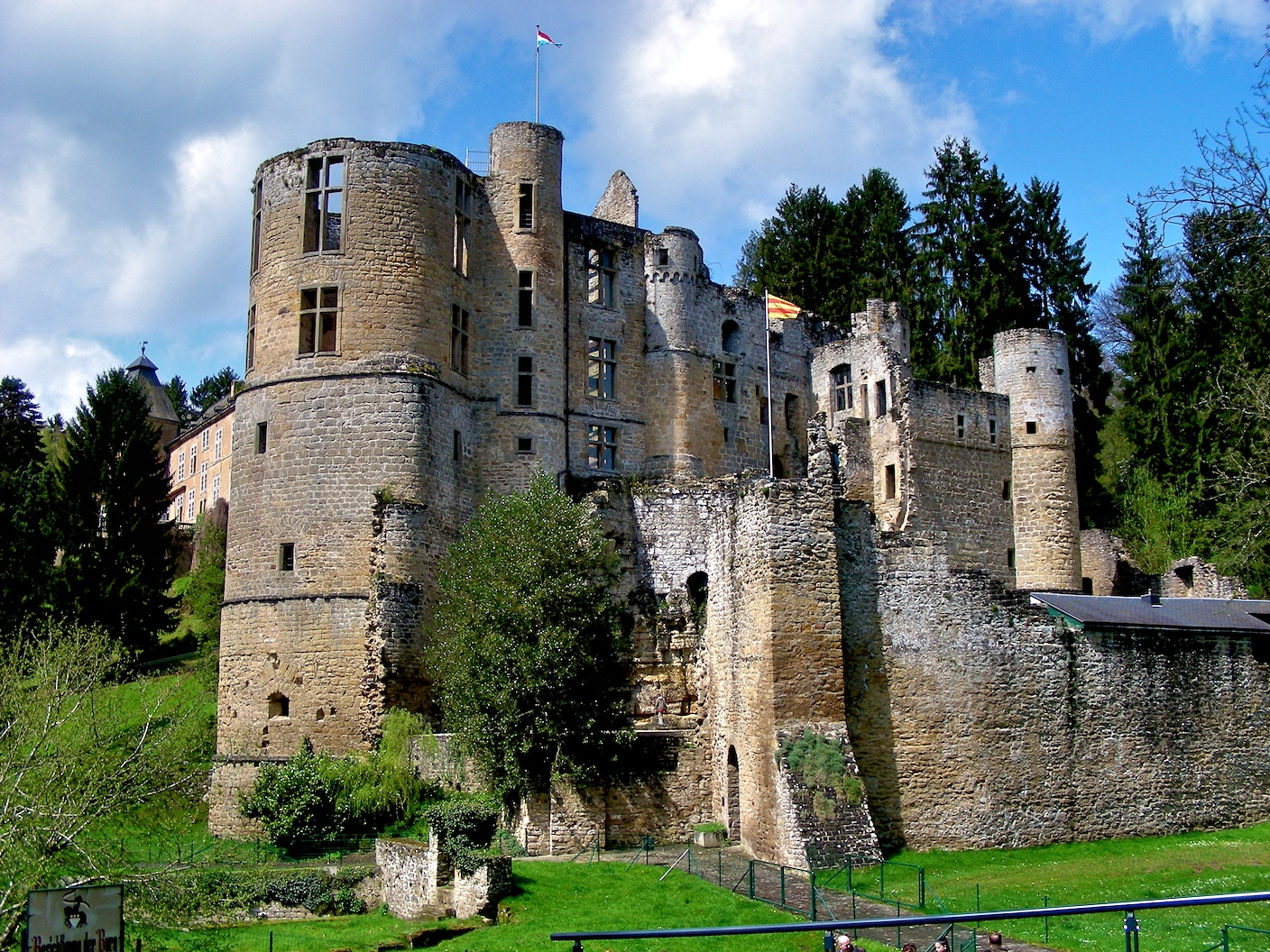
Beaufort Castle in 2008

Beaufort Castle (Luxembourgish: Buerg Beefort; French: Château de Beaufort; German: Burg) dating from the 11th century consists of the ruins of the medieval fortress and an adjacent residence from the 17th century. It is located in Beaufort in eastern Luxembourg.

== History ==
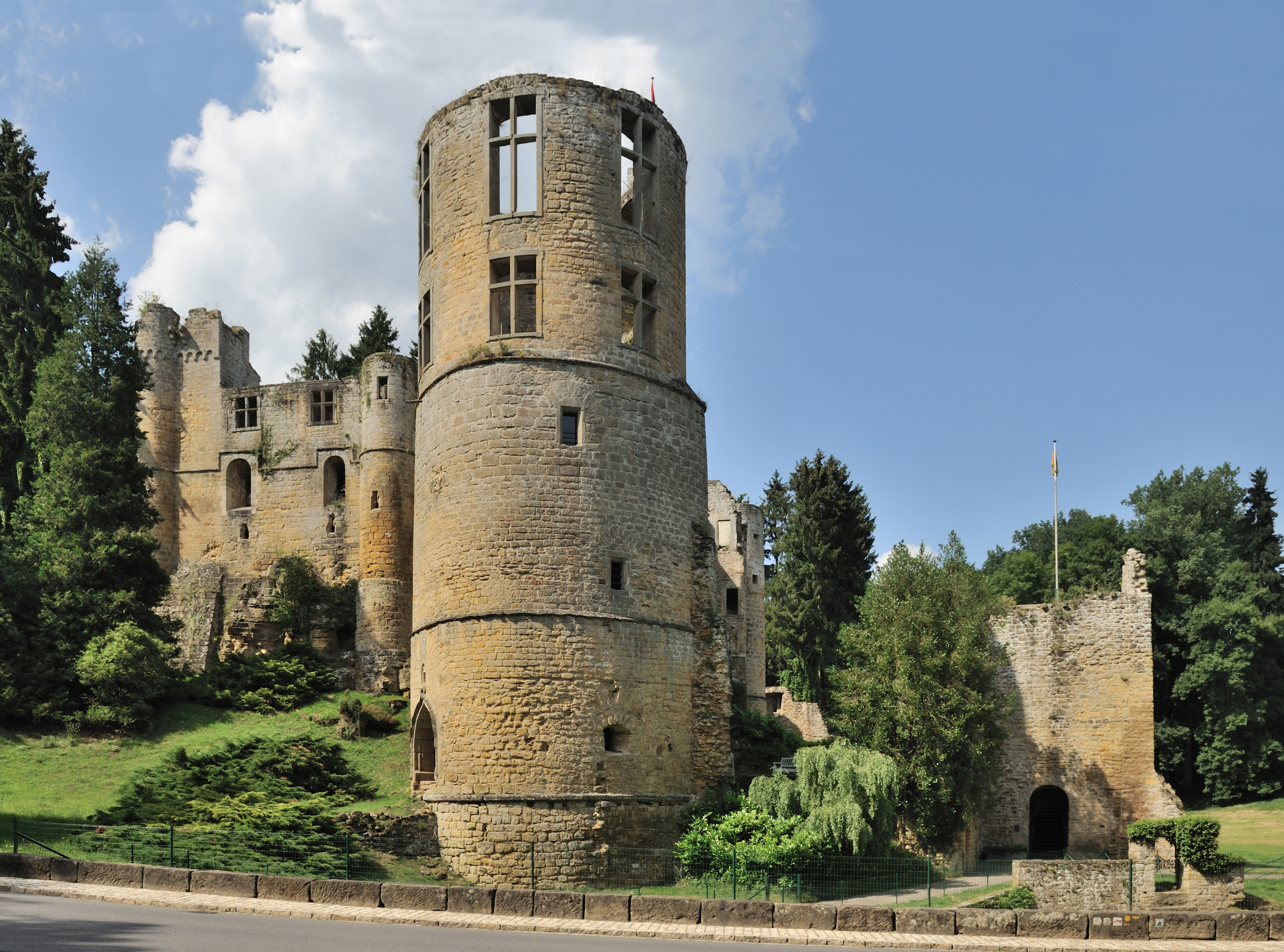
Beaufort Castle

It was probably in the 11th century that the castle began as a small square-shaped fortress on a large rock protected by a moat and a second wall above the valley. A reference from 1192 indicates that Wauthier de Wiltz et Beaufort was its first lord. During the first half of the 12th century, a keep was added and the gate was moved and enlarged. In 1348, the property came into the hands of the House of Orley after Adelaide of Beaufort married William of Orley. The Lords of Orley made significant extensions overlooking the valley. In 1477, Maximilian of Austria transferred the castle to Johann Bayer von Boppard after Johann von Orley-Beaufort committed a breach in trust. In 1539, Bernard von Velbrück became Lord of Beaufort through marriage and added the large wing with cross-framed windows on top of the medieval walls.

The castle then came into the hands of Gaspard de Heu who had married Velbrück's granddaughter. A partisan of the Dutch resistance and the House of Orange, de Heu was captured by the Spaniards, accused of heresy and treason, and publicly executed in Luxembourg's fish market in 1593. Philip II of Spain confiscated the property and entrusted it to Peter Ernst Graf von Mansfeld, the governor of Luxembourg. Through marriage, the castle became the property of Henri de Chalon and then Gaspard du Bost-Moulin who had to sell it after being ruined by the Thirty Years War. Acting on behalf of the Spanish king, Johann Baron von Beck, governor of Luxembourg, bought most of the property in 1639. He initiated the construction of a new residence in 1643 but after he died of injuries from the Battle of Lens in 1648, the work was completed by his son in 1649.

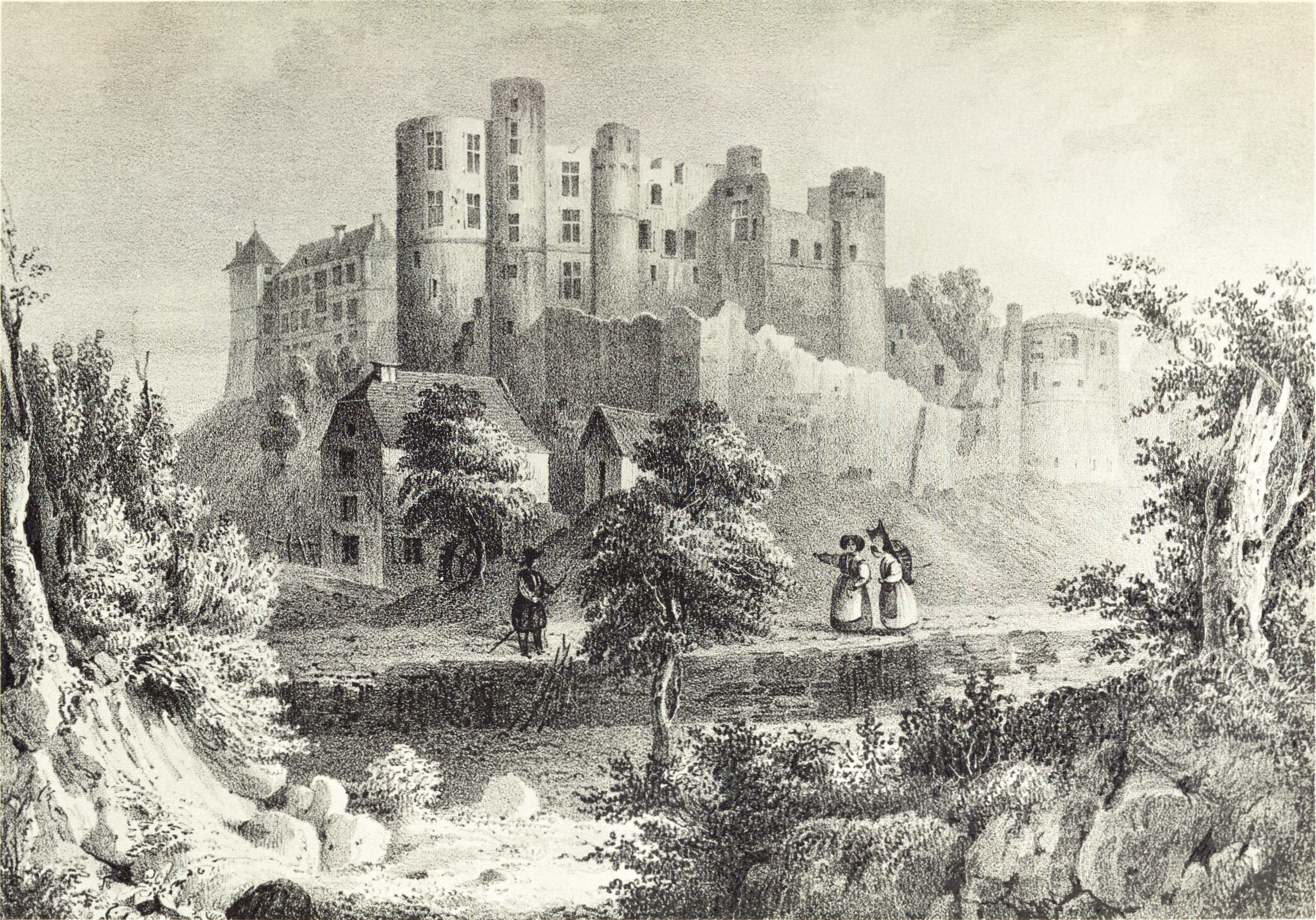
Nicolas Liez: drawing (1834)

After various changes in ownership including Pierre de Coumont (1774) and Jean Théodore Baron de Tornaco-Vervoy (1781), the castle was abandoned, fell into disrepair and at the beginning of the 19th century was even used as a quarry. In 1850, it was listed by the State as a national monument. In 1893, the new owner Henri Even restored the new building and, in 1928, Edmond Linkels cleared the rubble away and opened the medieval castle to visitors. In 1981, the property was acquired by the State.

== The castle today ==
The Beaufort estate can be visited.

== Gallery ==
Flag which flies over Beaufort Castle.

== See also ==
- List of castles in Luxembourg
