= Relief of Thionville =

1639 battle of the Thirty Years' War

Coordinates: 49.3589°N 6.1692°E

Battle of Thionville
- Part of the Thirty Years' War and the Franco-Spanish War (1635–59)
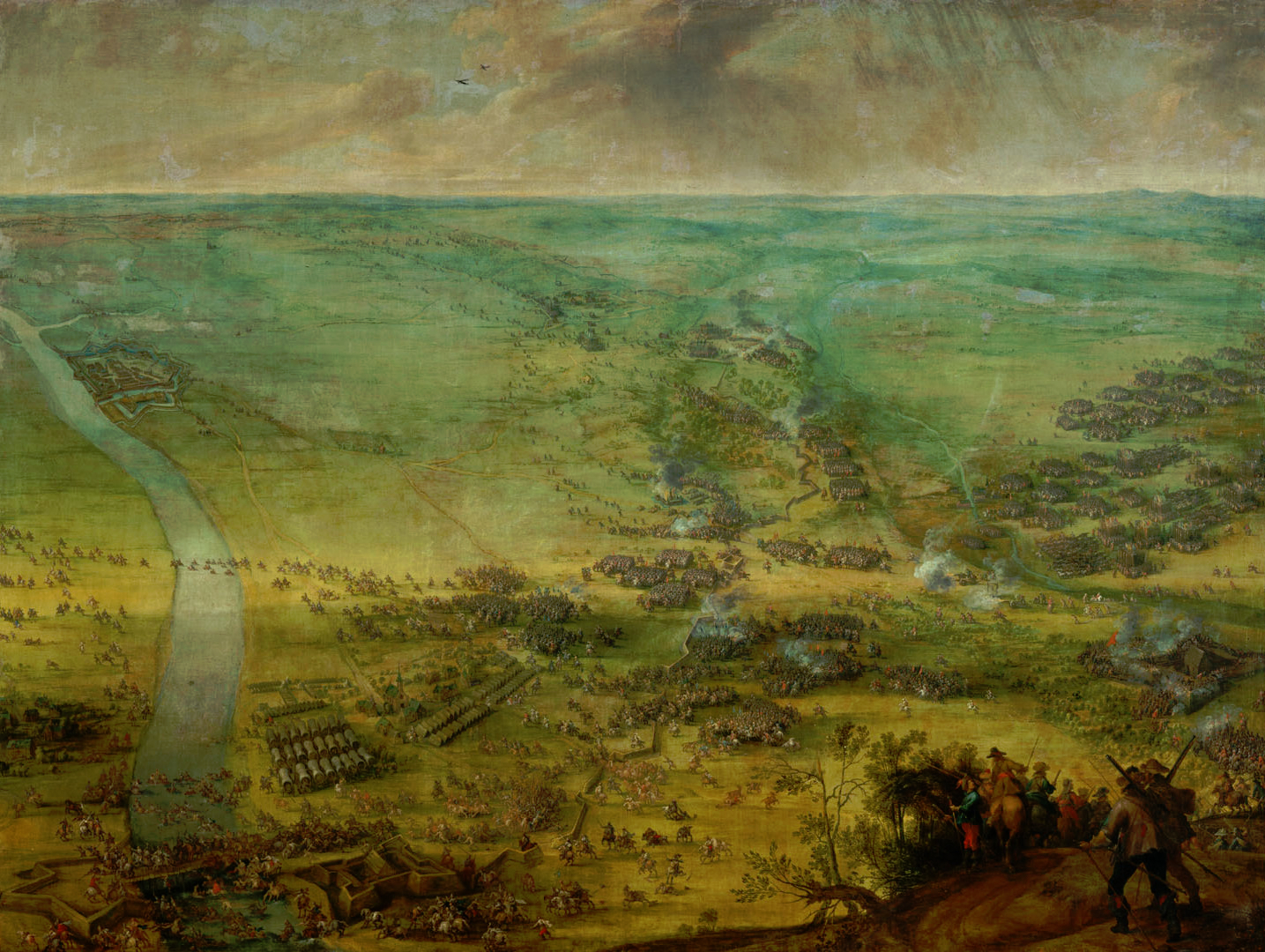
- The Battle at Diedenhofen (Thionville) 1639, by Peter Snayers
Date	7 June 1639
Location	Thionville, near Luxembourg, Spanish Netherlands (present-day France)
Result	Imperial-Spanish victory

Belligerents
France	Spain; Holy Roman Empire

Commanders and leaders
(Kingdom of France) Marquis de Feuquieres (POW) (DOW)	(Holy Roman Empire) Ottavio Piccolomini (Holy Roman Empire) Camillo Gonzaga (Spain) Jean de Beck (Spanish Empire) Ernst de Suys

Strength
9,000 infantry 2,600 cavalry Total at Feuquieres' disposal: 15,000 infantry 5,000 cavalry	9,000 infantry 5,000 cavalry

Casualties and losses
6,000 dead or wounded 3,000 captured 22 cannon captured	1,500 dead or wounded

The relief of Thionville (or the Battle of Thionville/Diedenhofen) took place on 7 June 1639, during the Thirty Years' War. The allied Imperial-Spanish forces under the overall command of Ottavio Piccolomini hammered the French force under the leadership of Marquis de Feuquieres, causing it to lift the siege of the Thionville stronghold.

== Prelude ==
Coordinated French and Dutch attacks on the Spanish Netherlands in May 1638 forced Spain to abandon a planned offensive in Artois. Despite fighting on two fronts simultaneously, the Spanish Army of Flanders managed to defeat the Dutch at Kallo in June while Thomas Francis, Prince of Carignano and the Imperial auxiliary corps under Ottavio Piccolomini lifted the French Siege of Saint-Omer in July. France renewed his attacks in 1639 by besieging Hesdin with 14,000 men under La Meilleraye supported by additional troops under Châtillon. The Marquis de Feuquieres was ordered to capture the principal fortress of Thionville in the Duchy of Luxemburg. Control of Thionville secured access to the southern Spanish Netherlands and the Moselle Valley, it also enabled the Imperials to support their Spanish allies by threatening the French flank.

== Battle ==
Feuquieres had laid siege to Thionville with 12,000 French troops. An Imperial-Spanish relief force commanded by Piccolomini with 5,000 cavalry and 9,000 infantrymen arrived in early morning of 7 June to lift the siege. This force included a Spanish contingent led by the Luxembourgish baron Jean de Beck, with the tercio of Naples and the artillery directed by Ernest de Suys.

In the morning, the Imperials attacked the opposing positions, then the battle stopped for a while which allowed the French to line up (11:00), while Piccolomini sent reinforcements inside the fortress. The Imperials returned to the attack (16:00) and conquered the hill on the left side to the French, where Piccolomini placed the artillery. Under Imperial artillery fire, the French cavalry was charged by the Imperial cavalry under the Marquis Camillo Gonzaga. The French cavalry was defeated and persecuted. The garrison sallied out against the French right flank.

The Imperials enveloped and defeated the French infantry, capturing all the artillery and numerous materials. The French army lost 6,000 dead and wounded as well as 3,000 prisoners including Feuquieres, who died from his injuries, and Count Pas, commander of the infantry. The victorious Imperial-Spanish army only lost 1,500 men.

== Aftermath ==
Feuquières, wounded in the fighting, was captured by the Imperial forces and died in captivity. In recognition of his victory, Piccolomini was created Duke of Amalfi by the Spanish Crown on 28 June.

In 1643 the Duc d'Enghien capitalised on his victory at Rocroi by pushing on to Thionville, which fell after a stubborn defence by the Spanish garrison.
