= Nicolas de Saulx-Tavannes =

French clergyman (1690–1795)

His Eminence Nicolas de Saulx-Tavannes
- Cardinal, Archbishop of Rouen; Primate of Normandy
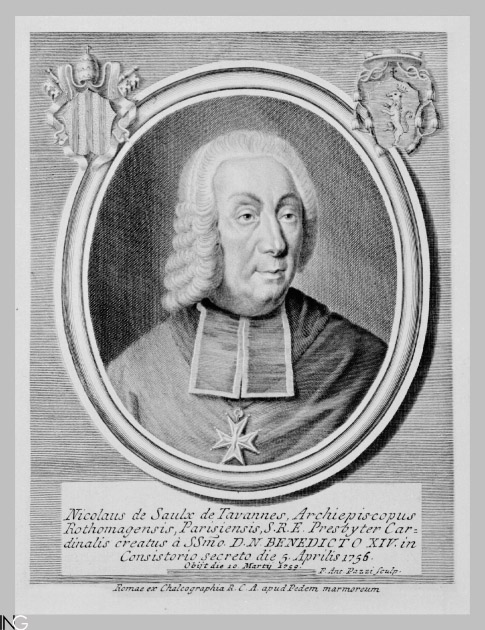
- Nicolas de Saulx-Tavannes by Pietro Antonio Pazzi
- Church: Roman Catholic Church
- In office: 1733–1759
- Predecessor: Louis de La Vergne-Montenard de Tressan
- Successor: Dominique de La Rochefoucauld
- Other post: Grand Almoner of France (1748–1759)
- Previous post: Bishop of Chalons (1721–1733)

Orders
- Consecration: 9 November 1721 by André-Hercule de Fleury
- Created cardinal: 5 April 1756 by Pope Benedict XIV
- Rank: Cardinal-Priest

Personal details
- Born: September 1690 Paris, France
- Died: 10 March 1759 (aged 68) Paris, France

Nicolas-Charles de Saulx-Tavannes (19 September 1690 – 10 March 1759) was a French clergyman. A peer of France, he was also Archbishop of Rouen, Cardinal and Grand Almoner of France.

== Biography ==
Nicolas de Saulx-Tavannes was born on 19 September 1690 in Paris to Charles-Marie de Saulx de Tavannes, Count of Buzançais, Marquis of Tavannes, and Marie-Catherine d'Aguesseau, Lady of Lux.

He was the nephew of the Chancellor d'Aguesseau and the cousin of the Cardinal de Gesvres.

Appointed Bishop-Count of Châlons-en-Champagne by the Duke of Orléans, regent of the France, he was consecrated on 9 November 1721 at the Theatines church in Paris by André-Hercule de Fleury, former bishop of Fréjus, assisted by François-César Le Blanc, bishop of Avranches and François Honoré de Casaubon de Maniban, bishop of Mirepoix. He therefore became a Peer of France.

He attended the coronation of King Louis XV on 25 October 1722. That same year he blessed the marriage between Duke Louis of Orléans and Princess Auguste of Baden-Baden.

Commendatory abbot of Saint-Michel-en-Thiérache Abbey in 1725, he became first chaplain of Queen Maria Leszczyńska in 1725 and her grand chaplain in 1743.

He resigned the Bishopric of Châlons on 17 December 1733 and was promoted the next day to Archbishop of Rouen.

In 1745, he was named commendatory abbot of Saint-Étienne de Caen. In 1748, Louis XV named him Commander of the Order of the Holy Spirit and Grand Almoner of France. He also became principal of the Sorbonne.

On 4 February 1755, he celebrated in the Hôtel de Machault the marriage of Jean de Noailles, 5th Duke of Noailles, and Henriette Anne Louise d'Aguesseau, his cousin.

He was created Cardinal-priest during the consistory of 5 April 1756 held by Pope Benedict XIV. The Pope sent him the red bar with an apostolic brief dated 7 April 1756, but Nicolas de Saulx never went to Rome to receive the red hat and did not have the title of cardinal. He also did not participate in the conclave of 1758 which elected Pope Clement XIII.

He died on 10 March 1759 in Paris and is buried in the Saint-Sulpice church without having a funeral memorial.

== Links ==
- Catholic Hierarchy
