= Jean de Beck =

Luxembourgish military man (1588–1648)

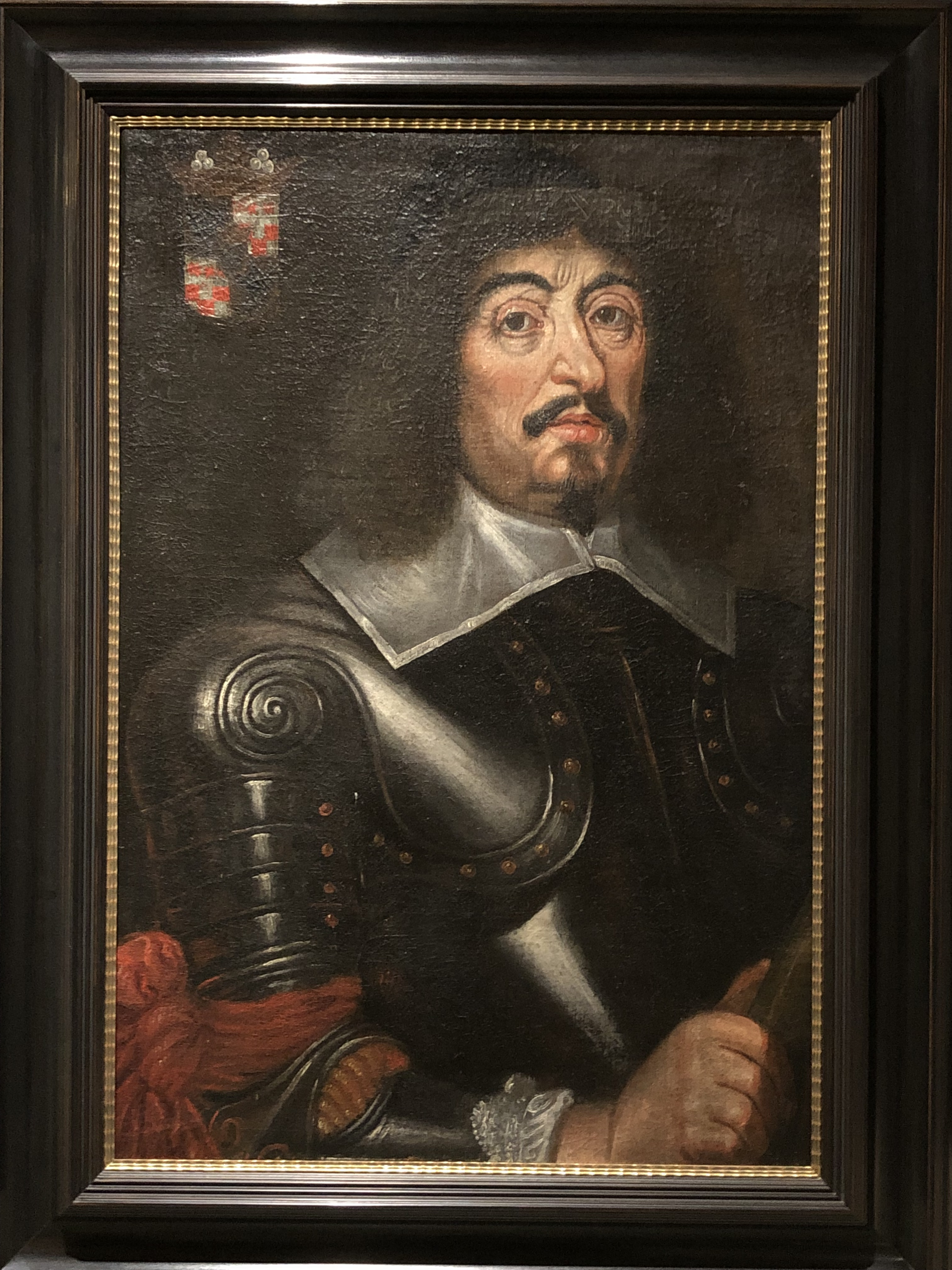
Jean de Beck

Baron Jean de Beck (1588 – 30 August 1648) was a military man and governor of the Duchy of Luxembourg and of the County of Chiny.

== Biography ==
He was born "Jean Beck", the son of Paul Beck and his wife Catherine Ronck (or Ronckart), in house no. 5 (demolished in 1958) of the rue de Trèves in the Grund of Luxembourg City.

In 1619, he joined the Austrian-Habsburg army.

He fought for many years under Philip III and Philip IV as a soldier, ensign and finally as captain. Under the Spanish flag he served at Ostende, then after an interruption of ten years, from 1620 served in the Palatinate under Spinola. From 1621 he fought under Cordoba, in the regiment of his uncle, Sebastian Baur. It is unclear when he left the Spanish service.

In 1632 or 1633, he was promoted to major-general by Albrecht von Wallenstein and, in 1634, was appointed commander of the Prague garrison.

On 25 February 1634, he was ennobled by Emperor Ferdinand II for his service in the Imperial army. In the summer of 1635, after leaving Wallenstein, he returned to Luxembourg.

On 18 April 1637, Ferdinand III made him a baron. In the same year, he became commander of the Luxembourg fortress. The year after, he was made provisional governor of the Duchy of Luxembourg and the county of Chiny. This became official on 18 January 1642. In 1643, he became maître de camp général of the army.

In 1639, Beck commanded the Spanish and Imperial vanguard at the relief of Thionville. In the same year, he bought Beaufort Castle and built a new castle next to it.

The year 1643 was a year of misfortune for him. On 19 May, warned too late, he arrived on the battlefield of Rocroi just as Condé's victory over Melo's Spaniards was secured and, with his cavalry, could only protect the retreat of the defeated army. Later, he did not have enough forces to relieve the Siege of Thionville, which Condé had besieged on 17 June and capitulated op 5 August.

In the Battle of Lens, he was wounded on 20 August 1648 and transported to Arras, where he refused all medical care. A few days later he died of his wounds.

De Beck never forgot his humble origins. Despite acquiring a substantial fortune, he remained generous.
The Bastion Beck of the Luxembourg fortress is named after him. It was built in 1644, where the Place de la Constitution is today. Likewise, rue Beck in the city is named after him.

Beck resided in a house in Luxembourg in the Rue Genistre.

Beck had only one spouse. From 1610 he was married to Katharina von Capell, who survived him by some years and likely died in the late 1650s.
