= Nicolas Potier de Novion =

French magistrate

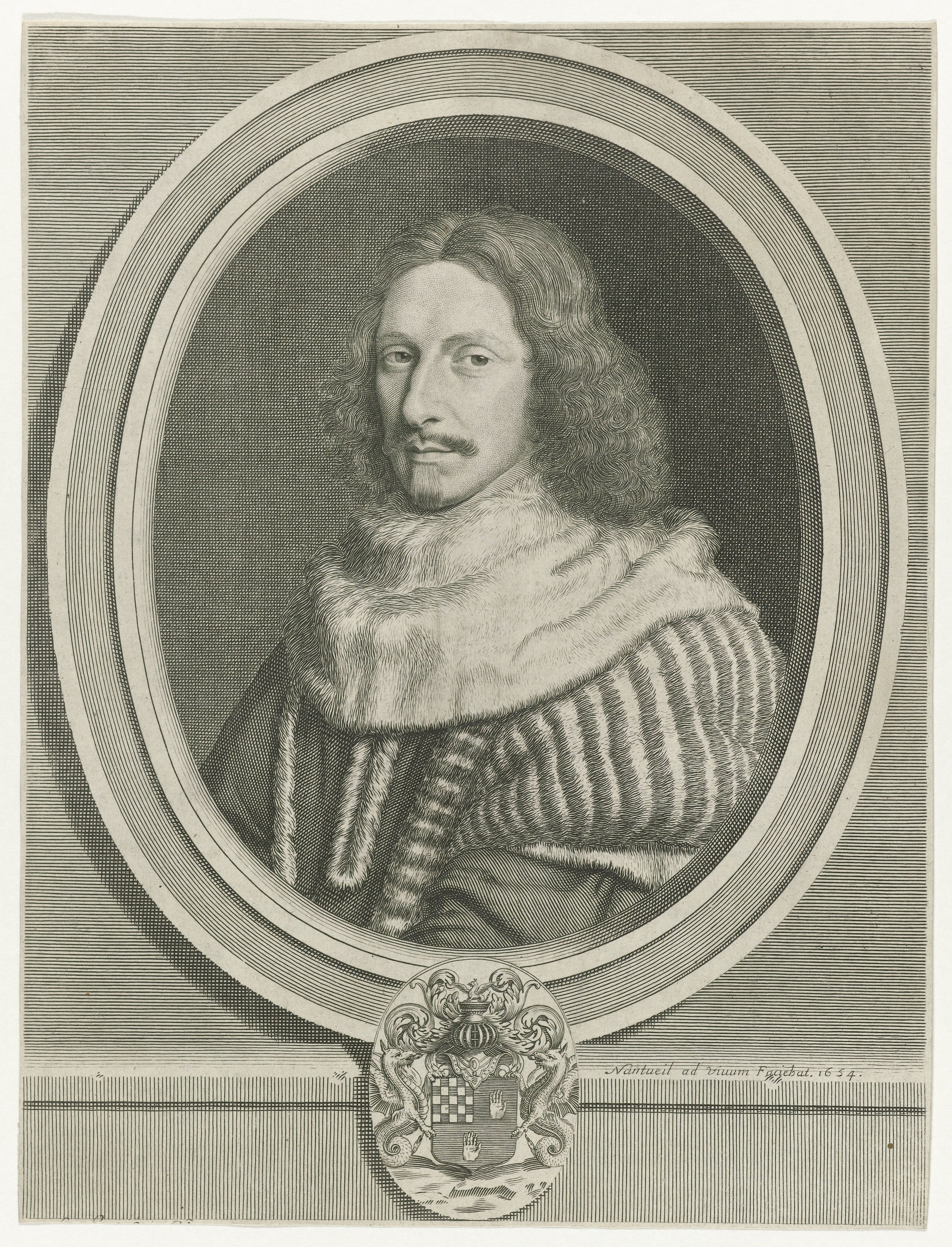

Nicolas Potier de Novion (1618 – 1 September 1693) was a French Noble of the Robe of the Ancien Régime and a member of the House of Potier.

== Biography ==
Potier de Novion was born into the Potier de Blancmesnil family, to André I Potier de Novion, president of parliament, and Catherine Cavelier.

In 1637, he became a Royal counsellor and in 1645, the président à mortier of the Parlement of Paris.

He opposed Cardinal Mazarin, who was born in Italy, and proposed to Parliament to impose a decree prohibiting, under penalty of death, any foreigner from holding ministerial office. First President of the Parliament of Paris in 1678, he was later forced to resign. "It was discovered," said Saint-Simon, "that Novion was forging decrees at the signing, long before anyone dared complain."

He had no literary merit and produced no works. Elected to the Academy on March 17, 1681, to replace Olivier Patru, he was formally inducted on March 27, and his very short acceptance speech was utterly ridiculous. Novion is one of the Academy's most egregious errors.
He was Director at the time of the Furetière affair; he summoned him to his home along with the commissioners appointed by the Academy, but Furetière did not appear.

=== Marriage and children ===
He married Catherine Gallard (c.1623-1685), daughter of Claude Gallard, baron du Puget, and had:

- André Potier, marquis de Novion (d. 1677) - married Catherine Anne Malon de Bercy, had issue
- Claude Potier (1638-1722), comte de Novion - married twice, had issue
- Jacques Potier de Novion (c.1647-1709), Bishop of Sisteron and then Bishop of Évreux
- Catherine-Madeleine Potier de Novion (c.1646-1709) - married Antoine de Ribeyre, seigneur d'Homme
- Marguerite Potier (d. 1705) - married Charles Tubeuf, baron de Blanzac
- Marthe-Agnès Potier de Novion (d. 1686) - married Arnaud de Labriffe, marquis de Ferrières..
