= André-Hercule de Fleury =

French cardinal and statesman (1653–1743)

His Eminence André-Hercule de Fleury
- Cardinal, Bishop Emeritus of Fréjus
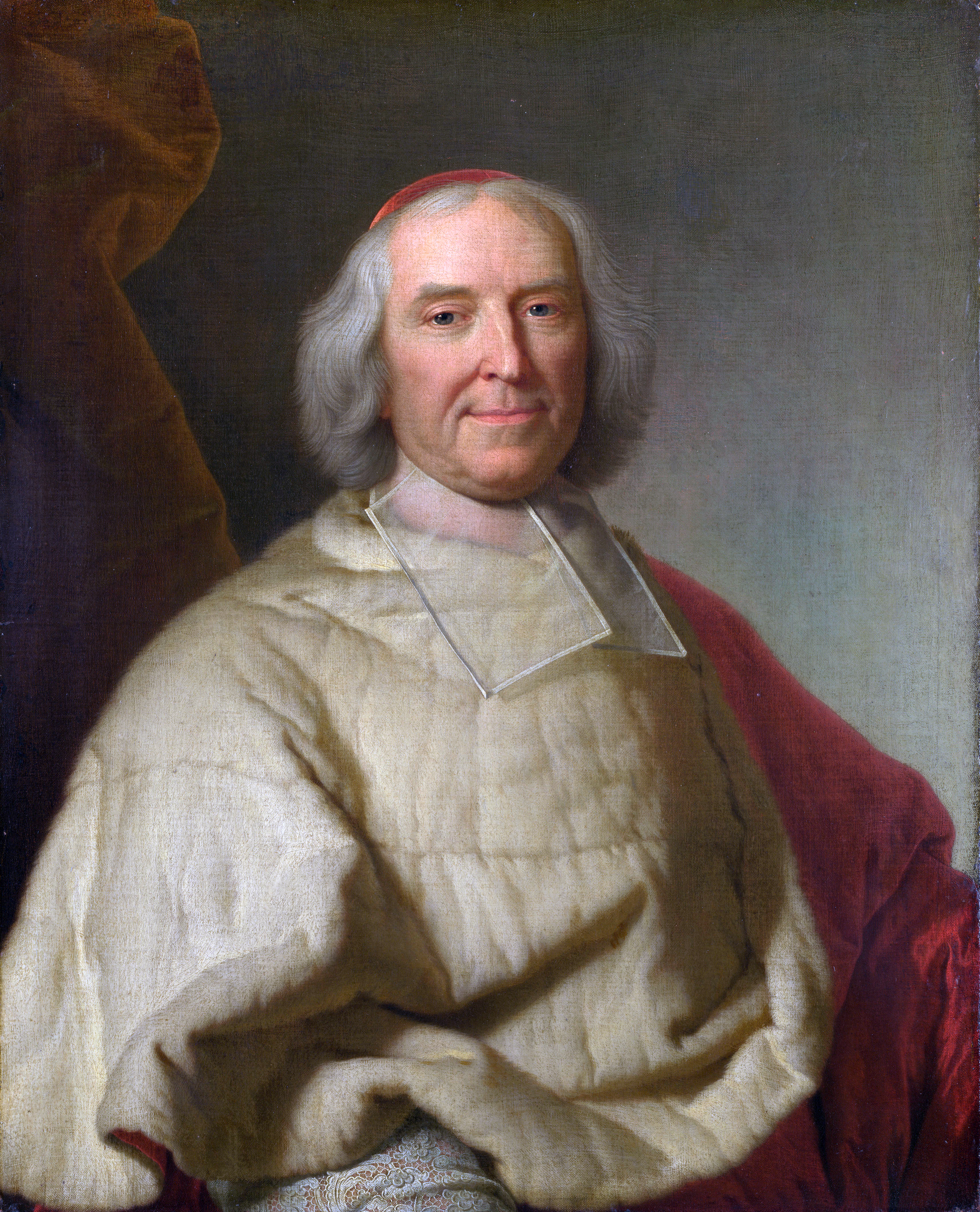
- Cardinal de Fleury, official portrait by Hyacinthe Rigaud, Château de Versailles
- Archdiocese: Aix
- Diocese: Fréjus
- Installed: 18 May 1698
- Term ended: 3 May 1715
- Predecessor: Louis d'Aquin
- Successor: Pierre de Castellane
- Other posts: Cardinal-priest; no title assigned

Orders
- Ordination: 1679
- Consecration: 22 November 1698 by Louis Antoine de Noailles
- Created cardinal: 11 September 1726 by Pope Benedict XIII
- Rank: Cardinal-priest

Personal details
- Born: 22 June 1653 Lodève, Languedoc-Roussillon, France
- Died: 29 January 1743 (aged 89) Issy-les-Moulineaux, Île-de-France, France
- Denomination: Roman Catholic
- Signature: André-Hercule de Fleury's signature

First Minister of State
- In office 11 June 1726 – 29 January 1743
- Monarch: Louis XV
- Preceded by: Louis Henri, Duke of Bourbon
- Succeeded by: Étienne François de Choiseul (1758)

André-Hercule de Fleury (French: [ɑ̃dʁe ɛʁkyl də flœʁi]; 22 June or 26 June 1653 – 29 January 1743) was a French Catholic prelate who served as Bishop of Fréjus and as the chief minister of Louis XV. He was created a cardinal in 1726 by Pope Benedict XIII.

== Life and government ==
He was born in Lodève, Hérault, the son of a tax farmer of a noble family. He was sent to Paris as a child to be educated by the Jesuits in philosophy and the Classics as much as in theology. He entered the priesthood nevertheless and through the influence of Cardinal Bonzi became almoner to Maria Theresa, queen of Louis XIV, and, after her death, to the king himself. In 1698 he was appointed bishop of Fréjus, but seventeen years in a provincial see eventually determined him to seek a position at court.

In May 1715, a few months before the Sun-King's death, Fleury became tutor to Louis' great-grandson and heir, and in spite of a seeming lack of ambition, he acquired an influence over the child that was never broken, fostered by Louis' love and confidence. On the death of the regent Philippe d'Orléans in 1723, Louis XV came of age. Fleury, although already seventy years of age, deferred his own supremacy by suggesting the appointment of Louis Henri, duke of Bourbon, as first minister. Fleury was present at all interviews between Louis XV and his titular first minister, and on Bourbon's attempt to break through this rule Fleury retired from court. Louis made Bourbon recall the tutor, who on 11 June 1726 took affairs into his own hands and secured the exile from court of Bourbon and of his mistress Madame de Prie. He continued to refuse the formal title of first minister, but his elevation to cardinal, in 1726, confirmed his precedence over any others.

Under the Régence, the Scottish economist John Law had introduced financial measures that were modern for the time: a national bank, easy credit to encourage investors, and paper money exchangeable for gold bullion. Investor overconfidence in the ability to exchange paper money for gold led to wild speculation after 1720, and when the bubble burst, Law and his policies were thoroughly discredited, and French finances were in as dire straits as they had been when Louis XIV died. Fleury was imperturbable in his demeanor, frugal and prudent, and he carried these qualities into the administration. In 1726 he fixed the standard of the currency and secured French credit by initiating regular payment of interest on the national debt, with the result that in 1738/39 there was a surplus of 15,000,000 livres instead of the usual deficit. Fleury's stringencies were enforced through the contrôleur général des finances Philibert Orry (who remained in office until 1745). By exacting forced labor from the peasants (see corvée) he improved France's roads, though at the cost of rousing angry discontent, which later found expression in the French Revolution. During the seventeen years of his orderly government, the country found time to recuperate its forces after the exhaustion caused by the ambitions of Louis XIV and extravagances of the regent, and national prosperity increased. Social peace was seriously disturbed by the severities which Fleury exercised against the Jansenists. He was one of the minority of French bishops who published Clement XI's bull Unigenitus and imprisoned priests who refused to accept it, and he met the Jansenist opposition of the Parlement of Paris by exiling forty of its members to a "gilded cage" not far from Paris.

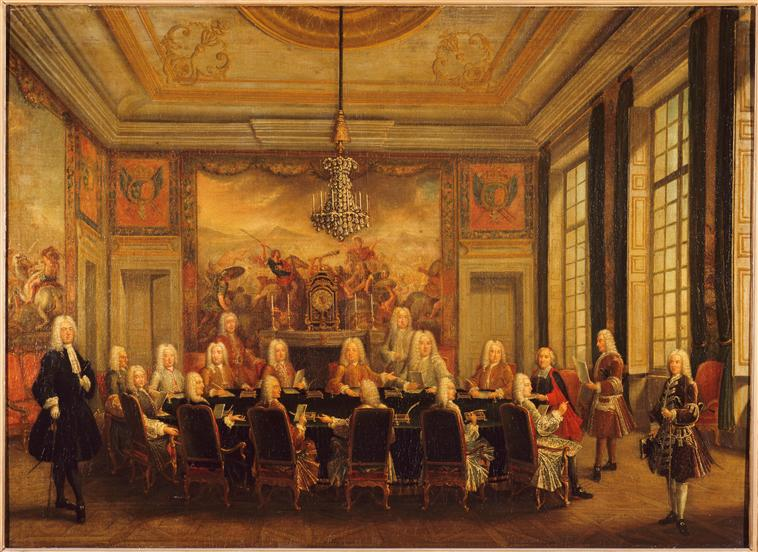
The duc d'Orléans' Council with Cardinal Fleury

In foreign affairs, the maintenance of peace was a preoccupation he shared with Sir Robert Walpole, and the two old enemies refrained from war during Fleury's ministry. Some Jacobite sympathizers in France had formed lodges of Freemasons; their attempts to influence Fleury to support the Stuart faction led instead to raids on their premises, and Fleury urged Pope Clement XII to issue a bull in 1738 that forbade all Roman Catholics to become Freemasons under threat of excommunication. It was only with reluctance that he supported the ambitious projects of Elizabeth Farnese, queen of Spain, in Italy by guaranteeing in 1729 the succession of Don Carlos to the duchies of Parma and Tuscany. French diplomacy however was losing its military bite. Fleury's cagey double game with the Corsican revolutionaries under Giacinto Paoli, smuggled arms to the island while assuring the Genoese of French support. Fleury thus began the manipulations that landed Corsica in the arms of France in 1768.

Fleury's economies in the army and navy, as elsewhere, found the nation poorly prepared when in 1733 the War of the Polish Succession was forced upon France. He was compelled by court opinion to support the claims of Louis XV's father-in-law Stanislaus Leszczynski to the Polish crown on the death of Augustus II, against the Russian and Austrian candidate; but the despatch of a French expedition to Gdańsk turned into a humiliation. Fleury was pressed by his advisor Germain Louis Chauvelin to more energetic measures; he concluded a close alliance with the Spanish Bourbons and sent armies against the Austrians twice. Military successes on the Rhine and in Italy secured the favorable terms of the treaty of Vienna (1735–1738). France had joined with the other powers in guaranteeing the succession of Maria Theresa under the Pragmatic Sanction. But by a diplomatic quibble, Fleury found an excuse on the death of Charles VI in 1740 for repudiating his engagements, when he found the party of war supreme in the king's counsels. After the disasters of the Bohemian campaign at the outbreak of the War of the Austrian Succession he wrote in confidence a humble letter to the Habsburg general, Königsegg, who immediately published it. Fleury disavowed his own letter, and died in Issy-les-Moulineaux, a few days after the French evacuation of Prague on 20 January 1743.

He had enriched the royal library by many valuable oriental manuscripts, and was a member of the Académie Française from 1717, of the Academy of Sciences, and the Academy of Inscriptions.

In the years following Fleury's death, escalating Franco-British skirmishes at sea culminated in a declaration of war with Britain in March 1744, a war he had avoided for so long, a war effectively ending the relatively peaceful period from 1713–1744, a period sometimes referred to the "Thirty Years' Peace" of which Cardinal Dubois and Philippe D'Orléans were the primary architects.

Records
Preceded by Giuseppe Renato Imperiali	Oldest living Member of the Sacred College; 18 February 1737 - 20 January 1743	Succeeded by Léon Potier de Gesvres
