= Siege of Thionville (1643) =

- Part of the Franco-Spanish War
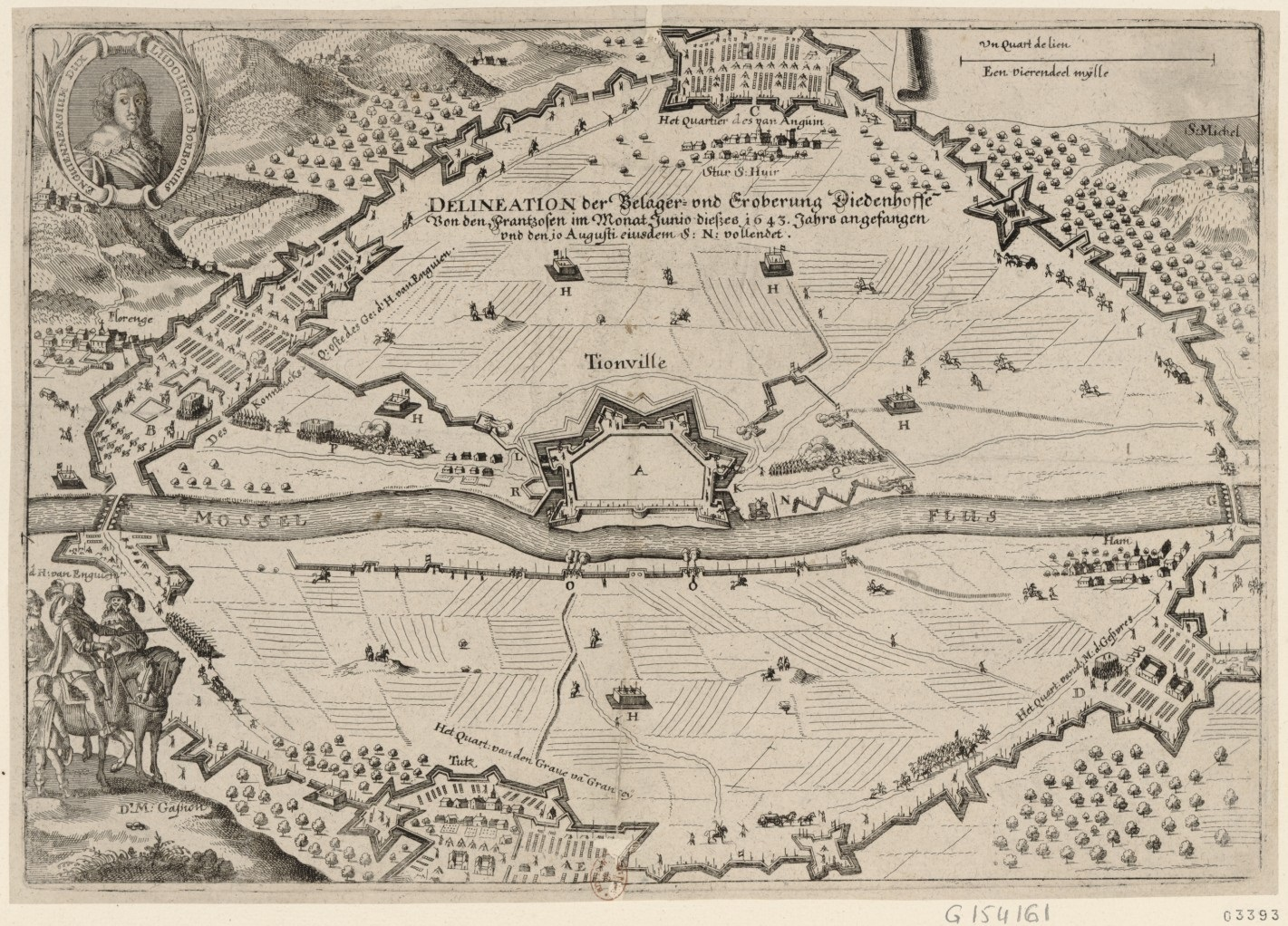
Date	16 June – 8 August 1643
Location	Thionville
Result	French victory

Belligerents
France	Spain

Commanders and leaders
(Kingdom of France) Louis, Grand Condé	(Spain) Jean de Beck

Strength
50,000	2,800

Casualties and losses
Unknown	1,600

The Siege of Thionville, which took place from June 16 to August 8, 1643, during the Franco-Spanish War (1635–1659), pitted the French army of Louis II de Bourbon-Condé, the future Grand Condé, in the service of King Louis XIV of France, against the garrison of Thionville in the service of King Philip IV of Spain. It ended in victory for the French troops.

This episode occurred a few weeks after the historic victory won by Louis II de Bourbon-Condé at the Battle of Rocroi on May 19, five days after the death of King Louis XIII.

== Context ==
Thionville was in 1643 a town and stronghold of the Duchy of Luxembourg, a fief of the Holy Roman Empire, but under the control of the Habsburg kings of Spain (descendants of Emperor Charles V), and thus part of what was known as the Spanish Netherlands.

Following the victory at Rocroi, Louis II de Bourbon-Condé (the future "Grand Condé") decided to lay siege to Thionville, the most important fortress on the southern border of the Spanish Netherlands, after requesting (or rather, demanding) and obtaining authorization from the regent government of Anne of Austria and Cardinal Mazarin.

From Rocroi, Condé ordered the Marquis de Gesvres, who commanded an army corps in Champagne, to advance on the walls of Thionville as quickly as possible. This general arrived there on June 16, and two days later, Condé joined him, by which time the siege had already begun.

The Spanish general Jean de Beck was sent to Thionville and was able to strengthen the garrison before it was completely cut off. He remained near the city throughout the entire siege, but did not have enough men to relieve the city.

== The Siege ==
The siege began on June 16.
By July 18, the Picardy, La Marine, and Gramont-Liégeois regiments had captured the Counterscarp. The Besieged defended themselves bravely, repelled two attacks, and even launched a counterattack.

But by early August the main bastions of the town were mined. Condé had the Spaniards informed of their situation, which they had not yet fully grasped. The besieged requested to inspect the miners' work, and Condé agreed. When they saw for themselves that Condé had told the truth and that they had no hope of rescue, they offered their surrender. On August 8, they were granted honorable terms.

At the end of the siege, the garrison of Thionville had been reduced to 1,200 men, representing a loss of 1,600. Furthermore, the governor and the town's mayor had been killed. The surrender, granted by Condé, was signed on August 8 by him and by Sergeant major Dorio, who had become commander after the governor's death.

The French losses are not known, but were also heavy. The Marquis de Gesvres had been killed and Marshal Jean de Gassion was severely injured.

== Aftermath ==
The town lay largely in ruins; only a few houses remained undamaged. The garrison of Thionville left the city by noon on August 10, taking their wounded and baggage with them.

To secure his conquest, Condé occupied Sierck, a small town on the right bank of the Moselle River northeast of Thionville. Sierck, however, was not under Spanish control, but rather under the command of Duke Charles IV of Lorraine, a longtime enemy of France.

Cavalry Colonel Antoine-Joachim, Baron de Marolles, was appointed governor of Thionville by Condé. This appointment was confirmed by the court, and he remained in this function until 1655.
