= Sant'Agnese fuori le mura =

Catholic basilica and a landmark of Rome, Italy

Saint Agnes Outside the Wall
- Titulus S. Agnetis extra moenia (Latin)
- Sant'Agnese fuori le mura (Italian)
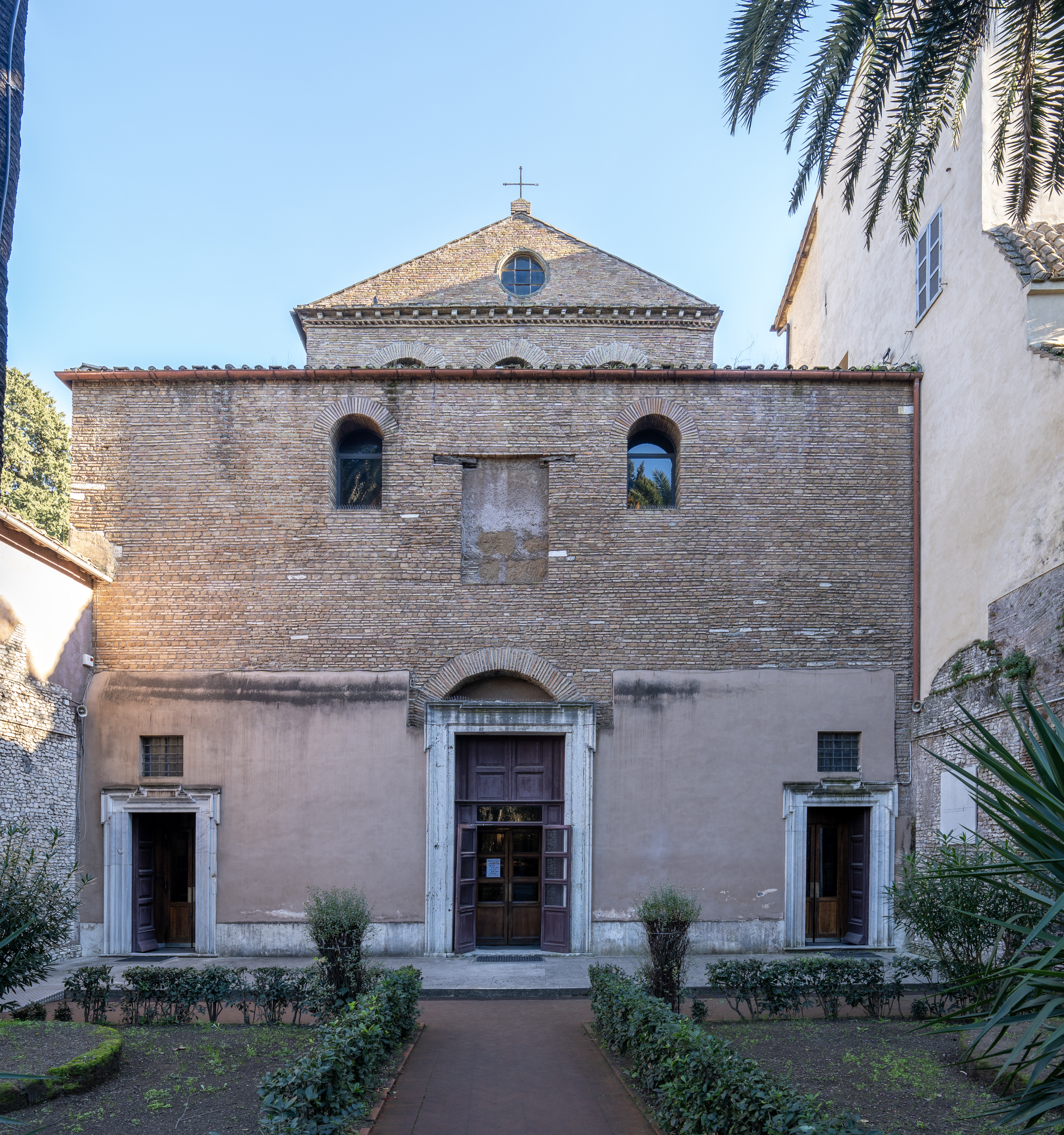
- Facade
- Click on the map for a fullscreen view
- 41°55′23″N 12°31′08″E
- Location: Rome
- Address: Via Nomentana, 349
- Country: Italy
- Denomination: Catholic Church
- Sui iuris church: Latin Church
- Religious order: Canons Regular of the Lateran
- Website: www.santagnese.com (Parish website) www.santagnese.org (Archeological website)

History
- Status: Titular church, minor basilica, parish church
- Dedication: Saint Agnes

Architecture
- Architectural type: Byzantine
- Groundbreaking: 4th century AD
- Completed: 7th century AD

Saint Agnes Outside the Walls (Italian: Sant'Agnese fuori le mura) is a titular church and minor basilica in Rome located on a slope descending from the Via Nomentana. The church stands above the Catacombs of Saint Agnes, where the saint was originally buried and which remain accessible from the church. A larger basilica of the same name was built nearby in the 4th century; its ruins can still be seen near Santa Costanza. The present church was constructed by Pope Honorius I in the 7th century and largely preserves its original structure. Notably, the apse mosaic depicting Saint Agnes, Honorius, and another unidentified pope remains mostly intact.

== History ==
A very large basilica was built some metres from the present church in the 4th century, to which was attached the large private mausoleum for Constantina, the daughter of Constantine I. The mausoleum was later converted into a church, which survives and is now known as Santa Costanza (she was venerated as a saint, even though she was not one officially). It contains very important 4th century mosaics, especially large areas of ceiling in a secular style, but also two small apse mosaics, one including an early depiction of Jesus in what has become the standard style of long fair hair and a halo.

The large basilica decayed during the decline of Rome, and was replaced in the 7th century by the present much smaller church, commissioned by Pope Honorius I. The lower part of the walls from about half of one side of the Constantinian basilica, and its apse, can still be seen. The new church was over what was believed to be Agnes's grave. The floor level of the 7th-century church is some two metres above the level of the catacomb floor, and the public street entrances are at the level of the 2nd floor gallery. A long wide internal set of steps, lined with inscriptions from the catacombs and other ancient buildings set into the walls, leads down from the street level to the floor level of the church. The apse mosaic from Honorius's time is still present, and less affected by restoration than most mosaics of this date. On a gold ground, a central standing figure of Agnes in the costume of a Byzantine empress is flanked by Honorius, offering a model of the building, and another pope, whose identity is uncertain. The church was also built with a separate upper gallery for women (matronaeum), similar to that of San Lorenzo fuori le mura. Saint Emerentiana was also buried here.

The catacombs are on three levels, dating from the 2nd to the 5th centuries; part of the highest level dating to the 2nd century can be visited by a guided tour. Though no paintings remain in place, there are a number of inscriptions and engraved images of interest. Many more inscriptions line the large staircase leading from the main convent above to the church.

It is in this church that on the feast day of St. Agnes (January 21), two lambs are specially blessed, usually by the pope after a pontifical high Mass; their wool is later woven into pallia, ceremonial neck-stoles sent by the popes to newly elevated Metropolitan-archbishops to symbolise their union with the papacy.

The church was assigned to the Canons Regular of the Lateran by Pope Innocent VIII in 1489; and they continued to serve it after Pope Clement XI made it a parish church in 1708. It is the headquarters of the primaria sodality of the Children of Mary, founded here in 1864.

On March 4, 2026 it was announced a bust of Jesus Christ which has been in the basilica for centuries had been re-attributed to Michelangelo.

== In legend and literature ==
The church is the topic of Canadian author and anthropologist Margaret Visser's book The Geometry of Love, published in 2000, which describes it in exhaustive detail and discusses aspects of history, theology, architecture, symbolism and the emotional and aesthetic effects of visiting the church.

== List of cardinal priests ==
S. Agnese fuori le mura was established as a titular church for a cardinal priest on 5 October 1654 by Pope Innocent X. The following is a list of cardinal priests:

Image	Name	Dates	Notes
	Baccio Aldobrandini	5 Oct 1654 – 1 Apr 1658	Transferred to Santi Nereo ed Achilleo
	Girolamo Farnese	6 May 1658 – 18 Feb 1668	Died
	Vitaliano Visconti	18 Mar 1669 – 7 Sept 1671	Died
	Federico Borromeo	8 Aug 1672 – 18 Feb 1673	Died
	Toussaint de Forbin-Janson	10 Jul 1690 – 28 Sept 1693	Transferred to San Callisto
	Giambattista Spínola	20 Feb 1696 – 7 Apr 1698	Transferred to Santa Maria in Trastevere
	Rannuzio Pallavicino	25 Jun 1706 – 30 Jun 1712	Died
	Giorgio Spinola	20 Jan 1721 – 15 Dec 1734	Transferred to Santa Maria in Trastevere
	Serafino Cenci	27 Jun 1735 – 24 Jun 1740	Died
	Filippo Maria Monti	23 Sept 1743 – 10 Apr 1747	Transferred to Santo Stefano al Monte Celio
	Frédéric Jérôme de La Rochefoucauld	15 May 1747 – 29 Apr 1757	Died
	Étienne-René Potier de Gesvres	2 Aug 1758 – 24 Jul 1774	Died
	Luigi Valenti Gonzaga	30 Mar 1778 – 29 Nov 1790	Transferred to Santi Nereo ed Achilleo
	Giuseppe Spina	24 May 1802 – 21 Feb 1820	Appointed Cardinal Bishop of Palestrina
	Dionisio Bardají y Azara	27 Sept 1822 – 3 Dec 1826	Died
	Ignazio Nasalli-Ratti	17 Sept 1822 – 2 Dec 1831	Died
	Filippo Giudice Caracciolo	30 Sept 1833 – 29 Jan 1844	Died
	Hugues de La Tour d'Auvergne-Lauraguais	16 Apr 1846 – 20 Jul 1851	Died
	Gerolamo Marquese d'Andrea	18 Mar 1852 – 14 May 1868	Died
	Lorenzo Barili	24 Sept 1868 – 8 Mar 1875	Died
	Pietro Giannelli	31 Mar 1875 – 5 Nov 1881	Died
	Charles Lavigerie	3 Jul 1882 – 26 Nov 1892	Died
	Georg von Kopp	19 Jan 1893 – 4 Mar 1914	Died
	Károly Hornig	28 May 1914 – 9 Feb 1917	Died
	Adolf Bertram	18 Dec 1919 – 6 jul 1945	Died
	Samuel Stritch	22 Feb 1946 – 27 May 1958	Died
	Carlo Confalonieri	18 Dec 1958 – 15 Mar 1972	Appointed Cardinal Bishop of Palestrina
	Louis-Jean Guyot	5 Mar 1973 – 1 Aug 1988	Died
	Camillo Ruini	28 Jun 1991 – 16 June 2026	Died

== Gallery ==
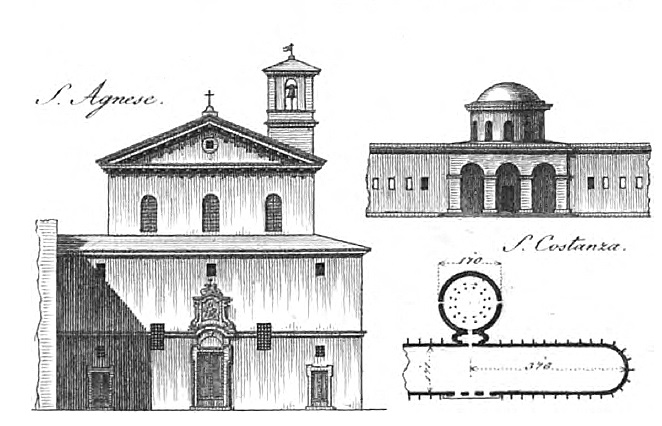
Floorplan and elevation

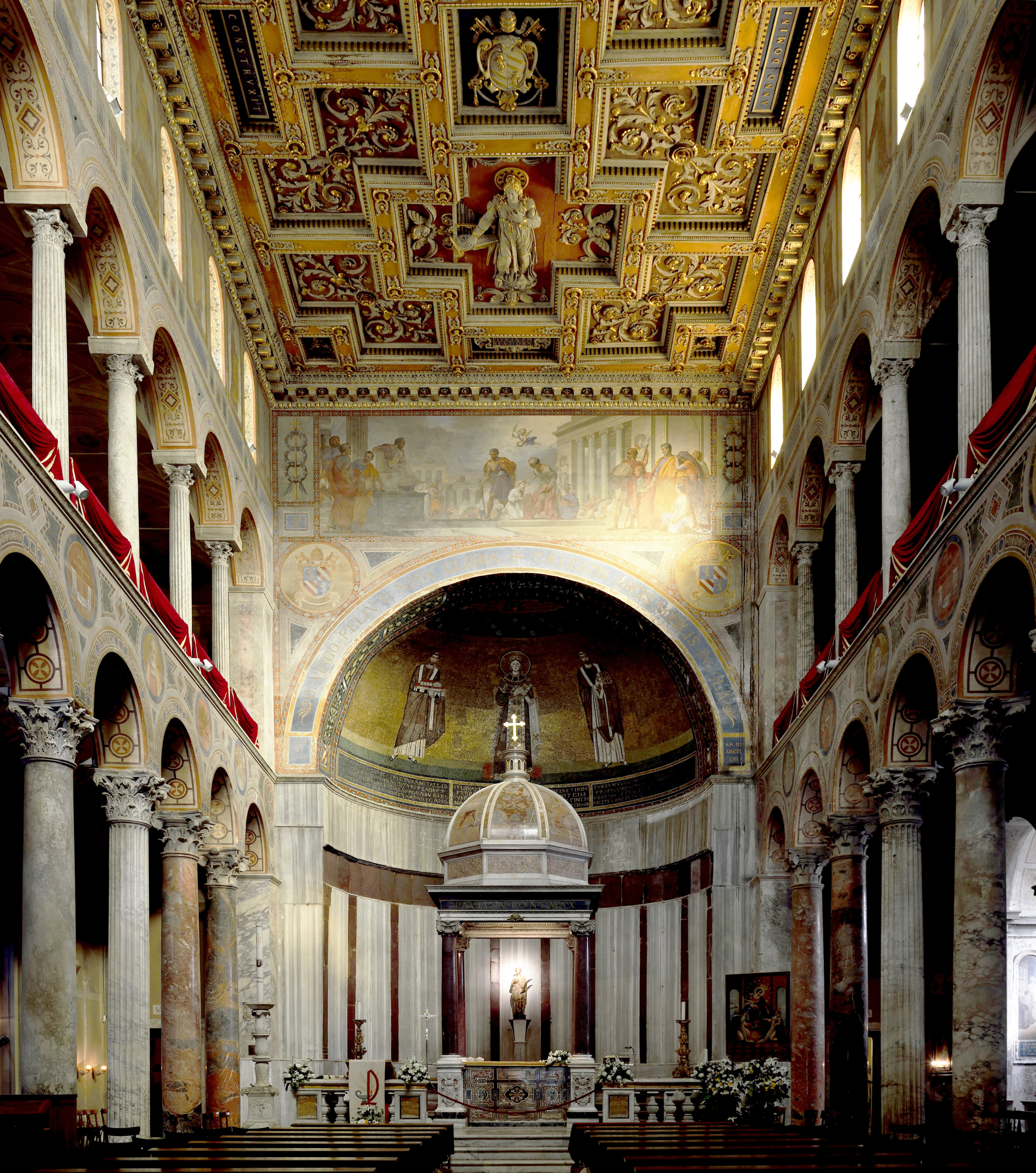
Interior

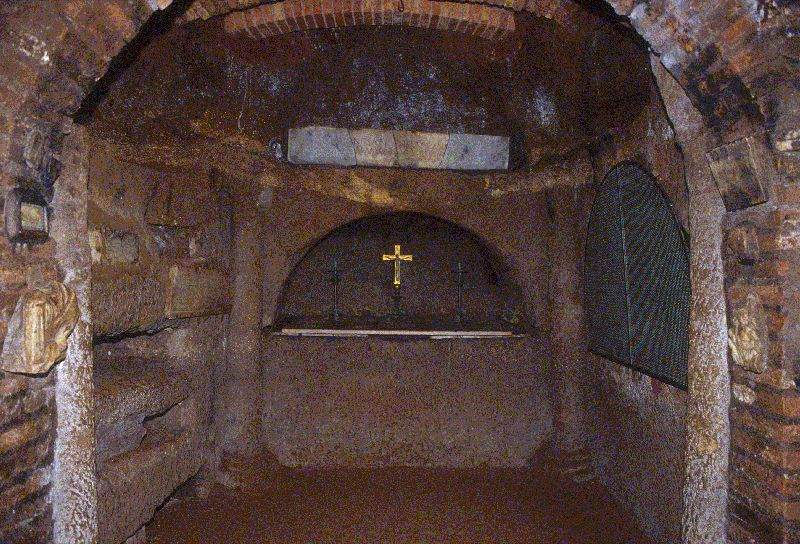
Catacombs of Saint Agnes

Preceded by San Lorenzo fuori le mura	Landmarks of Rome; Sant'Agnese fuori le mura	Succeeded by Sant'Agostino
