= Jean de Gassion =

Gascon military commander

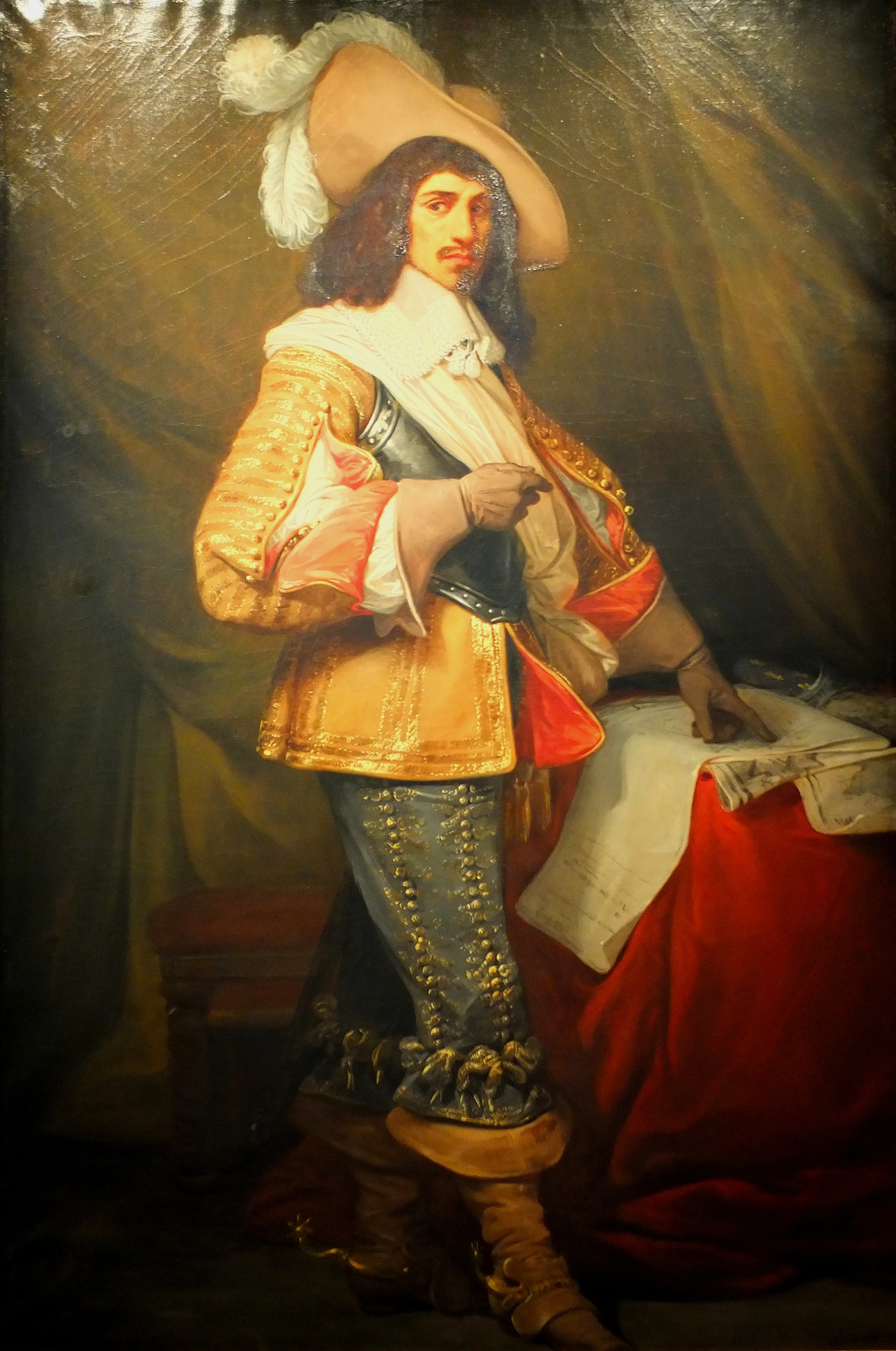
Jean, comte de Gassion.

Jean, comte de Gassion (1609 Pau - 1647 Lens) was a Gascon military commander for France, prominent at the battle of Rocroi (1643) who reached the rank of Marshal of France at the age of thirty-four. He served Louis XIII and Louis XIV and died of wounds sustained during the 1647 siege of Lens (not to be confused with the Battle of Lens the following year).

== Biography ==
Cardinal Richelieu called him la Guerre ("War") and commandeered his services which had proved valuable to Gustavus Adolphus, one of the renovators of new cavalry tactics in the West. Fortuitously, he was present as a cavalry commander under the young duc d'Enghien, Louis II de Bourbon, the Grand Condé several days after the death of Louis XIII; Gassion was a crucial factor in the French success at Rocroi against combined Habsburg forces. De Gassion's role was gracefully acknowledged by Condé.
