= Isaac Manasses de Pas, Marquis de Feuquieres =

French military general (1590-1640)

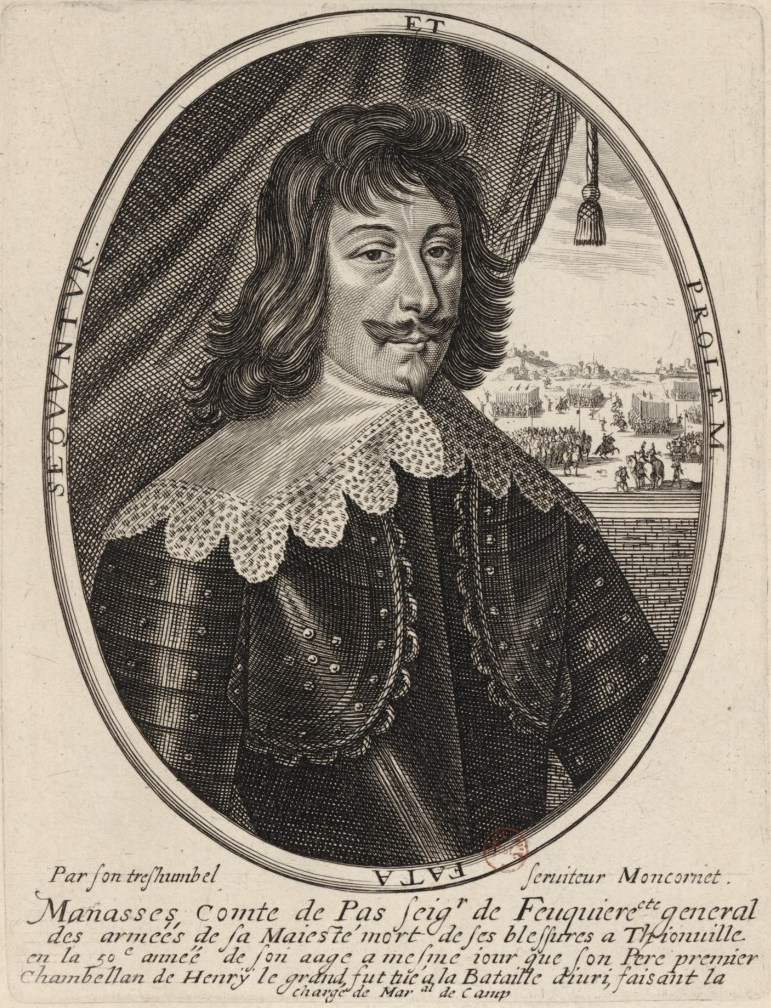
Isaac Manasses Portrait

Isaac Manasses de Pas, Marquis de Feuquieres (1 June 1590 – 13 March 1640) was a French soldier.

He came of a distinguished family of which many members held high command in the civil wars of the 16th century. He entered the Royal army at the age of thirty, and soon achieved distinction. In 1626 he served in the Valtellina, and in 1628–1629 at the celebrated siege of La Rochelle, where he was taken prisoner. In 1629 he was made Marechal de camp, and served in the fighting on the southern frontiers of France.

After occupying various military positions in Lorraine, he was sent as an ambassador into Germany, where he rendered important services in negotiations with Wallenstein. In 1636 he commanded the French corps operating with the Bernard of Weimar's forces (afterwards Turenne's Army of Weimar). With these troops he served in the campaigns of 1637 (in which he became lieutenant-general), 1638 and 1639. At the siege of Thionville (Diedenhofen) he was captured by Imperial relief forces under Ottavio Piccolomini and died from his wounds in captivity.

His lettres inédites appeared (ed. Gallois) in Paris in 1845.

His grandson Antoine Manasses de Pas, Marquis de Feuquieres (1648–1711) was also a notable military leader.
