= Duke of Gesvres =

Title in the peerage of France

The Duke of Gesvres (Fr.: duc de Gesvres) was a title in the peerage of France from 1670 to 1794, named after Gesvres in northwestern France.

== Background ==
The title of Baron of Gesvres first came to the Potier family with the marriage of Jacques Potier (died 1555) to Françoise Cueillette, daughter of Jean, seigneur de Freschines et de Gesvres. Their son, Louis Potier inherited this title. From 1608, however, Louis Potier was known as the Count of Tresmes, and his son, René Potier, succeeded in elevating the title to Duke of Tresmes.

In 1670, René Potier's son Léon Potier (who became Duke of Tresmes in 1669) changed the name of the title to "Duke of Gesvres". Thereafter, the Dukes of Gesvres were sometimes known as the "Duke of Tresmes and Gesvres" and the eldest son of the Duke of Gesvres sometimes used the title "Duke of Tresmes" as a courtesy title and the younger sons sometimes used "Count of Tresmes". The title was abolished at the time of the French Revolution when the last Duke of Gesvres was guillotined.

== List of dukes of Gesvres ==
From	To	Duke of Gesvres
1670	1704	Léon Potier
1704	1739	François-Bernard Potier
1739	1774	Louis-Léon Marie Potier
1774	1794	Louis-Joachim Paris Potier
