= Paul Giannelli =

American lawyer

- Born: May 21, 1945 (age 80)
- Education: Providence College (BA); University of Virginia (JD, LLM); George Washington University (BS)
- Occupations: Lawyer; consultant; law professor

Paul Giannelli (born May 21, 1945) is an American lawyer, consultant and law professor. He is a leading expert on scientific and forensic evidence. He is currently a Distinguished University Professor and the Albert J. Weatherhead III & Richard W. Weatherhead Professor Emeritus of Law at Case Western Reserve University School of Law.

== Education ==
Giannelli received his Bachelor of Arts, summa cum laude, from Providence College. He then received his Juris Doctor from the University of Virginia where he was an editor of the Virginia Law Review. He also received a Master of Science in Forensic Science from George Washington University and Master of Law from the University of Virginia.

== Career ==
Giannelli was both a prosecutor and defense counsel in the military before becoming a legal academic.

== Scholarship ==
The New York Times has called him an “expert on scientific evidence” and The Washington Post and PBS have called him an "evidence and procedure expert".

At law school, he has taught numerous courses on Evidence, Scientific Evidence, Wrongful Convictions Seminar, Advanced Evidence Seminar, Criminal Procedure, Criminal Process, Criminal Law, Capital Punishment Seminar, Juvenile Law, Corrections & Prisoners’ Rights Seminar, and Trial Practice.

He is a Fellow of the American Academy of Forensic Sciences and served on the National Commission on Forensic Science.
