= Pietro Giannelli =

Roman Catholic Cardinal

His Eminence Pietro Giannelli
- Cardinal-Priest of Sant'Agnese fuori le mura
- Church: Roman Catholic Church
- Appointed: 31 March 1875
- Term ended: 5 November 1881
- Predecessor: Lorenzo Barili
- Successor: Charles-Martial Allemand-Lavigerie
- Previous posts: Titular Archbishop of Sardes (1858-75); Secretary for Seminaries of the Congregation of the Council (1861-68); Secretary of the Congregation of the Council (1868-75)

Orders
- Ordination: 3 October 1830 by Niccola Mazzoni
- Consecration: 6 June 1858 by Costantino Patrizi Naro
- Created cardinal: 15 March 1875 by Pope Pius IX
- Rank: Cardinal-Priest

Personal details
- Born: Pietro Giannelli; 11 August 1807 Terni, Papal States
- Died: 5 November 1881 (aged 74) Rome, Kingdom of Italy
- Parents: Pietro Giannelli; Olimpia Petroni

Pietro Giannelli (11 August 1807 – 5 November 1881) was an Italian prelate who was elevated to the cardinalate in 1875.
