= Lords, counts and dukes of Tresmes =

Title in the peerage of France from 1648 to 1670

Shield of the Duke of Tresmes

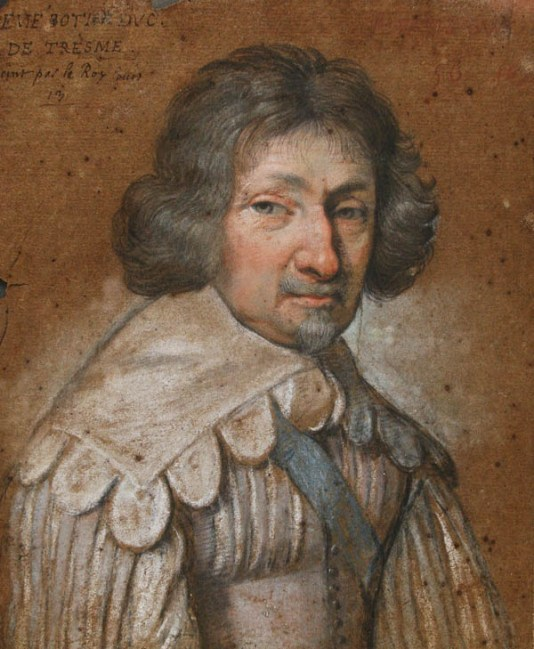
René Potier, who was Duke of Tresmes from 1648 to 1669 (portrait by Louis XIII).

The Duke of Tresmes (French: duc de Tresmes) was a title in the peerage of France from 1648 to 1670, at which point the title was changed to Duke of Gesvres. Thereafter, the Duke of Gesvres was sometimes referred to as the "Duke of Tresmes and Gesvres" and the title "Duke of Tresmes" was used as a courtesy title for the eldest son of the Duke of Gesvres and "Count of Tresmes" for younger sons.

== History ==
The seigneury of Tresmes belonged to the Baillet family until the title fell to Charlotte Baillet, who married Louis Potier, Baron of Gesvres. Louis Potier succeeded in having the title raised to the title of Count of Tresmes (Fr. comte de Tresmes) in 1608. Their son René succeeded in having the title raised to Duke of Tresmes in 1648, and this title then passed to his son in 1669. The title was changed to "Duke of Gesvres" in 1670.

=== Lords of Tresmes (1579) ===
- 1579–1579: René Baillet, 1st Lord of Tresmes
- 1579–1608 Louis Potier, created Count of Tresmes in 1608

=== Counts of Tresmes (1608) ===
- 1608–1630: Louis Potier
- 1630–1648: René Potier, created Duke of Tresmes in 1648

=== Dukes of Tresmes (1648) ===
- 1648–1669: René Potier
- 1669–1670: Léon Potier
