= Léon Potier de Gesvres =

French Catholic cardinal

His Eminence Léon Potier de Gesvres
- Archbishop of Bourges
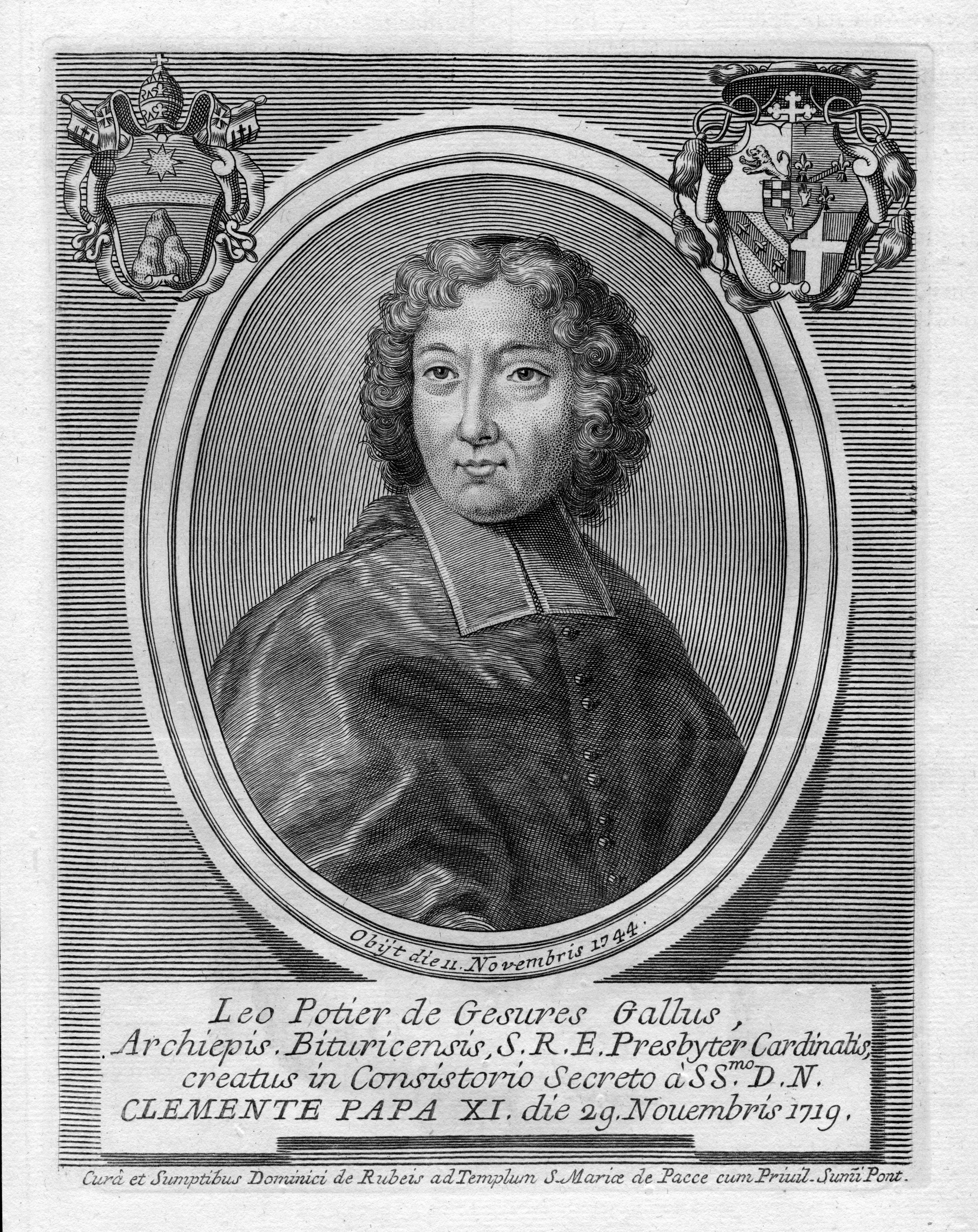
- Church: Catholic Church
- Archdiocese: Bourges
- Installed: 30 August 1694
- Term ended: 5 March 1729
- Predecessor: Michel Phélypeaux de La Vrillière
- Successor: Frédéric-Jérôme de La Rochefoucauld

Orders
- Consecration: 23 January 1695 by César d'Estrées
- Created cardinal: 29 November 1719 by Pope Clement XI

Personal details
- Born: 15 August 1656 Paris, Kingdom of France
- Died: 12 November 1744 (aged 88)
- Coat of arms: Léon Potier de Gesvres's coat of arms

Ordination history
History
Episcopal consecration
- Principal consecrator: César d'Estrées
- Co-consecrators: Jacques Potier de Novion, François Bochart de Saron
Cardinalate
- Elevated by: Pope Clement XI
Episcopal succession
Bishops consecrated by Léon Potier de Gesvres as principal consecrator
- François de Carbonnel de Canisy: 25 March 1696

Léon Potier de Gesvres (15 August 1656 – 12 November 1744) was a French Roman Catholic prelate and Cardinal.

== Biography ==
He was the second son of Léon Potier, Duke of Gesvres, Peer of France, and Marie-Françoise du Val.

He became Abbot commendatario of the Bernay Abbey in 1666 and the Aurillac Abbey in 1679. He served as the Archbishop of the Archdiocese of Bourges from 1694 to 1729. He never resided in his archdiocese and visited it only a few times.

He was created Cardinal-priest in the consistory of 29 November 1719. Pope Clement XI sent him the red hat with an apostolic brief of 23 December 1719. After his appointment, Potier never went to Rome, neither did he participate in any of the four conclaves (1721, 1724, 1730, 1740) celebrated during his cardinalate.
According to Saint-Simon, Potier was a hypochondriac who never did anything..

He was also Abbot commendatario of the Abbey of Saint-Amand (1720-1744) and Saint-Remy, Reims (1728-1744).
He was Commander in the Order of the Holy Spirit (1724).
