= Battle of Lens =

1648 battle of the Thirty Years' War

- Part of the Thirty Years' War and the Franco-Spanish War (1635–59)
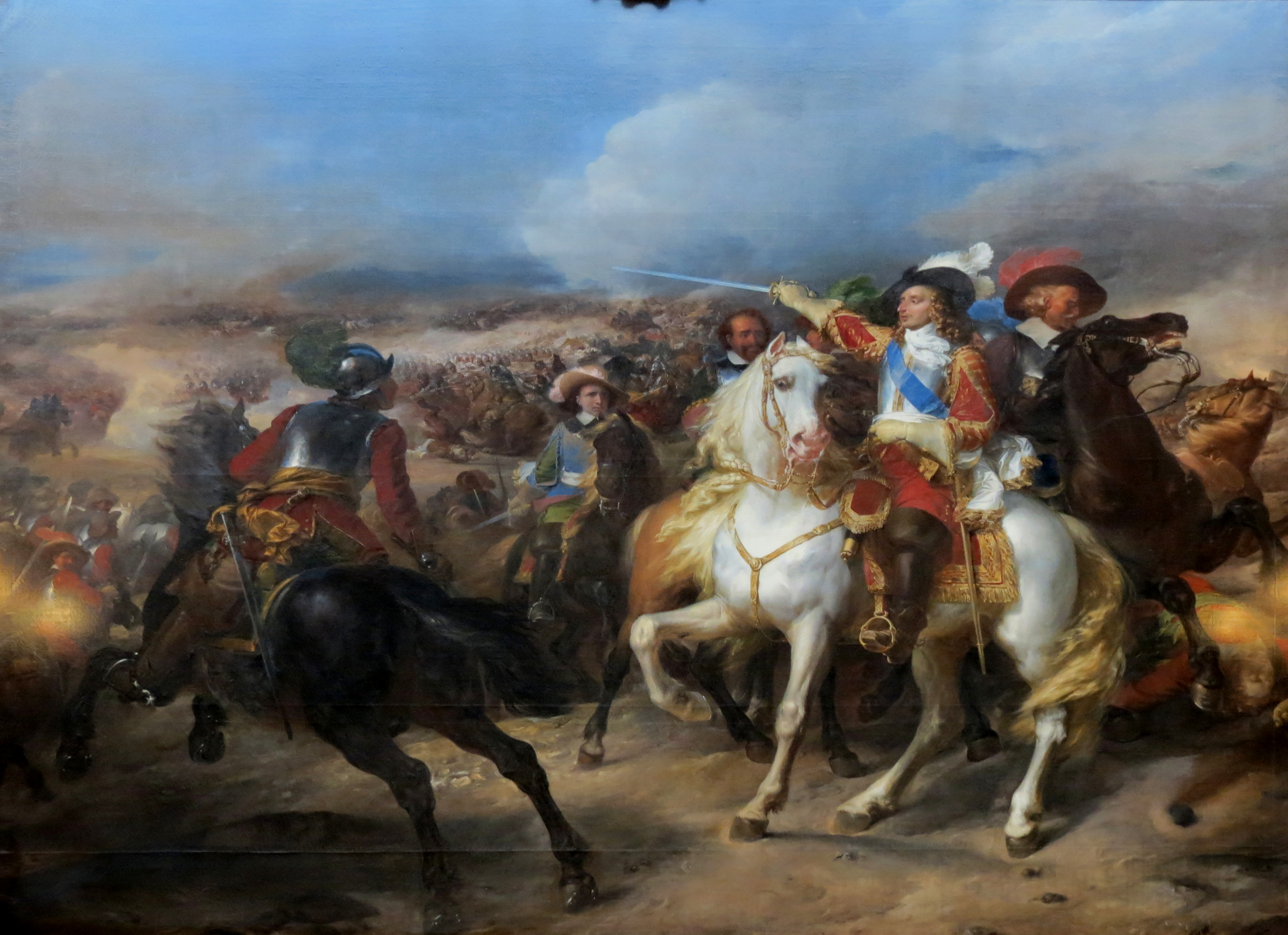
- Louis, Grand Condé at the battle of Lens, 20 August 1648, victory over the Spanish troops commanded by archduke Leopold. Jean-Pierre Franque, 1841, Galerie des Batailles.
Date	20 August 1648
Location	Between Grenay and Liévin, west of Lens, Pas-de-Calais (France) 50°25′N 2°50′E
Result	French victory

Belligerents
France	Spanish Empire; Army of Lorraine

Commanders and leaders
(Kingdom of France) Grand Condé (Kingdom of France) Antoine de Gramont (Kingdom of France) Johann Ludwig von Erlach (Kingdom of France) Henri de La Ferte	(Spanish Empire) Archduke Leopold Wilhelm (Spanish Empire) Jean de Beck (DOW) (Duchy of Lorraine) Count of Ligniville

Strength
16,000; 7,000 infantry; 9,000 cavalry; 18 guns	18,000; 9,000 infantry; 9,000 cavalry; 38 guns

Casualties and losses
1,500–4,000 killed or wounded	8,000–10,000 killed, wounded or captured 38 guns 100 flags

The Battle of Lens (20 August 1648) was the last major battle of the Thirty Years' War (1618–1648). A French force commanded by Louis, Grand Condé defeated a Spanish army under Archduke Leopold Wilhelm. The battle cemented the reputation of Condé as one of the greatest generals of his age.

Over the four years following the decisive French victory at Rocroi against the Spanish Army of Flanders, the French captured dozens of towns throughout northern France and the Spanish Netherlands. Archduke Leopold Wilhelm was appointed governor of the Spanish Netherlands in 1647 to strengthen Spain's Habsburg alliance with Austria, and began a major counteroffensive the same year. The Spanish army first found success recapturing the fortresses of Armentières, Comines and Landrecies.

The Prince de Condé was recalled from a failed campaign in Catalonia against the Spanish and appointed commander of the 16,000-man French army opposite the Spanish army of the Archduke and General Jean de Beck, the governor of Luxembourg. Condé captured Ypres but then the 18,000-strong Spanish-German force laid siege to Lens. Condé advanced to meet them.

In the battle that ensued, Condé provoked the Spanish into giving up a strong hilltop position for an open plain, where he used the discipline and superior close-combat capabilities of his cavalry to charge and rout the Walloon-Lorrainer cavalry on the Spanish wings. The French infantry and cavalry in the center were attacked by the strong Spanish center, suffering heavy losses but holding their ground. The French cavalry on the wings, freed from any opposition, encircled and charged the Spanish center, who promptly capitulated. The Spanish lost half their army, some 8,000–9,000 men of which 3,000 were killed or wounded and 5,000–6,000 captured, 38 guns, 100 flags along with their pontoon bridges and baggage. French losses were 1,500 to 4,480 killed and wounded. The French victory contributed to the signing of the Peace of Westphalia but the outbreak of the Fronde rebellion prevented the French from exploiting their victory to the hilt against the Spanish.

== Background ==
Lens is a fortified city in the historic region of Flanders, today a major city in the Pas-de-Calais region of northern France. The city had been captured by the French in 1647.

The Prince de Condé rushed from Catalonia to Flanders, and an army was cobbled together from Champagne, Lorraine, and Paris. The French army consisted of 16,000 men, 7,000 infantry and 9,000 cavalry, as well as 18 guns. The Spanish army was larger, comprising 18,000 men of equal halves of infantry and cavalry and 38 guns.

Leopold captured Lens on 17 August.

== Prelude ==
On 20 August the opposing armies drew up west of Lens; the Spanish held a strong defensive position on the high ground. Leopold Wilhelm did not intend to fight a battle, as four of his cavalry regiments were out foraging.

=== French Army ===
The French right wing under Condé himself had 17 cavalry squadrons in two echelons. The center under Chatillon comprised 12 infantry battalions and six squadrons of cavalry. Commanded by Marshal Antoine Gramont, the left wing was composed of 16 cavalry squadrons. Six cavalry squadrons made up the reserve under Johann Ludwig von Erlach. Formation-wise, the 12 infantry battalions were drawn up in lines eight ranks-deep, with each battalion having a strength of 600–700 men. The cavalry was in 45 squadrons of 200 horsemen, their ranks four or five-deep. The French artillery, 18 guns-strong, was commanded the Comte de Cossé.

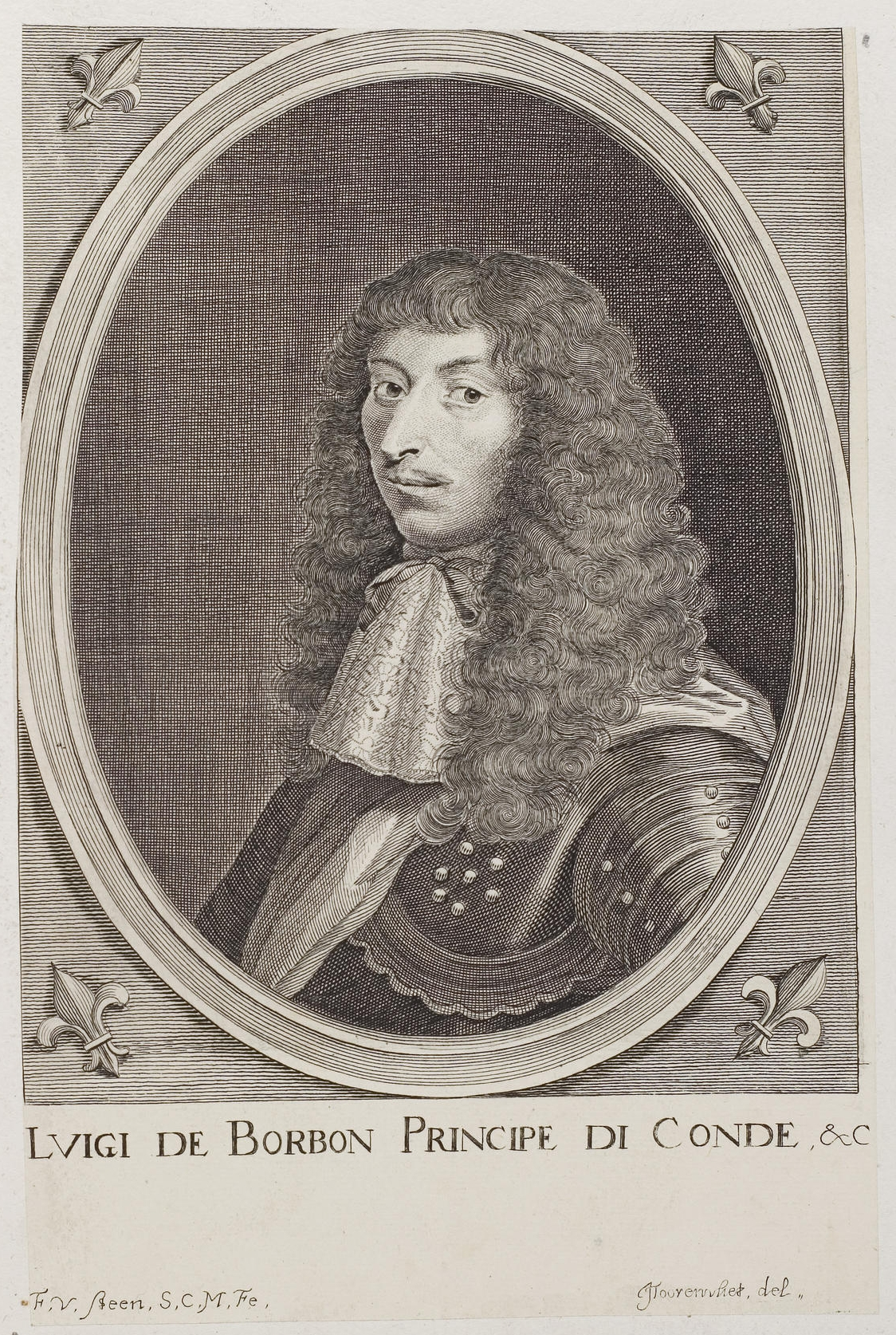
General Louis de Bourbon-Condé

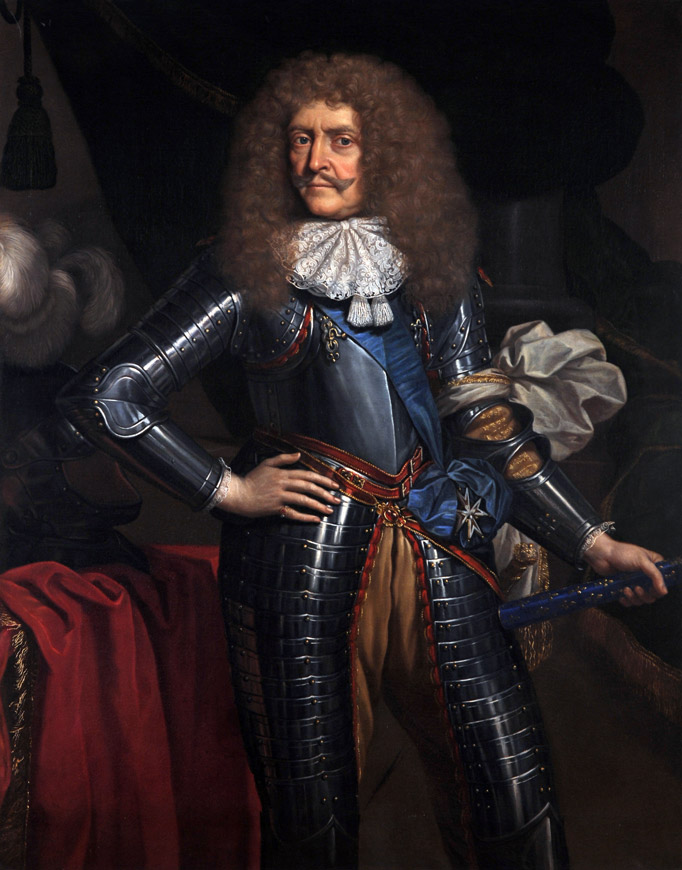
Marshal Antoine de Gramont

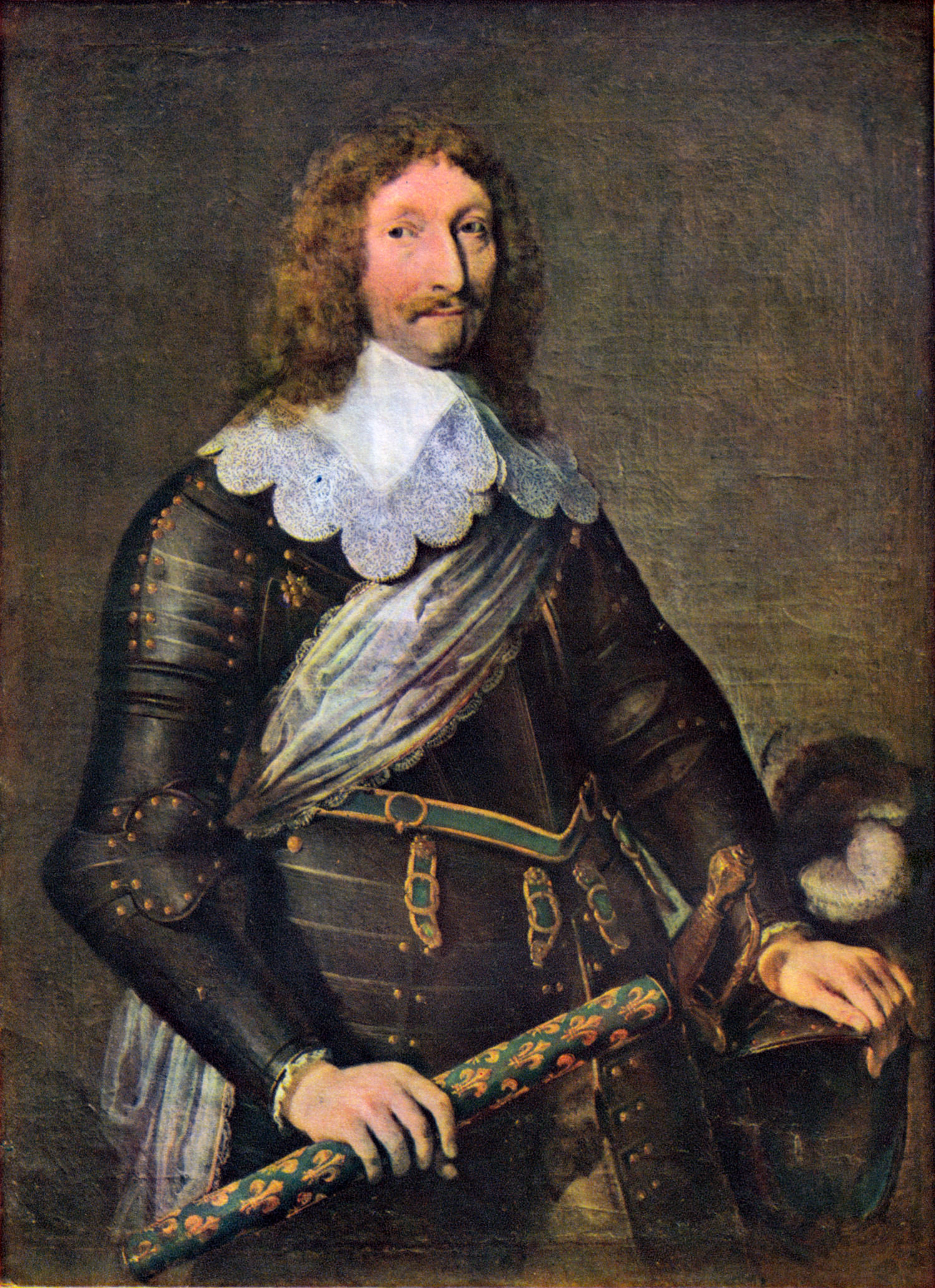
General Johann Ludwig von Erlach

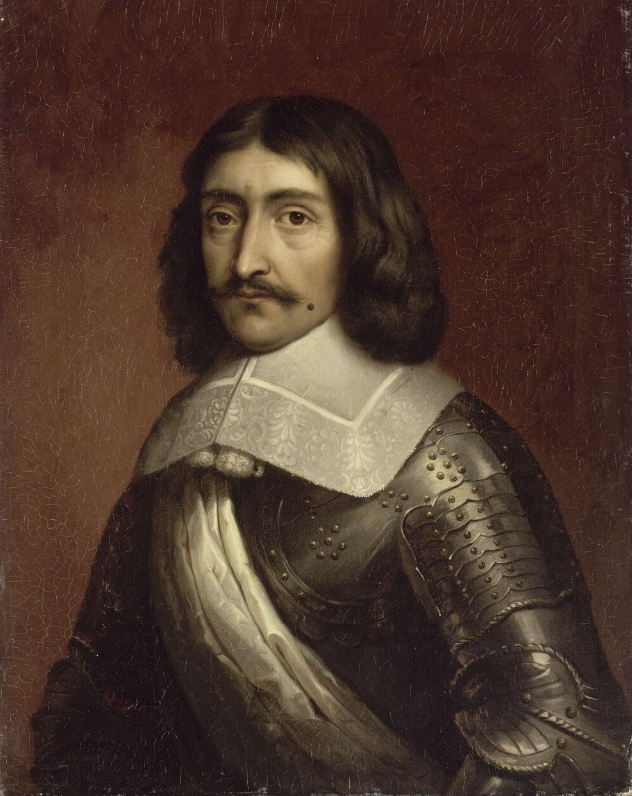
General Henri de La Ferté-Senneterre

=== Spanish Army ===
The Spanish also had their infantry in the center and the cavalry on the wings, all three commands in two echelons as well. 27 companies of Walloon cavalry composed the right wing under Bucquoy. The center was the strongest part of the battle array, with 16 infantry battalions and 15 cavalry squadrons under the governor of Luxembourg, Major General Jean de Beck. The 13 center squadrons were deployed in 4 groups in the intervals of the infantry battalions. Ligniville on the left had 20 squadrons of Lorrainer cavalry. The course of the battle would reveal Beck's mistake in putting too much cavalry in the center and not enough on the right. The Spanish army used deeper, Imperial-style formations of 10 ranks for its 16 smaller infantry battalions of 500–600 men. The 62 cavalry squadrons were also smaller than those of the French, with a strength of 100–200 men. Their ranks were four or five deep like those of their French counterparts. Unlike the French, the Spanish cavalry did not normally charge enemy cavalry at a gallop sword in hand, preferring to receive enemy charges standing still with carbine salvos at point blank range instead. This would prove inferior to the French tactic of all out charges.

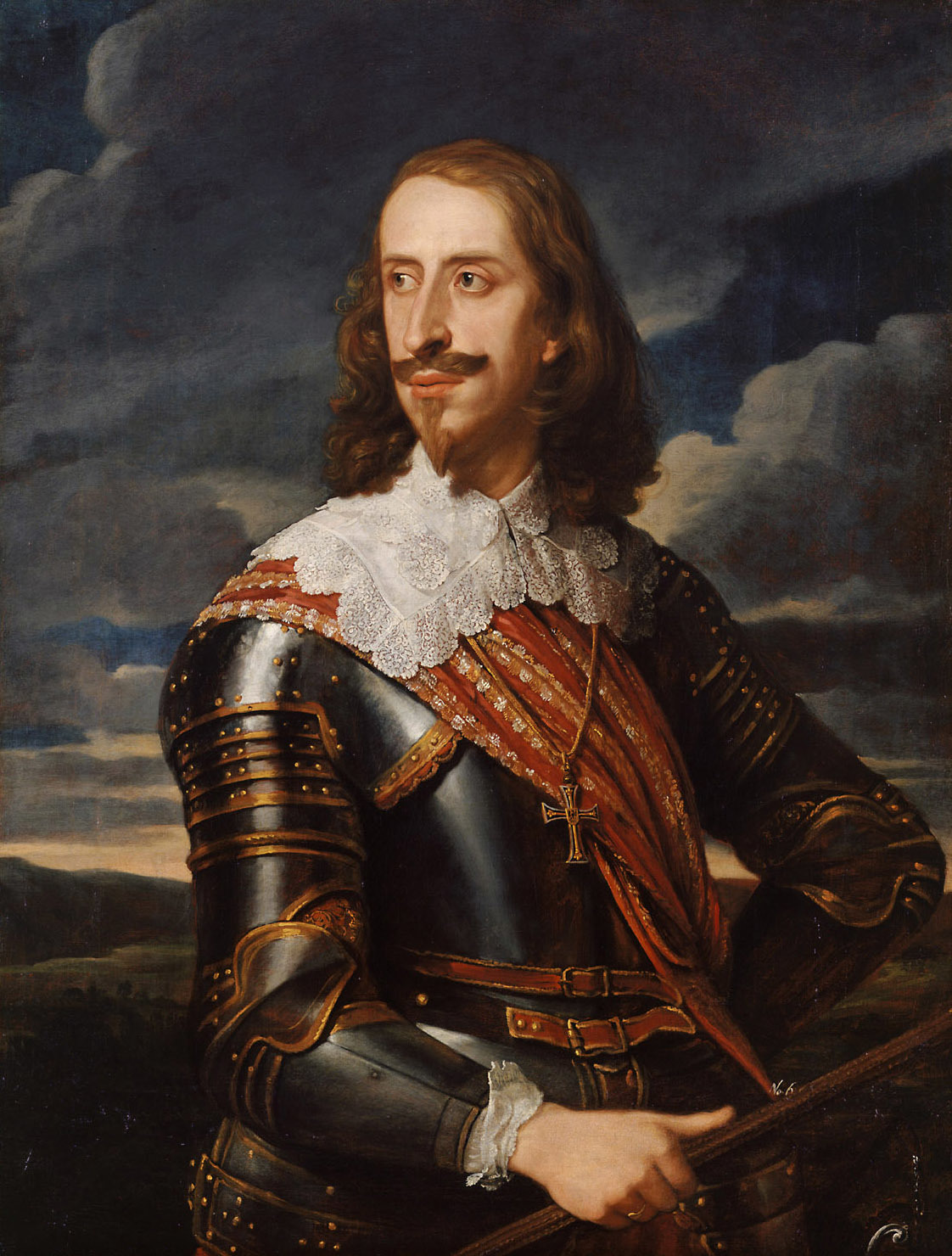
Archduke Leopold Wilhelm

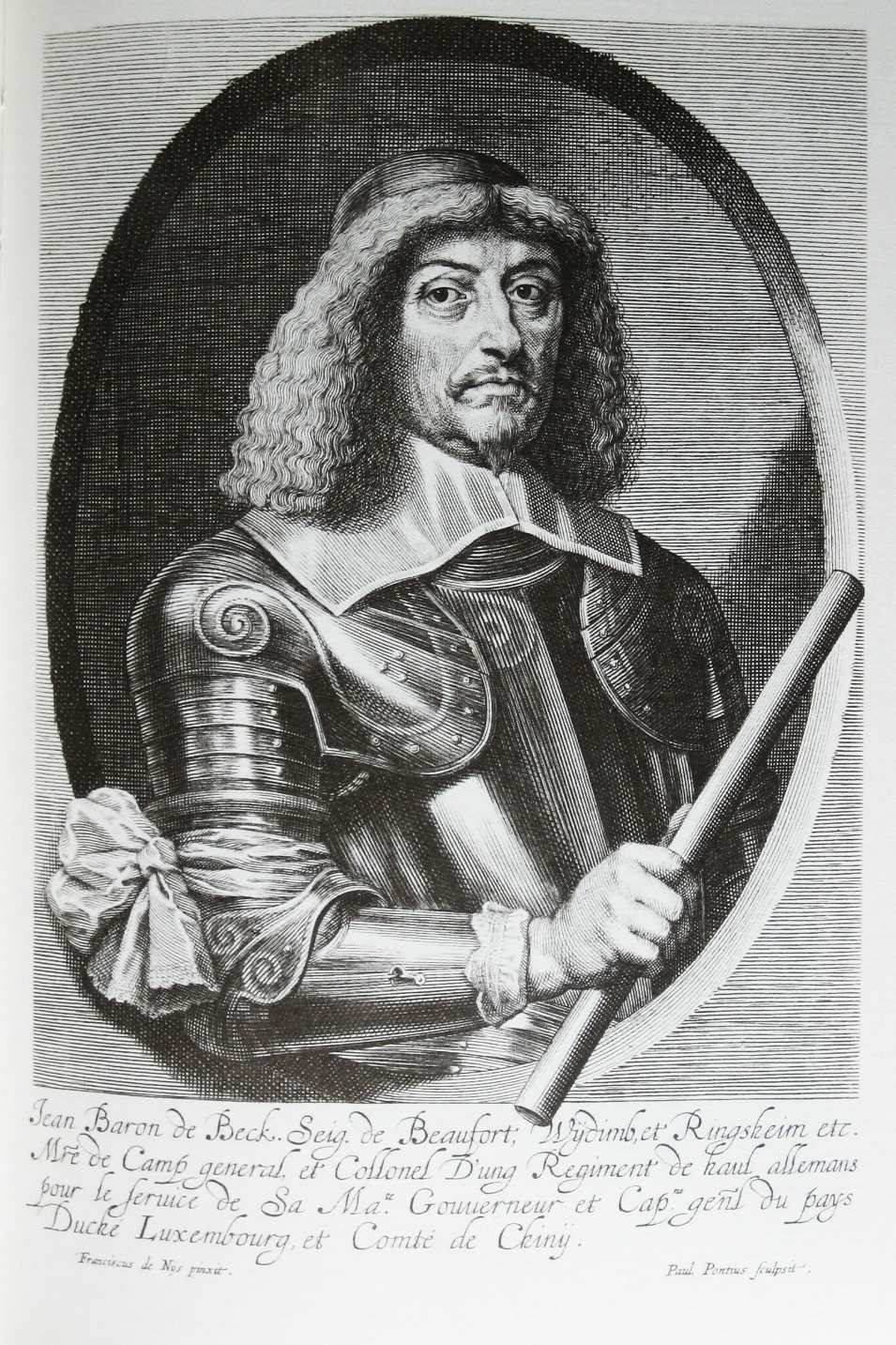
General Jean de Beck

== Battle ==
=== Preliminaries ===
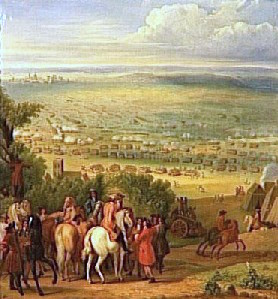
The Battle of Lens. Contemporary illustration, oil on canvas.

Condé saw the strength of the Spanish position and decided not to attack it head-on. His army had been in battle array the entire previous day and had not eaten. There was no food, fodder or water in the place, so he decided to retreat to the village of Neus some two hours march away. There he could obtain supplies from Béthune, where he had left his baggage train, and be in position to intercept the Spanish army's movements. At least two officers from Condé's army reported that Condé retreat was a planned feint to draw the Spanish into the open for battle.

=== Beck's attack ===
At 5 a.m. six guns from Cossé's artillery park fired a volley on the Spanish and the French began to retreat while still in battle formation, with the right-wing making up the rearguard. General Beck's Lorrainers suddenly attacked the isolated, 10-squadron-strong French rearguard under Villequier and Noirmoutier and routed them. Condé's page was wounded and captured and Condé himself only narrowly escaped being killed or captured. The Picardie infantry regiment came up to support the French rearguard and helped to rally them. At 6:30 a.m., Beck advised the Archduke to attack with all haste and crush the French. The cautious Archduke at first refused and reaffirmed his express order to Beck to take no risks. Beck told him there was no risk on the open plain and the Spanish officers of the army told the archduke that he was giving up an opportunity to avenge the defeat of Rocroi. The Archduke then gave permission to start the battle, armed himself, confessed to his Jesuit priest and fled the field, leaving his army to its fate.

Condé and Gramont ordered the French main body to turn around and form up for battle. By 8 a.m. the armies were ready for action. The nimble and well-handled French guns fired while moving on the advancing Spanish who were easy targets on the forward slope, while the French infantry and cavalry marched forward to the sound of trumpets and the crash of drums. Condé frequently called a halt to the advance to keep the lines in order and maintain spacing to prevent the formations from bunching up. The Spanish artillery had trouble hitting the French. The Spanish were marching down the hill and arraying for combat simultaneously, which was a difficult task.

=== Cavalry struggle on the wings ===
At 8:30 Bucquoy's Walloon cavalry on the Spanish right, situated five paces behind the crest of a small hillock, were approached by Gramont's cavalry squadrons. At 20 paces, the Walloons discharged their carbines, killing or wounding almost everyone in the French first lines. The following ranks of the French cavalry nevertheless charged through the Walloons' formation, throwing it into disorder and rapidly causing a rout. The second echelon of Walloons then charged to help their comrades but a violent French cavalry charge sufficed to rout them. Only Gramont's Guards Squadron took heavy losses in this struggle with the second echelon.

Ligniville's Lorrainers advanced at a trot to meet the French right-wing cavalry under Condé, who were advancing at a walk. Both sides halted at pistol-shot, and neither side made a move for a time. Prior to the battle, Condé was impressed by the fire discipline of the German cavalry who never fired first and used their enemy's helplessness while reloading to charge and rout them. He therefore told his cavalry commanders to hold their fire as well to prevent the Germans from gaining an advantage. The Lorrainers eventually opened fire and killed, wounded or threw from their horse everyone in the French first lines. Condé gave the signal for his squadrons to open fire and then led the Gassion squadron on a charge, crushing the Lorrainer squadron opposite him. Six more French squadrons followed their General's lead and beat the rest of the Lorrainer line. The French cavalry reserve under Erlach came up and enveloped the exposed Lorrainer left, shattering them from the flank.

=== Battle in the center ===
Attacking at 9 a.m., the Spanish infantry in the center enjoyed strong success with its assault and broke 4 of the 12 French infantry battalions. Condé's order for his cavalry to hold their fire was taken as a point of honor by the musketeers who refused to fire first as well and before the enemy was at point-blank range. The French Guards fired first, while the Picardie and Erlach battalions were more patient. The French Guards and Scots Guard regiments were subsequently surrounded and the French Guards overwhelmed by the Bonifaz and Bentivoglio infantry battalions. This achievement meant little as both of the Spanish cavalry wings were fleeing from the field. The French center rallied around the Picardie regiment and the Spanish infantry was soon encircled and attacked from all sides by the French cavalry and infantry, much like at Rocroi. There was no replay of the Spanish last stand at Rocroi, the surrounded Spanish battalions choosing not to fight to the last extremity but to capitulate instead.

== Aftermath ==
Condé sent two cavalry regiments and an infantry regiment under Villequier to escort the 5,000–6,000 enemy prisoners to Arras and La Bassée, which required several round trips and caused the French to remain near the battlefield for the next eight days to await the return of the escorts. Once the prisoners were secure, Condé's army joined Josias von Rantzau's force in the siege of Furnes.

=== Casualties ===
3,000 of the Archduke's men lay dead or wounded and 5,000–6,000 were captured, along with all 38 guns, 100 flags, the pontoon bridges and the baggage train. Beck was captured and Condé lent him a carriage to take him to Arras, where he died of his wounds ten days later. The French lost 1,500–4,000 killed or wounded.

=== Political consequences ===
The year 1648 saw two political developments that were both directly tied to the Battle of Lens, but with opposite results. First, it caused a hardening of the monarchy's attitude toward the parlements, leading to an initial confrontation in Paris and a protracted struggle that followed. The French victory ended the Thirty Years' War, though not the conflict between France and Spain. The armies of Turenne, Wrangel and Königsmark were threatening Vienna and Prague; Emperor Ferdinand's ally, Maximilian of Bavaria, fervently wanted peace; and Philip IV had lost his main army. Ferdinand had no choice other than to make peace. He approved the propositions for peace from France and Sweden in Münster and Osnabrück. (Since 1641, talks had taken place between France and the Empire in Münster, and between Sweden and the Empire in Osnabrück.) The definitive peace treaty, called the Peace of Westphalia, was signed on 24 October, ending the Thirty Years' War. The war between France and Spain, in contrast, would not end until the Treaty of the Pyrenees on 7 November 1659). The latter made Lens and most of the Artois province part of France.

In the end, the French victory at Lens was made inconsequential by subsequent events elsewhere, during the failure to secure Anne of Austria's regency of France while Louis XIV was too young to rule. A civil war in France known as the Fronde broke out shortly afterwards, giving Spain the chance of recovery. The Te Deum at Notre-Dame de Paris in honour of the battle ended in a riot, which caused a serious confrontation that led to the revolt. In January 1649, Louis XIV and his ministers had to flee Paris.

== Forces ==
=== French order of battle ===
French Army at Lens, 20 August 1648
Wing	Strength	Echelon	Unit
Right Wing; Lieutenant General Louis II de Bourbon-Condé	3,400	1st	Conde Garde Squadron
Right Wing; Lieutenant General Louis II de Bourbon-Condé	3,400	1st	1st Orleans Garde Squadron
Right Wing; Lieutenant General Louis II de Bourbon-Condé	3,400	1st	2nd Orleans Garde Squadron
Right Wing; Lieutenant General Louis II de Bourbon-Condé	3,400	1st	La Melleraye Squadron
Right Wing; Lieutenant General Louis II de Bourbon-Condé	3,400	1st	St. Simon Squadron
Right Wing; Lieutenant General Louis II de Bourbon-Condé	3,400	1st	Bussy Squadron
Right Wing; Lieutenant General Louis II de Bourbon-Condé	3,400	1st	Streif (German) Squadron
Right Wing; Lieutenant General Louis II de Bourbon-Condé	3,400	1st	Harcourt Squadron
Right Wing; Lieutenant General Louis II de Bourbon-Condé	3,400	1st	Beaujeu Squadron
Right Wing; Lieutenant General Louis II de Bourbon-Condé	3,400	2nd	1st Chappes Squadron
Right Wing; Lieutenant General Louis II de Bourbon-Condé	3,400	2nd	2nd Chappes Squadron
Right Wing; Lieutenant General Louis II de Bourbon-Condé	3,400	2nd	Ravenel Squadron
Right Wing; Lieutenant General Louis II de Bourbon-Condé	3,400	2nd	Coudray Squadron
Right Wing; Lieutenant General Louis II de Bourbon-Condé	3,400	2nd	Salbrick Squadron
Right Wing; Lieutenant General Louis II de Bourbon-Condé	3,400	2nd	Vidame Squadron
Right Wing; Lieutenant General Louis II de Bourbon-Condé	3,400	2nd	1st Villiette Squadron
Right Wing; Lieutenant General Louis II de Bourbon-Condé	3,400	2nd	2nd Villiette Squadron
Center; Marshal Gaspard IV de Coligny-Châtillon	8,200	1st	Picardie-Orleans Regiment
Center; Marshal Gaspard IV de Coligny-Châtillon	8,200	1st	Erlach (German)-Perrault Regiment
Center; Marshal Gaspard IV de Coligny-Châtillon	8,200	1st	Scottish Regiment
Center; Marshal Gaspard IV de Coligny-Châtillon	8,200	1st	1st French Guards Regiment
Center; Marshal Gaspard IV de Coligny-Châtillon	8,200	1st	2nd French Guards Regiment
Center; Marshal Gaspard IV de Coligny-Châtillon	8,200	1st	Swiss Guards Regiment
Center; Marshal Gaspard IV de Coligny-Châtillon	8,200	1st	Persan Regiment
Center; Marshal Gaspard IV de Coligny-Châtillon	8,200	1st	6 cavalry squadrons
Center; Marshal Gaspard IV de Coligny-Châtillon	8,200	2nd	La Reine Regiment
Center; Marshal Gaspard IV de Coligny-Châtillon	8,200	2nd	Erlach (French)-Razilly Regiment
Center; Marshal Gaspard IV de Coligny-Châtillon	8,200	2nd	Mazarin (Italian) Regiment
Center; Marshal Gaspard IV de Coligny-Châtillon	8,200	2nd	Conti Regiment
Center; Marshal Gaspard IV de Coligny-Châtillon	8,200	2nd	Conde Regiment
Left Wing; Marshal Antoine III de Gramont	3,200	1st Marshal Antoine III de Gramont	Gramont-La Ferte Gardes Squadron
Left Wing; Marshal Antoine III de Gramont	3,200	1st Marshal Antoine III de Gramont	Carabins Squadron
Left Wing; Marshal Antoine III de Gramont	3,200	1st Marshal Antoine III de Gramont	Mazarin Squadron
Left Wing; Marshal Antoine III de Gramont	3,200	1st Marshal Antoine III de Gramont	1st Gramont Squadron
Left Wing; Marshal Antoine III de Gramont	3,200	1st Marshal Antoine III de Gramont	2nd Gramont Squadron
Left Wing; Marshal Antoine III de Gramont	3,200	1st Marshal Antoine III de Gramont	1st La Ferte Squadron
Left Wing; Marshal Antoine III de Gramont	3,200	1st Marshal Antoine III de Gramont	2nd La Ferte Squadron
Left Wing; Marshal Antoine III de Gramont	3,200	1st Marshal Antoine III de Gramont	1st Beins Squadron
Left Wing; Marshal Antoine III de Gramont	3,200	1st Marshal Antoine III de Gramont	2nd Beins Squadron
Left Wing; Marshal Antoine III de Gramont	3,200	2nd Lieutenant General Henri de La Ferté-Senneterre	Roquelaure Squadron
Left Wing; Marshal Antoine III de Gramont	3,200	2nd Lieutenant General Henri de La Ferté-Senneterre	Gesvre Squadron
Left Wing; Marshal Antoine III de Gramont	3,200	2nd Lieutenant General Henri de La Ferté-Senneterre	Lillebonne Squadron
Left Wing; Marshal Antoine III de Gramont	3,200	2nd Lieutenant General Henri de La Ferté-Senneterre	1st Noitlieu Squadron
Left Wing; Marshal Antoine III de Gramont	3,200	2nd Lieutenant General Henri de La Ferté-Senneterre	2nd Noitlieu Squadron
Left Wing; Marshal Antoine III de Gramont	3,200	2nd Lieutenant General Henri de La Ferté-Senneterre	Meille Squadron
Left Wing; Marshal Antoine III de Gramont	3,200	2nd Lieutenant General Henri de La Ferté-Senneterre	Chemerault Squadron
Reserve; Lieutenant General Johann Ludwig von Erlach	1,200	3rd	1st Erlach Squadron
Reserve; Lieutenant General Johann Ludwig von Erlach	1,200	3rd	2nd Erlach Squadron
Reserve; Lieutenant General Johann Ludwig von Erlach	1,200	3rd	1st Ruvigny Squadron
Reserve; Lieutenant General Johann Ludwig von Erlach	1,200	3rd	2nd Ruvigny Squadron
Reserve; Lieutenant General Johann Ludwig von Erlach	1,200	3rd	1st Sirot Squadron
Reserve; Lieutenant General Johann Ludwig von Erlach	1,200	3rd	2nd Sirot Squadron
Artillery; Comte de Cossé	18 guns		
Army Total	16,000: 7,000 infantry, 9,000 cavalry, 18 guns		

=== Spanish order of battle ===
Spanish Army at Lens, 20 August 1648
Wing	Strength	Echelon	Unit
Right Wing; Bucquoy	4,000	1st and 2nd	27 Walloon Squadrons
Center; Major General Jean de Beck	11,000	1st	3 Lorrainer Regiments
Center; Major General Jean de Beck	11,000	1st	2 Walloon Regiments
Center; Major General Jean de Beck	11,000	1st	2 Irish Regiments
Center; Major General Jean de Beck	11,000	1st	German Regiment
Center; Major General Jean de Beck	11,000	1st	Italian Regiment
Center; Major General Jean de Beck	11,000	1st	New Spanish Regiment
Center; Major General Jean de Beck	11,000	1st	13 Squadrons
Center; Major General Jean de Beck	11,000	2nd	3 Old Spanish Regiments
Center; Major General Jean de Beck	11,000	2nd	3 Mixed Regiments
Left Wing; Ligniville	3,000	1st and 2nd	20 Lorrainer Squadrons
Army Total	18,000: 9,000 infantry, 9,000 cavalry, 38 guns		
