= Grand Falconer of France =

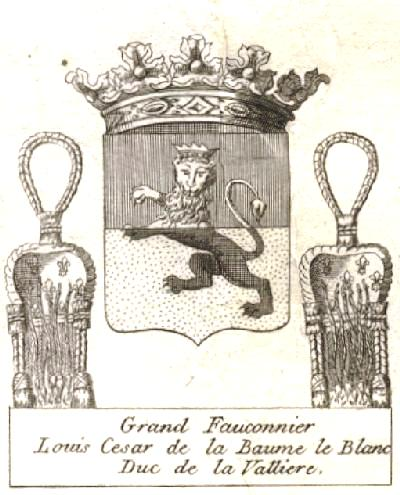
Coat of arms of Louis César de La Baume Le Blanc (appointed as Grand Falconer in 1748)

Heraldic ornaments of a Grand Falconer, which can be seen in the coat of arms above

The Grand Falconer of France (French: Grand Fauconnier de France) was a position in the King's Household in France from the Middle Ages to the French Revolution.

== History ==
The position first appeared in 1250 as "Master Falconer of the King" (Maître Fauconnier). The title was changed to Grand Falconer in 1406, although the title of "First Falconer" (Premier Fauconnier) was sometimes also used. The Grand Falconer was responsible for organizing the royal falcon hunt and for caring for the king's hunting birds. The position was one of the "Great Offices of the Maison du Roi".

From the reign of Louis XIV, the position became purely honorific, as the kings had stopped hunting with birds of prey. This notwithstanding, Louis XIV maintained an aviary of hunting birds, located (from 1680 on) in Montainville, as a symbol of power. Falcons were presented to the king at the start of each year in the Galerie des Glaces of the château of Versailles, generally in the presence of foreign ambassadors. Only northern kings and the Grand Falconer had the right to pose a falcon on the hand of the king.

The coat of arms of the Grand Falconer featured two lures in blue and fleur-de-lys, placed below and to each side of the shield.

== Grand Falconers ==
- c.1250: Jean de Beaune (until 1406 the title was Master Falconer of the King)
- c.1274: Étienne Granché
- dates?: Simon de Champdivers
- c.1313: Pierre de Montguignard
- c.1325: Pierre de Neuvy
- c.1317: Jean Candavenes
- c.1338: Philippe Danvin
- c.1351: Jean de Serens
- c.1354: Jean de Pisseleu
- c.1367: Eustache de Chisy
- c.1371: Nicolas Thomas
- c.1372: André d'Humières
- 1381: Enguerrand Dargies
- 1385: Enguerrand de Laigny
- 1394: Jean de Sorvilliers
- 1406: Eustache de Gaucourt "Rassin" (†c.1415) (henceforth, the title was Grand Falconer of the King, except where indicated)
- 1415: Jean V Malet de Granville et de Montagu († after 1441)
- 1416: Nicolas de Bruneval
- 1418: Guillaume Després
- 1428: Jean de Lubin (First Falconer of the King)
- 1429: Philippe de La Châtre
- c.1441: Arnoulet de Caves (First Falconer of the King)
- 1455: Georges de La Châtre
- 1468: Olivier Salart, seigneur de Bonnel
- c.1480: Jacques Odart, seigneur de Cursay
- c.1514: Raoul Vernon, seigneur de Montreuil-Bonin
- c.1521: René de Cossé, seigneur de Brissac (also Grand Panetier)
- c.1549: Louis Prévost de Sansac (First Falconer of the King)
- c.1550: Charles I de Cossé, comte de Brissac (also Grand Panetier, Marshal and Grand Master of the Artillery)
- c.1563: Timoléon de Cossé, comte de Brissac (also Grand Panetier)
- 1569: Charles II de Cossé, comte and then duc de Brissac (also Grand Panetier and Marshal)
- 1596: Robert de La Vieuville, baron de Rugles et d'Arzillières
- 1610: Charles de La Vieuville
- 1612: André de Vivonne, seigneur de la Béraudière
- 1616?: Nicolas de La Rochefoucauld
- 1616: Charles d'Albert (1578–1621), duc de Luynes (also Constable of France)
- 1622: Claude de Lorraine (1578–1657), prince de Joinville, duc de Chevreuse (also Grand Chambellain)
- 1643: Louis Charles d'Albert de Luynes (1620–1699), duc de Luynes, duc de Chevreuse
- 1650: Nicolas Dauvet, baron de Boursault
- 1672: Henry François Dauvet, marquis de Saint-Phalle († 1688)
- 1688: François Dauvet, baron de Boursault († 1718)
- 1717: François Louis Dauvet, baron de Boursault
- 1748: Louis César de La Baume Le Blanc, duc de La Vallière (1708–1780)
- 1762: Louis Gaucher de Châtillon (1737–1762)
- 1780: Joseph Hyacinthe François de Paule de Rigaud, Comte de Vaudreuil (1740–1817)

== See also ==
- Great Officers of the Crown of France
- Maison du Roi
- Protoierakarios
