= Pitel =

Pitel is a surname. Notable people with the surname include:

- Edwige Pitel (born 1967), French cyclist
- Françoise Pitel (1662–1721), French actress
- Serhiy Pitel (born 1995), Ukrainian football player
