= Mademoiselle de Blois =

Mademoiselle de Blois may refer to one of the following:

- Marie Anne de Bourbon (1666–1739) illegitimate daughter of Louis XIV of France and Louise de La Vallière
- Françoise Marie de Bourbon (1677–1749) illegitimate daughter of Louis XIV of France and Madame de Montespan
