= Robert de La Vieuville =

French general and governor (died 1612)

- marquis de Sy
- Coat of arms of Robert de La Vieuville
- Died: c. 1612
- Noble family: La Vieuville
- Issue: Charles de La Vieuville
- Father: Pierre de La Vieuville

Robert de La Vieuville, marquis de Sy (–1612) was a French governor and military commander in Champagne and the Rethélois during the French Wars of Religion. The son of Pierre de La Vieuville, the marquis followed his father into the service of the new duc de Nevers (duke of Nevers), receiving the office of governor of the key border city of Mézières in 1569. Over the following decades he would be a consistent client of the Nevers family, while also acting as a firm royalist in Champagne. To this end he became a gentilhomme de la chambre for the king of Navarre in 1573. The following year, Nevers saw him established as lieutenant-general of the Rethélois, of which Nevers was duc. He acquired lands from his patron by acting as their creditor, most notably in 1576. In 1577 he was granted a compagnie d'ordonnance (ordinance company) and he was later to be inducted as a conseiller d'État (councillor of state) in 1580. Over his career he would become a chevalier (knight) of both the most senior orders of French chivalry, Saint Michel in 1580 and Saint-Esprit in 1599.

In 1584 the Duc de Guise established a Catholic Ligue (League) to oppose the succession of the Protestant king of Navarre to the throne. This ligue entered war with the crown in 1585 and in furtherance of elevating his position in Champagne (a province of which he was also governor), Guise sought to oust La Vieuville from Mézières, on the grounds that La Vieuville was too royalist. To appease Nevers, Guise selected an intimate of his the comte de Grandpré to replace La Vieuville, establishing him in the city. However, in negotiations for peace with the crown in July, Catherine, negotiating for her son the king, refused to concede the governorship of Mézières to Grandpré and thus La Vieuville was left in charge. In 1586 Nevers himself spoke in favour of transferring the governate, and La Vieuville was temporarily dispossessed, though he would be back in the office by 1587. As relations with the ligue again collapsed in 1588, the king decided to assassinate the duc de Guise in December 1588. This destroyed royal authority in Champagne, with the majority of cities defecting to the ligue. La Vieuville tried to preserve Mézières for the crown, but was arrested by the citizens of the city in April, though released shortly thereafter. Over the following years La Vieuville fought for the royalist cause but was unable to recapture Mézières, which only defected to the royalist cause in 1595. In 1597 he fought alongside the young new duc de Nevers and orchestrated the French recapture of Reims. In 1607 the lieutenant-general of Champagne died, and the charge was broken into four, with La Vieuville made lieutenant-general of Reims, Rocroi, Sainte-Menehould, Villefranche, Maubert-Fontaine and Mézières. He died in 1612 and was succeeded to his charges by his son Charles de La Vieuville.

== Early life and family ==
Robert de La Vieuville was the son of Pierre de La Vieuville. Pierre served at first the Clèves ducs de Nevers (dukes of Nevers) before transferring his service to the Gonzague ducs upon the extinction of the Clèves line. Pierre became a gentilhomme de la chambre du roi (gentleman of the king's chamber) for Charles IX in 1566. At the end of his life around 1573, Pierre de La Vieuville served as the garrison commander of Reims.

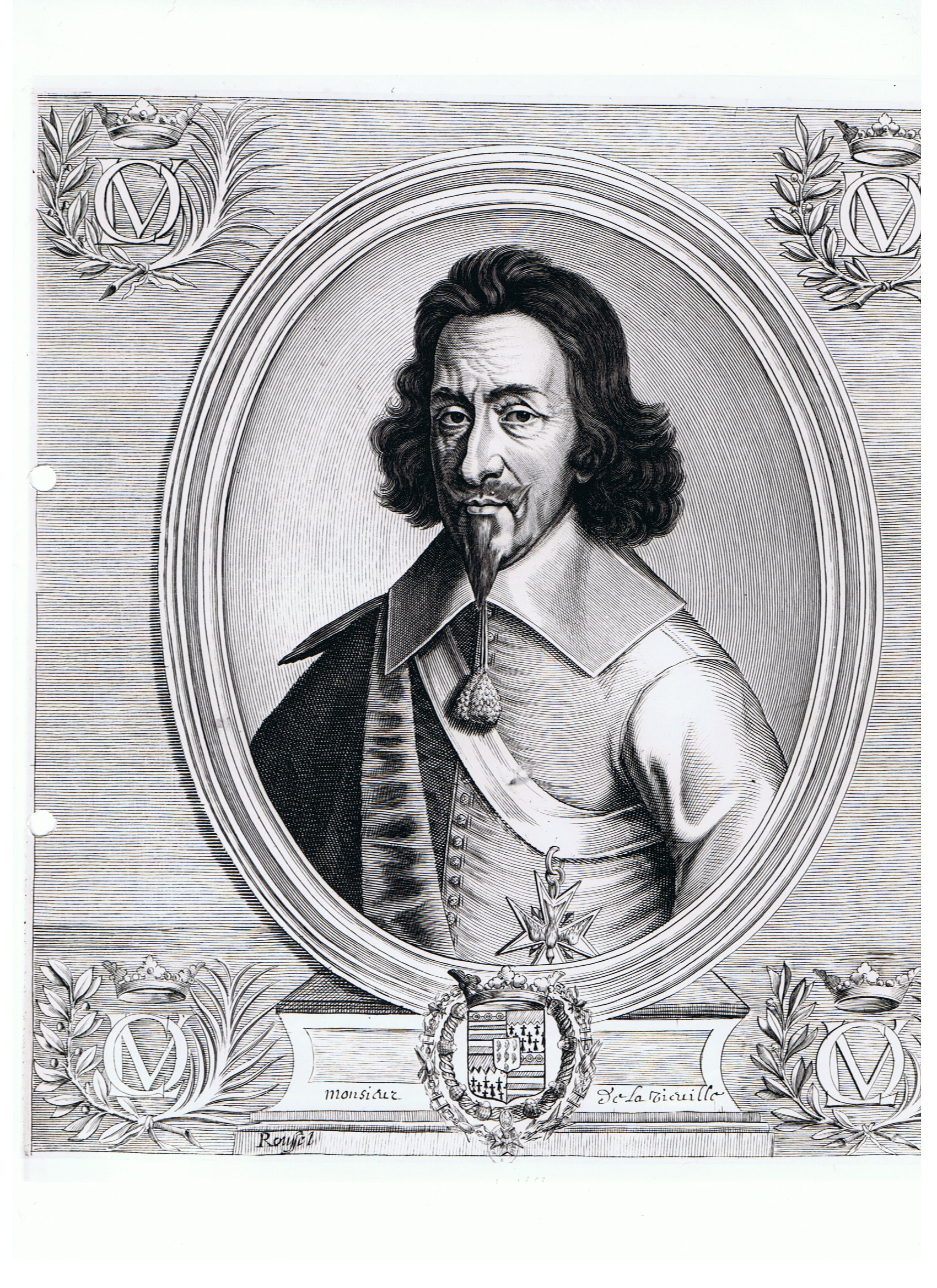
Charles de La Vieuville, son of Robert who would serve as surintendant des finances (superintendent of the finances) under Louis XIII and Louis XIV

For his son Charles de La Vieuville, Robert arranged a marriage with Marie Bouhier, daughter of Vincent Bouhier, the treasurer of l'Épargne, some time shortly before his death. This brought the family into close proximity with the world of Parisian high finance.

== Reign of Charles IX ==
=== Catholic partisan ===
The garrisoning system of Champagne, which had in the reigns of François I and Henri II been put towards territorial defence against external attacks was diverted to new purposes in the religious civil wars of the latter part of the century. La Vieuville informed the king on 8 September 1568, that soldiers under his command had been despatched to Vézelay so that they might support the lieutenant-general of Champagne the seigneur de Barbezieux in attacks against the Protestants of the region.

=== Governor of Mézières ===
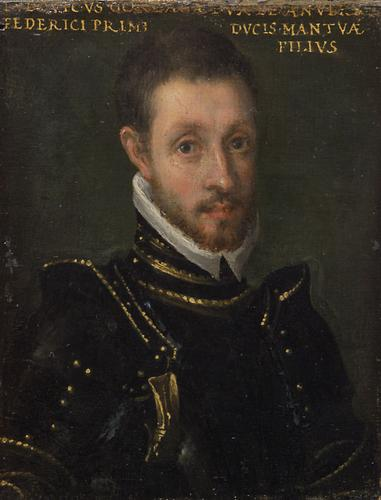
Duc de Nevers and Rethel who would serve as patron to La Vieuville for much of his career

It was through the patronage of the great lord the duc de Nevers that first Pierre and then his son Robert de La Vieuville were established as the governors of Mézières. La Vieuville thus assumed this charge in November 1569. Mézières occupied a position almost on the French border, giving the possession of its governance an immense strategic value.

Relations between La Vieuville and the citizens of his new charge had already been soured by the actions of his father during his time of authority over Mézières from 1564 to 1569. Pierre de La Vieuville had reconfigured the towns constitution to have the échevins elected by the militia officers. He further introduced a garrison to the town during the second civil war. As such, there was considerable opposition in Mézières to both him, and by extension his son. The city looked for a suitable noble counterweight to the power of the Nevers in Mézières.

Alongside his service to the ducs de Nevers, La Vieuville became a gentilhomme de la chambre du roi for the king of Navarre in February 1573.

In January 1574 La Vieuville received a further elevation from the duc de Nevers, being established as the lieutenant-general of the Rethélois (the duc de Nevers also being the duc de Rethel). This office was requested of the king for La Vieuville by Nevers.

== Reign of Henri III ==
=== Fifth war of religion ===
A truce was established during the fifth war of religion in November 1575 between the crown and the Protestant and Catholic rebels. This was known as the Truce of Champigny. As a component of the truce, Mézières was provided to the Protestant prince Condé. This only furthered the resentment felt in Mézières that had been developed against their governor, and inclined them more towards Guise and (eventually) the Catholic ligue (league). In the event, Condé would never receive Mézières as the truce was violated before his control could be established, with the civil war resuming.

As a client of Nevers, La Vieuville acted as a creditor to the duc. On 4 August 1576, the duc de Nevers and his wife Henriette de Clèves sold to La Vieuville the seigneuries of Lumes, Vatraincourt, Romery and Monion for 23,000 livres. La Vieuville provided 12,000 livres of the sum in cash, and on the same day loaned the duc 800 écus. While the duc and duchesse hoped to repurchase the seigneuries in sunnier days, this would not prove possible, and in 1596 Henriette would renounce her right to redeem the territories. It would not be until 1615 that the next duc de Nevers would repurchase the majority of the lands from La Vieuville's son, for 60,000 livres (though the La Vieuville would retain two of the territories).

=== Royal favour ===
In 1577 La Vieuville received command of his own compagnie d'ordonnance (ordinance company). This put around 50 men-at-arms under his authority.

La Vieuville received the charge of being made a conseiller d'État (councillor of state) in April 1580. At this time he was also inducted as a chevalier (knight) of the Ordre de Saint-Michel (Order of Saint-Michel) the second most senior order of French chivalry.

=== Crisis of the Catholic Ligue ===
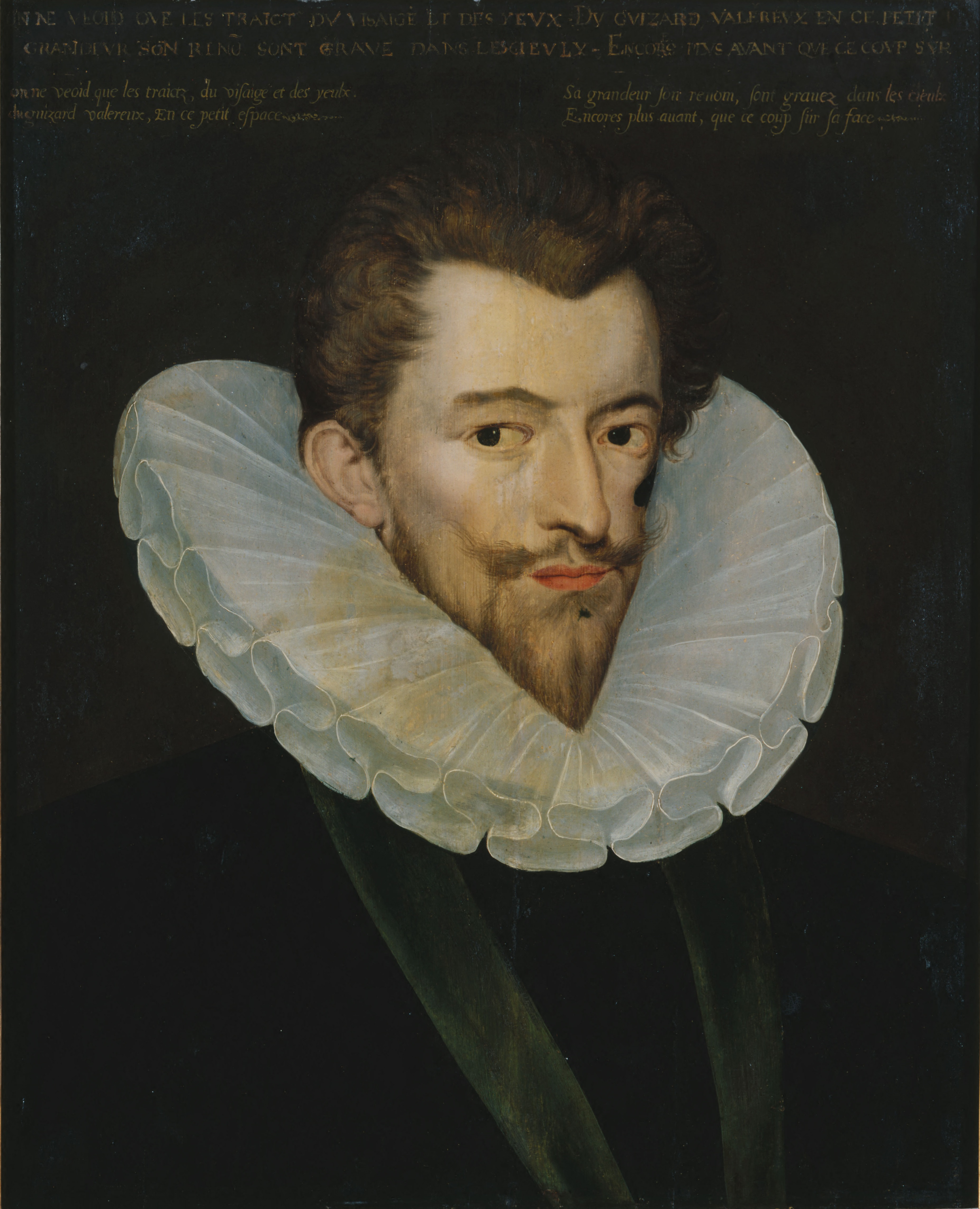
Duc de Guise leader of the Catholic Ligue and governor of Champagne, who would try to remove La Vieuville from his office

During the Catholic ligue crisis brought about by the death of the king's brother Alençon and subsequent establishment of the Protestant king of Navarre as heir to the throne, the ligueur (leaguer) leader the duc de Guise manoeuvred for advantage in his governate of Champagne. As part of this he took up the cause of the people of Mézières, who asked to be relieved of La Vieuville as their governor and have him expelled from their city. Guise, conscious that he could not disposes La Vieuville without upsetting Nevers, selected the comte de Grandpré, a close intimate of the duc as the candidate to replace them. This appeased any potential objection Nevers could have to the effort, and thus the path was open for Guise to increase his credit in Champagne and be free of a man who was associated far too greatly with the royalist cause.

in the years 1585 to 1589, La Vieuville would on two occasions extract promises from Mézières to obey him. Meanwhile, he promised the council that he would maintain their urban liberties. The very existence of these promises speaks to a lack of trust between La Vieuville and the people/council of Mézières.

=== War with the Catholic Ligue ===
La Vieuville was at this very moment in 1585 working to oppose Guise's rebellion and maintain Mézières in loyalty to the crown. On 25 March he wrote to the city council ordering them not to admit any soldiers into the city before his arrival. In April Guise arrived and installed Grandpré in the city over the objection of the king and Nevers, who both wrote to the council demanding they re-admit La Vieuville. Guise simultaneously wrote letters to the council ordering them to ignore the royal orders, telling them to follow the example of Verdun which had just submitted to him.

In negotiations with the crown in July to secure Grandpré's appointment officially, conducted as part of the broader attempts to forge a treaty between the rebel ligue and the crown, Guise was firm on the necessity of La Vieuville's removal. Catherine de Medici, negotiating for the crown was however unwilling to concede on this point, and for the moment La Vieuville was left in his charge formally. Both Grandpré and La Vieuville were thus left in limbo by the Treaty of Nemours which brought the war between the ligue and the crown to a close. The treaty effectively outlawed Protestantism in France, while the Lorraine princes were granted surety towns to ensure the terms were abided by. Guise received Châlons, Saint-Dizier, Toul, Verdun and Mézières.

=== Loyalist ===
Nevers himself, when he was back in royal favour in 1586 would intercede with the king in favour of Grandpré's appointment. La Vieuville who was seen as too royalist by the inhabitants of Mézières had struggled to command their obedience, and with Grandpré (who enjoyed friendly relations in the city) in charge, Nevers felt Mézières was better preserved under both the king's and his own authority. Nevers was not however happy with the role of Guise in the whole affair, seeing him as having encouraged the disorder and disobedience of the bourgeois of Mézèieres against his authority. In October 1586 Henri, convinced of Grandpré's loyalty assented to him replacing La Vieuville.

By 1587 Nevers had secured the reappointment of La Vieuville as governor of Mézières. Guise had been convinced to back down in his opposition to La Vieuville by Cardinal Bourbon who assured him that La Vieuville was his man.

In Champagne during these years, there was a great conflict for the loyalty and support of the secondary nobility between Guise, the provinces governor and Dinteville who was technically subordinate to Guise as the provinces lieutenant-general, but who acted independently as the head of the royalist faction. La Vieuville was among those nobles who was not part of Guise's network in the province and therefore did not involve himself in Guise's campaign against the provinces Protestant population. It was only in October 1587 when an army of Protestant reiters under the graf von Donha (count of Donha) invaded France through Champagne that La Vieuville's compagnie d'ordonnance was summoned to join Guise's forces.

Guise successfully bested the German army at Vimory and Auneau in late 1587. Shortly after these victories, the Protestant duc de Bouillon and sovereign prince de Sedan died in January 1588. La Vieuville was charged with protecting the lands, now held by Bouillon's sister Charlotte de La Marck from any aggressions by Guise. Henri compelled Guise to promise to not invade Sedan, which he would abide by. Instead it would be the duc de Lorraine and baron de Rosne who invaded the principality. La Vieuville was caught in a bind, in the conflict between his responsibilities to La Marck and those to his governate of Mézières. The prime military threat to his governate came from the land he was now charged with protecting.

=== Estates General of 1588 ===
In May the Catholic ligue effected a coup, seizing Paris and chasing the king from the capital. To regain the city, Henri made many concessions to the ligue, among them agreeing to convene an Estates General. La Vieuville travelled to Blois for the conduct of the Estates General of 1588, having been summoned to participate by the king. Leaving Mézières, La Vieuville had the inhabitants promise they would not admit an alternate governor during his absence.

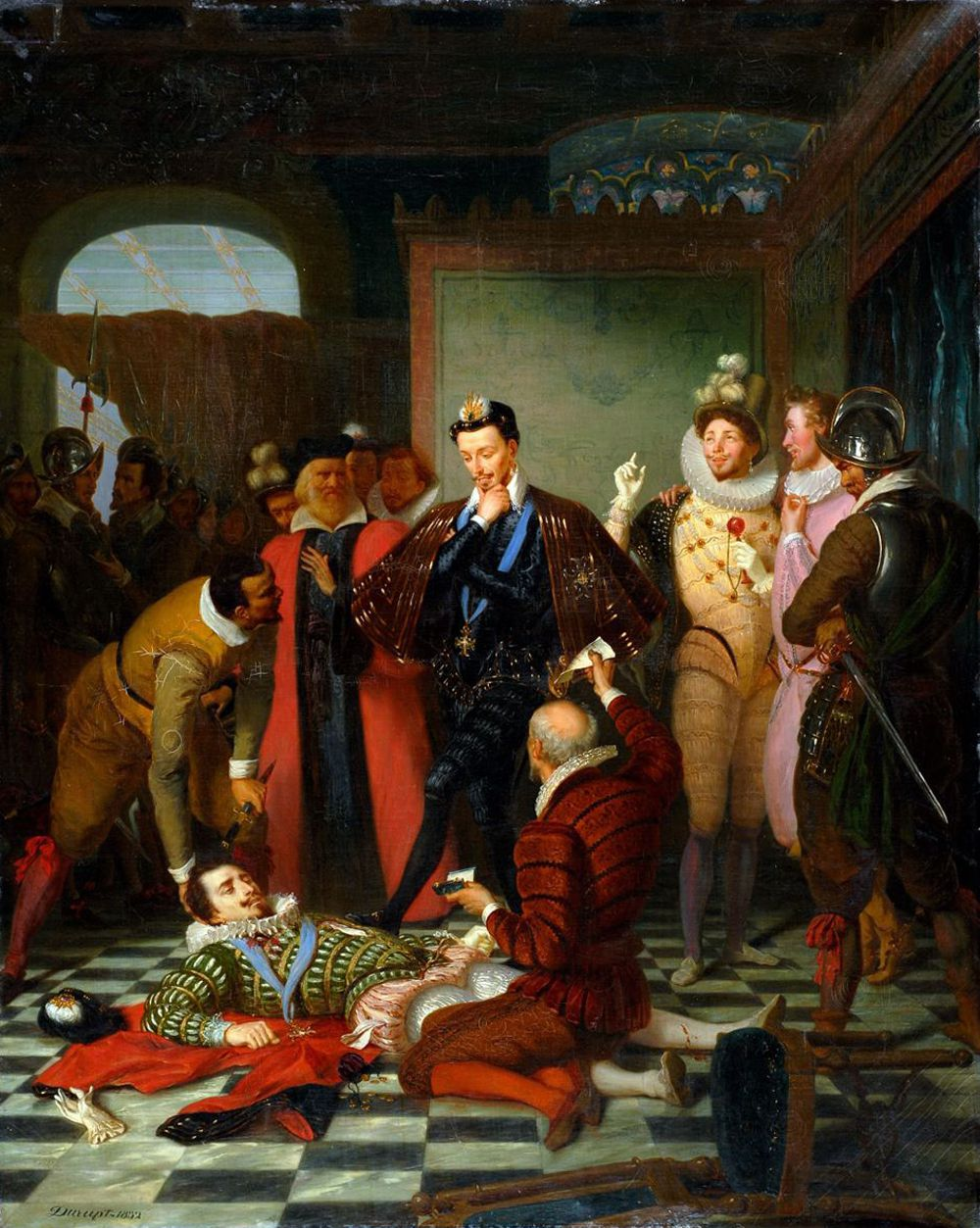
Assassination of the Duc de Guise by Henri III, which would precipitate a new war between the crown and the Catholic Ligue, causing much of Champagne to defect from the crown

The assassination of the duc de Guise during the Estates General in December 1588 created a situation in which the royalist and ligueur parties competed for the allegiance of the provincial authorities. La Vieuville in his position as lieutenant-general of the Rethelois held it loyally for the king. He liaised with the governors of Rocroi and Maubert-Fontaine in north Champagne and they jointly formed an oath to remain loyal to the crown and to support each other.

=== Second Civil War with the Ligue ===
In Mézières, La Vieuville worked to buttress his position, bringing some garrisons to bear on the town and removing them once he had extracted a renewal of the promise the council had made to him and oaths of obedience to Nevers and Henriette. He promised that he would listen to whatever path the city wished to forge. He assured the council that he would die a Catholic, and reminded them that his lord, Nevers had always been a firm Catholic. This proved sufficient for the council on a temporary basis, with a decision to wait until word from Nevers had arrived in March before declaring their allegiance. This was however somewhat two faced, as the council was already in communication with the ligueur Sainte-Union (Holy Union) council of Reims, a fact La Vieuville understood. Things did not proceed well for La Vieuville, with the ligueur agents working on the population of Mézières, and himself short on personal means to resist. Across Champagne, the ligue won most towns and cities to their cause. La Vieuville wrote to Nevers, assuring him that he would have the Rethélois and Mézières in obedience to both him and the king. He stated that he would die loyal to Nevers and Henriette. An order arrived to garrison royal soldiers in the city, justified as a means to protect Mézières from Protestant held Sedan. The council assented to their entry on the condition the truce with the Protestants be overturned, however to the ligueur partisans on the streets the garrison was proof they were all about to be forced to become Protestants. On 27 March the council swore itself to the ligue, despite the fact its deadline to Nevers for him to provide his instructions had not yet expired. La Vieuville was powerless to stop the city affiliating with the Sainte-Union. Two deputies were despatched to Reims to further the establishment of the union, returning on 9 April. Those who would not make an oath to the ligue were to be arrested, and a ligueur army was to arrive under the authority of the sieur de Geoffroiville. It was agreed in the council that La Vieuville would be imprisoned upon Geoffroiville's arrival.

When Geoffroiville arrived in front of Mézières, La Vieuville hurried to the gates, threatening to kill anyone who stopped him closing them on Geoffroiville. Instead La Vieuville was arrested and possibly due to be executed by the inhabitants, however Geoffroiville dissuaded them.

The ligueur appointed lieutenant-general of Champagne, Saint-Paul hurried to Mézières to ensure its loyalty to the ligue, arriving on 22 April. Saint-Paul took it upon himself through April and May to demand a high ransom for La Vieuville, despite the governor not even being his captive. Meanwhile, his château de Sy was besieged by Saint-Paul. Saint-Paul had the walls bombarded with cannons. Ultimately Saint-Paul released La Vieuville on condition he did not bear arms against the ligue, La Vieuville would ignore this promise.

== Reign of Henri IV ==
=== Nevers retreat to neutrality ===
In the wake of the assassination of Henri III, the Protestant king of Navarre succeeded him as Henri IV. This created difficulty for some of the royalist Catholics, who were not comfortable with serving a Protestant king. Among these was the duc de Nevers. He received appeals to fully join the ligueur camp from the duchesse de Guise, meanwhile the more royalist inclined La Vieuville provided him a long report in August, detailing the critical situation in which the kingdom found itself and the need to demonstrate his good character. The ligueur party was, according to La Vieuville led by the ambitious house of Lorraine, who wished to use their candidate for king Cardinal Bourbon as a puppet while the duc de Mayenne would rule like a king. Nevers would surprise La Vieuville by deciding against affiliating with either the royalist or ligueur cause.

=== Attempt on Mézières ===
In 1591 La Vieuville launched an assault on ligueur held Mézières in conjunction with the new duc de Bouillon. The attack was launched on 29 June, but failed to breach the citadel, gaining only temporary possession of a single tower before withdrawing. The city celebrated their victory with a thanksgiving procession. Indeed, Mézières would remain loyal to the ligue longer than Paris did and would be the last city in Champagne to return to the royalist fold, defecting to the royalist cause some time in May 1595.

=== War with España ===
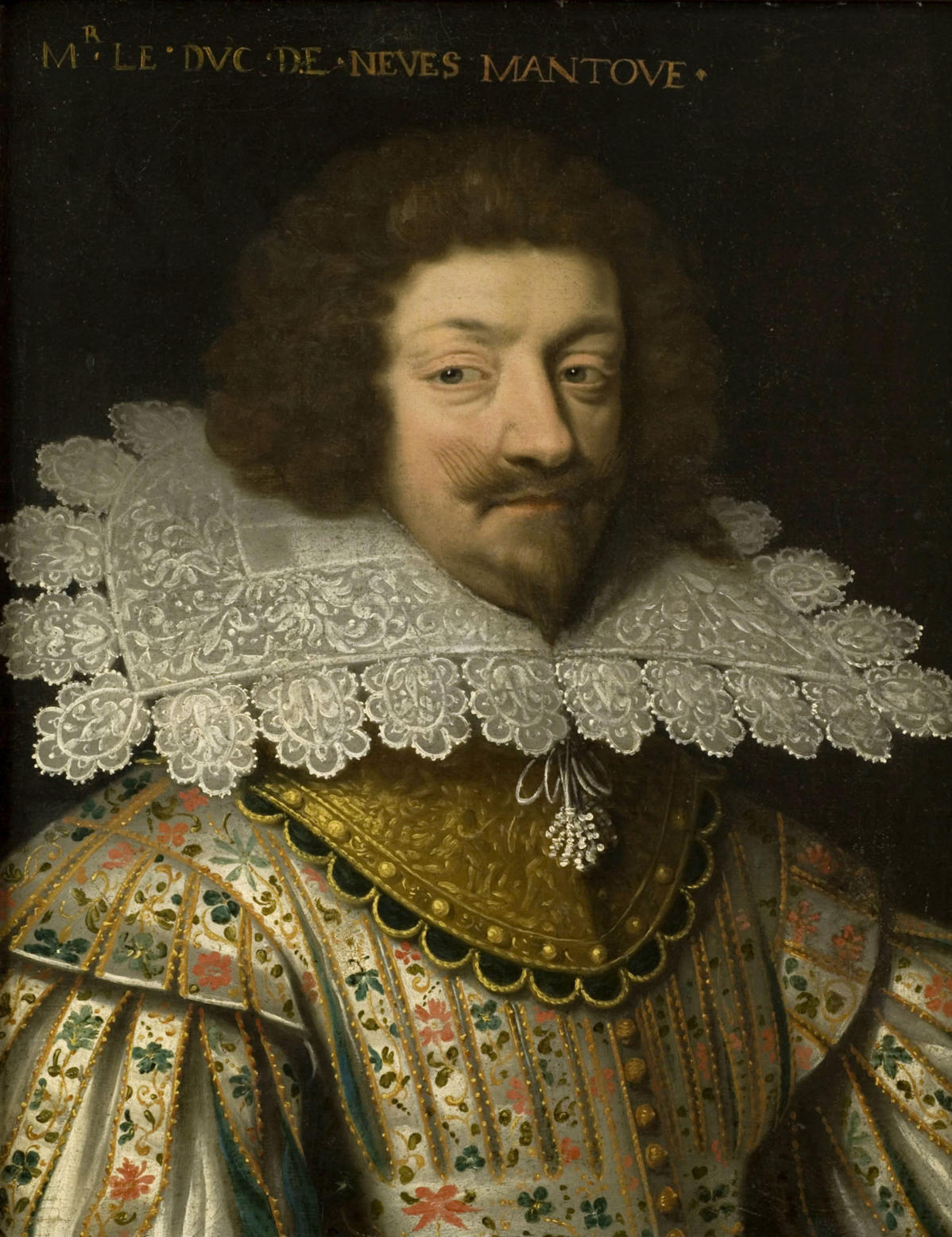
Son of the first Gonzague duc de Nevers who succeeded him

In 1597, during the campaign against the Spanish, La Vieuville took to the field in Champagne alongside the young new duc of Nevers. La Vieuville, in the service of the king, acted as the young ducs escort in these military operations. He wrote back to the elder duchesse de Nevers, Henriette, telling her of her sons performance and the ways in which he was serving the family. In March of that year, La Vieuville orchestrated the royalist capture of Reims, supported by Nevers. In writing to Henriette, La Vieuville explained that it was important to royal authority to re-establish control of this city, but that it was also important for the respectability of the Nevers name in Champagne. Just a little while before the seizure, the Spanish had seized Amiens, therefore this victory softened the morale blow.

La Vieuville, able to maintain himself in consistent royal favour, was rewarded in 1599 by being made a chevalier of the Ordre du Saint-Esprit (Order of Saint-Esprit). This promotion was extraordinary for a noble who had been of only local importance 30 years previous.

His position with the Gonzague-Nevers family meant that, when a matter of dispute rose over their inheritance in 1605, he was tasked with intervening to resolve it by king Henri.

=== Lieutenant-General in Champagne ===
Upon the death of lieutenant-general Dinteville in October 1607, Henri divided his lieutenant-general responsibilities among four men. To the marquis de Praslin went Troyes, Sens, Langres, Châlons and Épernay; to the marquis de Vitry the subsidiary governate of Brie; to the marquis d'Andelot Chaumont, Vitry-le-François and Saint-Dizier; finally to La Vieuville went Reims, Rocroi, Sainte-Menehould, Villefranche, Maubert-Fontaine and Mézières. This was not an attempt by Henri to dilute the power of the secondary nobility in Champagne, which had shown itself vital during the religious wars, but rather to focus the responsibilities so it could be more effective.

== Reign of Louis XIII ==
La Vieuville died in 1612 and was succeeded by his son Charles de La Vieuville who had already assumed his lieutenant-generalcy in Champagne back in 1611. Charles entered politics in Paris, and during his career would have conflict with Cardinal Richelieu.

== Sources ==
- Boltanski, Ariane (2006). Les ducs de Nevers et l'État royal: genèse d'un compromis (ca 1550 - ca 1600). Librairie Droz.
- Bourquin, Laurent (1994). Noblesse Seconde et Pouvoir en Champagne aux XVIe et XVIIe Siècles. Éditions de la Sorbonne.
- Konnert, Mark (2006). Local Politics in the French Wars of Religion: The Towns of Champagne, the Duc de Guise and the Catholic League 1560-1595. Ashgate.
- Le Roux, Nicolas (2006). Un Régicide au nom de Dieu: L'Assassinat d'Henri III. Gallimard.
