= Louis César de La Baume Le Blanc =

French nobleman, bibliophile and military man

- Duke of La Vallière
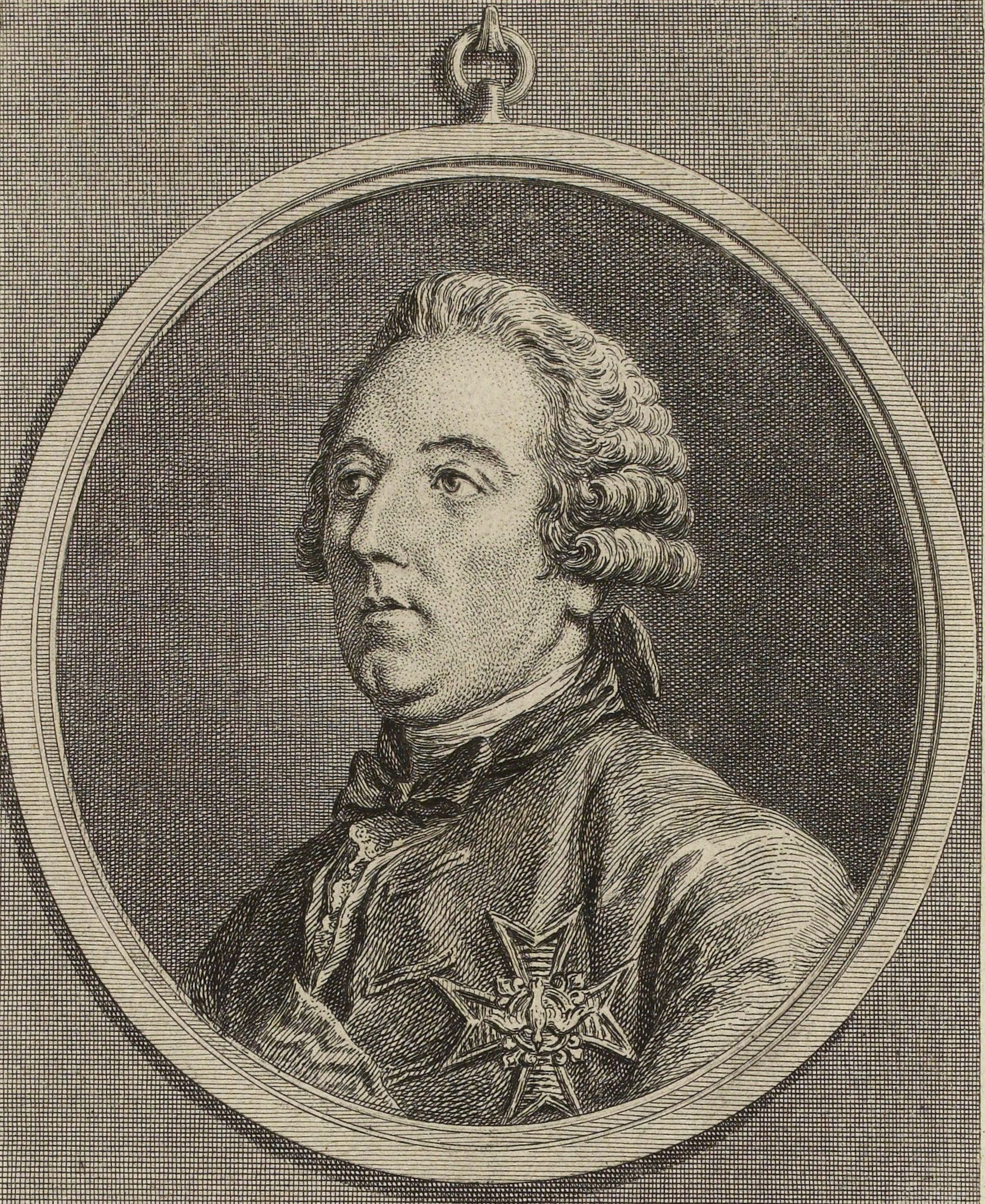
- Full name: Louis César de La Baume Le Blanc
- Born: 9 October 1708
- Died: 16 November 1780 (aged 72)
- Spouse: Jeanne Julie Françoise de Crussol d'Uzès
- Issue Detail: Adrienne, Duchess of La Vallière
- Father: Charles François de La Baume Le Blanc
- Mother: Marie Thérèse de Noailles

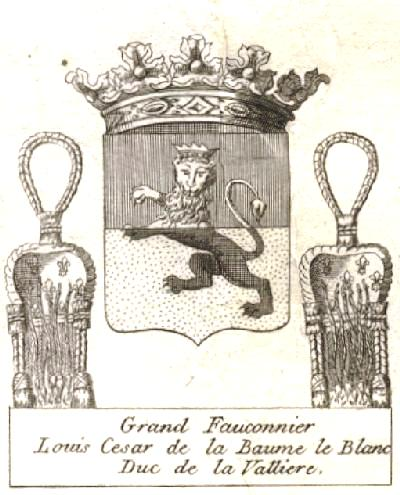
Arms as Grand Falconer of France

Louis César de La Baume Le Blanc (French pronunciation: [lwi sezaʁ də la bom lə blɑ̃]), duc de Vaujours, duc de La Vallière (9 October 1708 – 16 November 1780), was a French nobleman, bibliophile and military man. The present duc d'Uzès and duc de Luynes descend from him.

== Early life ==
Louis César was the son of Charles François de La Baume Le Blanc, marquis and then duc de La Vallière, and his wife, Marie Thérèse de Noailles, a daughter of Anne Jules de Noailles, duc de Noailles.

His father was a nephew of Louise de La Vallière, the first official mistress of King Louis XIV. On his father's side of the family, Louis César's relatives at court included Louise de La Vallière's daughter by Louis XIV, Marie Anne de Bourbon, princesse de Conti. On his mother's side, his aunt was Marie Victoire de Noailles, the wife of Louis Alexandre de Bourbon, comte de Toulouse, and mother of Louis Jean Marie de Bourbon, duc de Penthièvre, the wealthiest man in France during Louis César's lifetime. His uncle, Adrien Maurice de Noailles, married Françoise Charlotte d'Aubigné, the niece of Madame de Maintenon. Another cousin was Louis de Pardaillan de Gondrin, duc d'Antin, a great-grandson of Madame de Montespan.

When Louise de La Vallière left Versailles for a religious life after her displacement in the king's affections by Madame de Montespan, she gave the duchies of Vaujours and La Vallière to her daughter, the princesse de Conti. The princess sold them in 1698 to Louis César's father. From his birth, Louis César was known at court as the marquis de La Vallière. His father retained the Vaujours title for himself until his own death in 1739.

In 1727, at the early age of nineteen, Louis César was promoted to the rank of colonel of the regiment under the title of duc de La Vallière. In 1730, his father also gave him the duchy of Vaujours. With this new title came the rank of pair de France. Even though his father officially gave up the duchy in 1732, he was still styled at court as the duc de Vaujours.

== Career ==
Upon his father's death in 1739, Louis César became the new duc de La Vallière and was made the governor of Bourbonnais. In addition, he inherited the Château de Champs-sur-Marne. Around 1750, he added a beautiful rococo salon chinois (Chinese salon) to the château with wall paintings by noted artist Christophe Huet. The property had been given to his father by his cousin, the princesse de Conti, in 1718 in order to settle some debts. At the château, Louis César entertained many of the famous writers of the day, including Diderot, Voltaire, d'Alembert and François-Augustin de Paradis de Moncrif, with whom he also corresponded regularly.

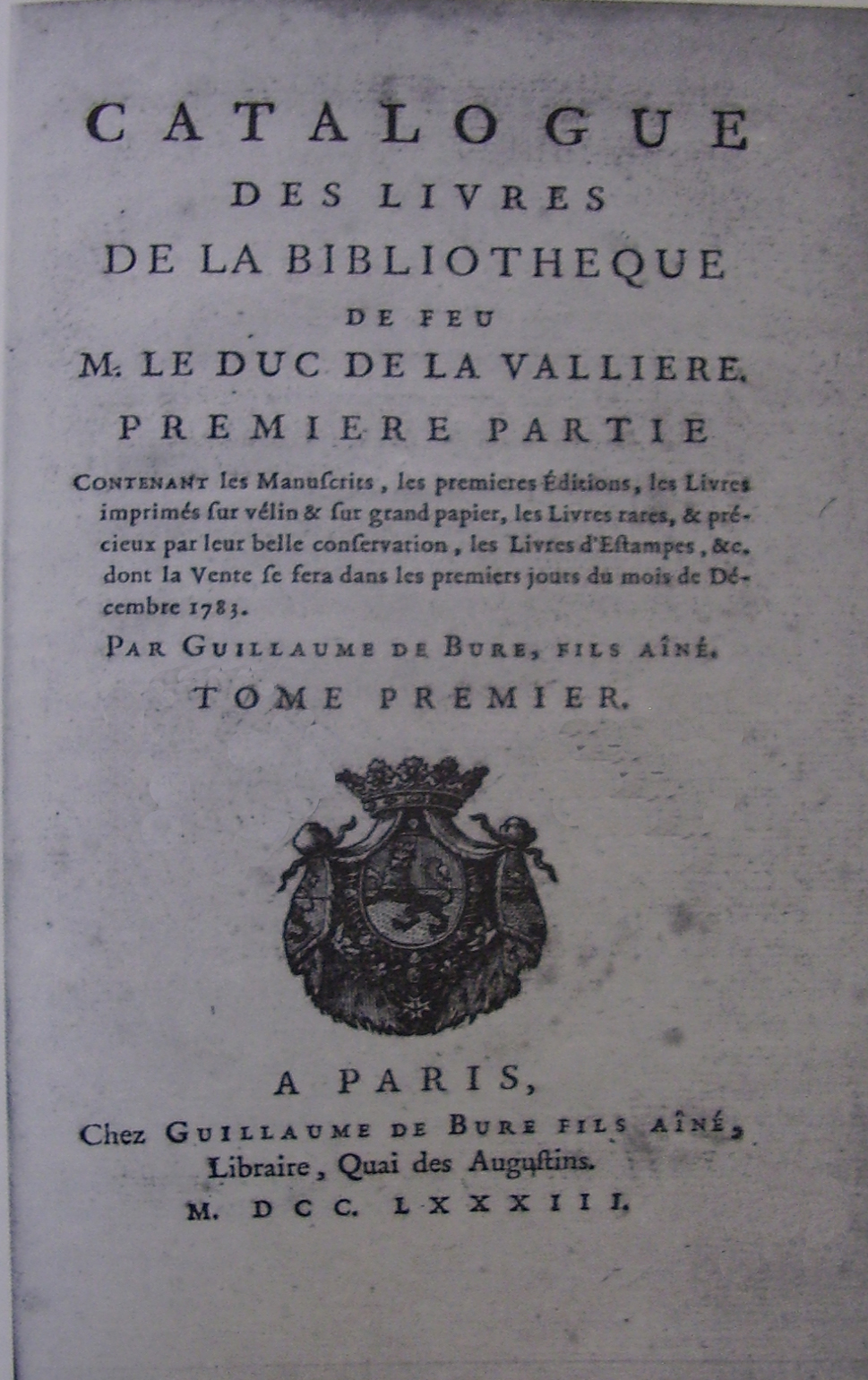
Catalogue of the first part of the sale of his library, 1783

Monsieur de La Vallière was also created the Captain of the Hunt by Louis XV as well as the Grand Falconer of France in 1748. Louis XV respected him, and Louis César became close with the king's mistress, the famous Madame de Pompadour, who named him the master of her private theatre. In 1749, the king bestowed upon him the Order of the Holy Spirit in a ceremony which took place at the Palace of Versailles on 25 May. The order was the most prestigious in France.

After the construction of a magnificent new château at Montrouge around 1750, the duke gradually abandoned the Château de Champs-sur-Marne. Eventually, he tried to sell the estate, but he could not find a buyer and was forced to rent it out. Between July 1757 and January 1759, he leased the estate to Madame de Pompadour for 12,000 livres per year. The marquise spent 200,000 livres in less than eighteen months to renovate the château. In November 1757, she received the prince de Soubise after his defeat at the Battle of Rossbach. As the king did not like the château, the marquise left it at the beginning of 1759. In 1763, the duke finally sold Champs to Gabriel Michel de Tharon (1702–1765), a rich shipowner.

Louis César was one of the greatest bibliophiles of his time. With the assistance of his librarian, the abbé Rive, he bought entire libraries and sold whatever he already had. His great library was eventually sold in three stages, first in 1767; then in 1783 and again in 1788. Part of the famous collection was acquired by the Comte d'Artois, brother of Louis XVI and future king of France. That part of the library was incorporated into the Bibliothèque de l'Arsenal in Paris.

The duke also wrote two books: Ballets, opera, et autres ouvrages lyriques (1760) and the Bibliothèque du Théâtre-Français (1768, 3 vol. in-12). The latter was edited by Barthélemy Mercier de Saint-Léger.

== Personal life ==
In 1732, Louis César married Jeanne Julie Françoise de Crussol d'Uzès, the daughter of Jean Charles de Crussol, 7th Duke of Uzès. His wife was a member of the House of Crussol, the most important peers in France after that of the Princes of the Blood. Louis César and his wife, Jeanne Julie Françoise, had only one child, a daughter.

- Adrienne Emilie Félicité de La Baume Le Blanc (1740–1812), duchesse de Châtillon et de La Vallière, dame de Wideville, who married Louis Gaucher, duc de Châtillon, in 1756 and had issue.

As the duchy of La Vallière had previously been held by several women, including Louise de La Vallière and her daughter, the princesse de Conti, his daughter was able to inherit the title. On her death, however, the title became extinct.

== Ancestry ==
Ancestors of Louis César de La Baume Le Blanc

16. Jean de La Baume Le Blanc
8. Laurent de La Baume Le Blanc
17. Françoise de Beauvau
4. Jean François de La Baume Le Blanc; Brother of Louise de La Vallière
18. Jean Le Prévost, Seigneur de la Coutelaye
9. Françoise Le Provost
19. Elisabeth Martin de Mauroy
2. Charles François de la Baume Le Blanc
10. Jean Glé, Seigneur de La Cottardaie, Baron de Becherel et Medreac
5. Gabrielle Glé de La Cotardais
11. Marie de Montigny, Comtesse de Beaufort, Baronne de Tiersan
1. Louis César de La Baume Le Blanc, Duke of La Vallière
24. François de Noailles, Count of Ayen
12. Anne de Noailles, Duke of Noailles
25. Rose de Roquelaure
6. Anne Jules de Noailles, Duke of Noailles
26. Antoine Boyer, Lord of Sainte-Geneviève-des-Bois
13. Louise Boyer
27. Françoise de Wignacourt
3. Marie Thérèse de Noailles
14. Ambroise-François, Duke of Bournonville
7. Marie-Françoise de Bournonville
15. Lucrece-Francoise de la Vieuville

== Sources ==
- Cardinal Georges Grente (dir.), Dictionnaire des lettres françaises. Le XVIIIe siècle, nlle. édition revue et mise à jour sous la direction de François Moureau, Paris, Fayard, 1995
- Louis César de La Baume Le Blanc, duc de La Vallière », dans Gustave Vapereau, Dictionnaire universel des littératures, Paris, Hachette, 1876, 2 volumes
- Dominique Coq, « Le parangon du bibliophile français : le duc de La Vallière et sa collection », dans : Histoire des bibliothèques françaises, Cl. Jolly dir., Paris, Promodis Cercle de la Librairie, 1988
