= Louis, Grand Dauphin =

Heir apparent of Louis XIV (1661–1711)

Louis
- Dauphin of France
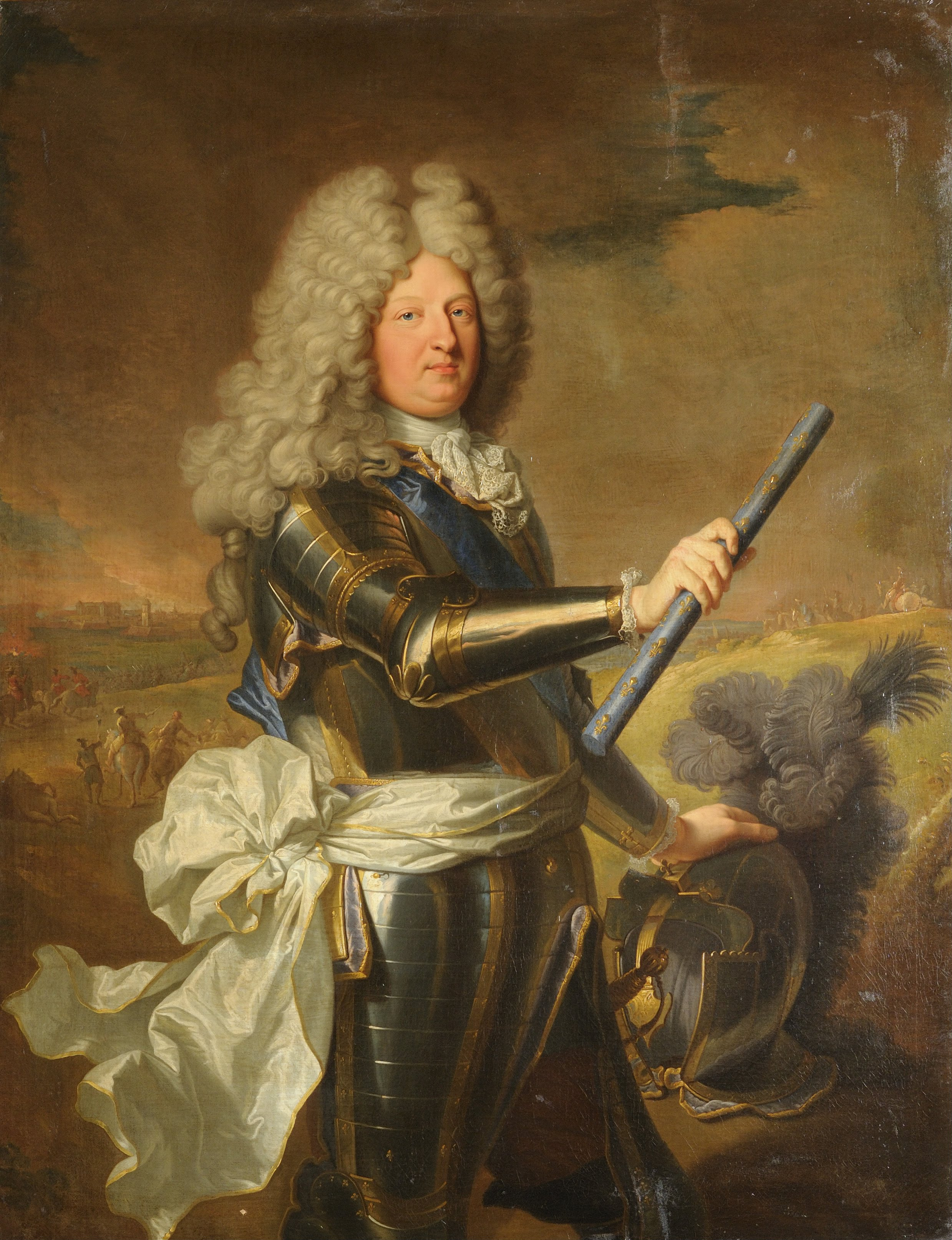
- Portrait by Hyacinthe Rigaud, 1697
- Born: 1 November 1661; Château de Fontainebleau, France
- Died: 14 April 1711 (aged 49); Château de Meudon, France
- Burial: 28 April 1711; Royal Basilica of Saint Denis, France
- Spouses: Maria Anna Victoria of Bavaria (m. 1680; died 1690) Marie Émilie de Joly de Choin (morganatic) (m. 1695)
- Issue Detail: Louis, Duke of Burgundy; Philip V of Spain; Charles, Duke of Berry
- House: Bourbon
- Father: Louis XIV
- Mother: Maria Theresa of Spain

Louis, Dauphin of France (1 November 1661 – 14 April 1711), commonly known as le Grand Dauphin, was the eldest son of King Louis XIV and his spouse, Maria Theresa of Spain and heir apparent to the French throne.

He became known as the Grand Dauphin after the birth of his own son, Louis, Duke of Burgundy, the Petit (little) Dauphin. Both of them died before King Louis XIV and thus never became king. Instead, the Grand Dauphin's grandson became King Louis XV at the death of Louis XIV, and his second son inherited the Spanish throne as Philip V through his grandmother, founding the Spanish Bourbon line.

== Biography ==
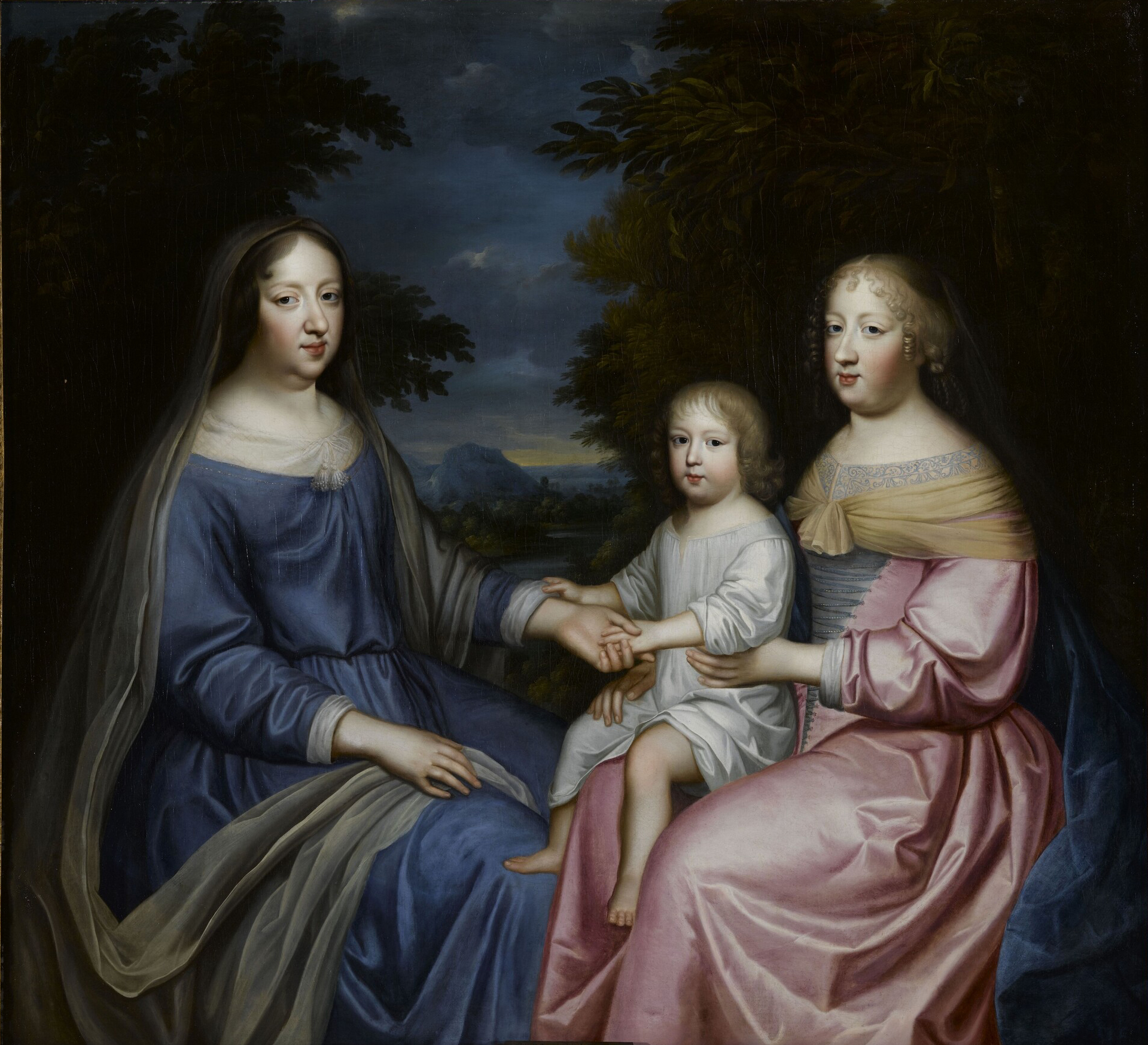
Anne of Austria with her grandson the Dauphin and Maria Theresa 1665.

Louis was born on 1 November 1661 at the Château de Fontainebleau, the eldest son of Louis XIV and Maria Theresa of Spain (who were double-first cousins to each other). As a Fils de France ("Son of France") he was entitled to the style of Royal Highness.

He was baptised on 24 March 1662 at the chapel of the Château de Saint-Germain-en-Laye and given his father's name of Louis. At the ceremony, the Cardinal de Vendôme and the Princess of Conti acted as proxies for the godparents, Pope Clement IX and Henrietta Maria of England. The latter was Louis's great-aunt. It was for this occasion that Jean-Baptiste Lully composed the motet Plaude Laetare Gallia.

He was initially under the care of royal governesses, among them being Julie d'Angennes and Louise de Prie de La Mothe-Houdancourt. When Louis reached the age of seven, he was removed from the care of women and placed in a society of men. He received Charles de Sainte-Maure, as his governor and was tutored by the great French preacher and orator Jacques-Bénigne Bossuet, the Bishop of Meaux, seemingly without acceptable results.

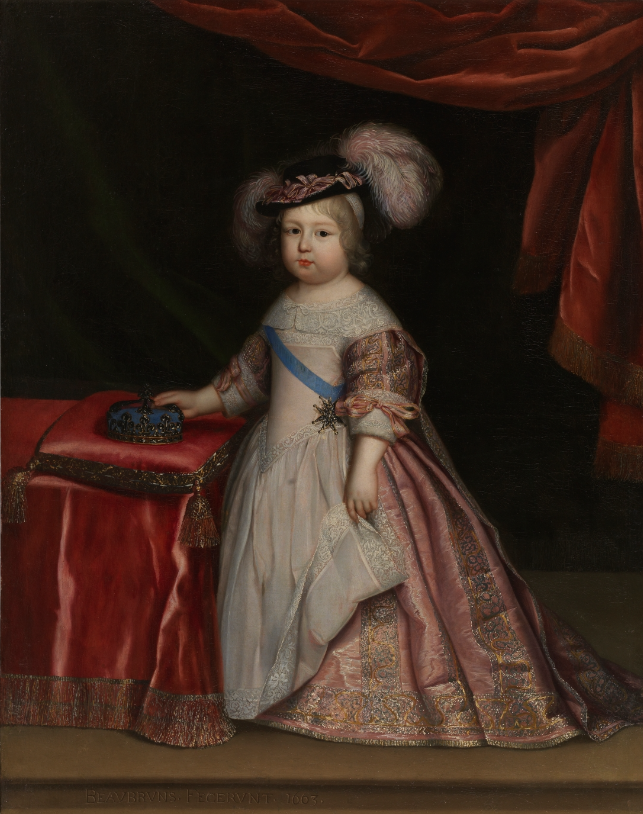
The Dauphin aged one by Charles Beaubrun, c. 1663

The Duke of Saint-Simon wrote in his Mémoires that the Monseigneur, who had neither vices nor virtues, was, in his opinion, devoid of any wisdom and knowledge and "radically incapable of acquiring any" and that aside from being very lazy, he was without imagination or any capacity for thinking, as well as devoid of any taste, apathetic and "born to boredom".

Saint-Simon, who for many years had placed all his hopes for a future enlightened government of France in the eldest son of the Grand Dauphin, admitted that on the day that the prince died, he had flashes of joy crossing his mind at the thought that he would soon be gone, both himself and France having all to gain from the unexpected death of the Grand Dauphin, adding that "to his extreme shame" he couldn’t help having fleeting moments of anxiety during that day at the thought that the sick prince might survive his illness.

Philippe Erlanger writes the following in his book about the life of Louis XIV:

Louis XIV secretly nursed the same suspicious jealousy of the Grand Dauphin that Louis XIII had once shown to himself. No prince could have been less deserving of such feelings.

The Monseigneur, as the heir to the throne was now known to have inherited his mother's docility and low intelligence. All his life he remained petrified with admiration of his formidable father and stood in fear of him even while lavish proofs of 'affection' were showered upon him. The best way for the Monseigneur to do someone an injury was to commend him to the royal favour. He knew it, and did not conceal it from his rare petitioners.

Louis XIV saw to it that his son's upbringing was quite the opposite of his own. Instead of a devoted mother and an affectionate and likeable tutor, the Dauphin had the repellent and misanthropic Duc de Montausier, who ruthlessly applied the same methods that had so disturbed Louis XIII. They annihilated his grandson.

Bossuet overwhelmed his backward pupil with such splendid lessons that the Dauphin developed a lasting horror of books, learning and history. By the age of eighteen, the Monseigneur had assimilated almost none of the knowledge amassed to so little purpose, and the apathy of his mind was second only to that of his senses.

He was perceived to be very slothful. As an adult, his favorite amusement was lying stretched in a sofa tapping the point of his shoes with a cane. Nonetheless, his generosity, affability, and liberality gave him great popularity in Paris and with the French people in general. Louis was one of six legitimate children of his parents. The others all died in early childhood; the second longest-lived, Marie Thérèse of France, died at the age of five when Louis was 11.

According to John B. Wolf, Louis XIV had a low opinion of his son, writing:

...indolent, fatuous, and dull, only the saving grace of his bourgeois morals kept him from outraging the pious people about him. Like his father he enjoyed the hunt, but that was about the only way in which this disappointing son resembled his father.

Being especially interested in geopolitical ties his son could help him form, the King considered various European royal daughters as possible wives for his heir, such as Anna Maria Luisa de' Medici and Louis' cousin Marie Louise d'Orléans, daughter of Philippe I, Duke of Orléans and Henrietta of England. According to various sources, Marie Louise and Louis were in love and had grown up with each other. However, Louis XIV decided to use Marie Louise to instead forge a link with Spain and made her marry the invalid Charles II of Spain, the Dauphin's half-uncle.

Louis was eventually engaged to his second cousin, Maria Anna Victoria of Bavaria, when he was seven. She was a year older than Louis and, upon arriving at the French court, was described as being very unattractive. Nonetheless, she was a very cultured princess, and made a good first impression as she was able to speak French fluently.

They were married by proxy in Munich on 28 January 1680; the couple met for the first time on 7 March 1680 in Châlons-sur-Marne.

== Political and military role ==
Although he was permitted at first to attend and later to participate in the Conseil d'en haut, Louis did not play an important part in French politics. Nonetheless, as the heir to the throne, he was constantly surrounded by cabals battling for future prominence. Apart from the minor political role that he played during his father's reign, Louis engaged in more leisurely pursuits and was esteemed for his magnificent collection of art at Versailles and Meudon. Louis XIV purchased Château Meudon for him from the widow of Louvois.

The Dauphin employed Jules Hardouin Mansart and the office of the Bâtiments du Roi but most particularly his long-term "house designer", Jean Bérain, head of the Menus Plaisirs, to provide new decors. He lived quietly at Meudon for the remainder of his life and was surrounded by his two half-sisters Marie Anne de Bourbon and the Princess of Condé, both of whom he loved dearly. The three made up the main part of the Cabal de Meudon, which opposed the Dauphin's son Louis and his Savoyard wife, the Duchess of Burgundy.

During the War of the Grand Alliance, he was sent in 1688 to the Rhineland front. Before leaving the court, Louis was thus instructed by his father:

In sending you to command my army, I am giving you an opportunity to make known your merit; go and show it to all Europe, so that when I come to die it will not be noticed that the King is dead.

There, Louis succeeded, under the tutelage of Marshal de Duras and Vauban, in taking one of the bridgeheads across the Rhine, Philippsburg, which was surrounded by marshes. Louis's courage was shown when he visited the soldiers in the inundated trenches under heavy fire to observe the progress of the siege. Montausier, his former governor, wrote to him:

I shall not compliment you on the taking of Philippsburg; you had a good army, bombs, cannons and Vauban. I shall not compliment you because you are brave. That virtue is hereditary. But I rejoice with you that you have been liberal, generous, humane, and have recognised the services of those who did well.

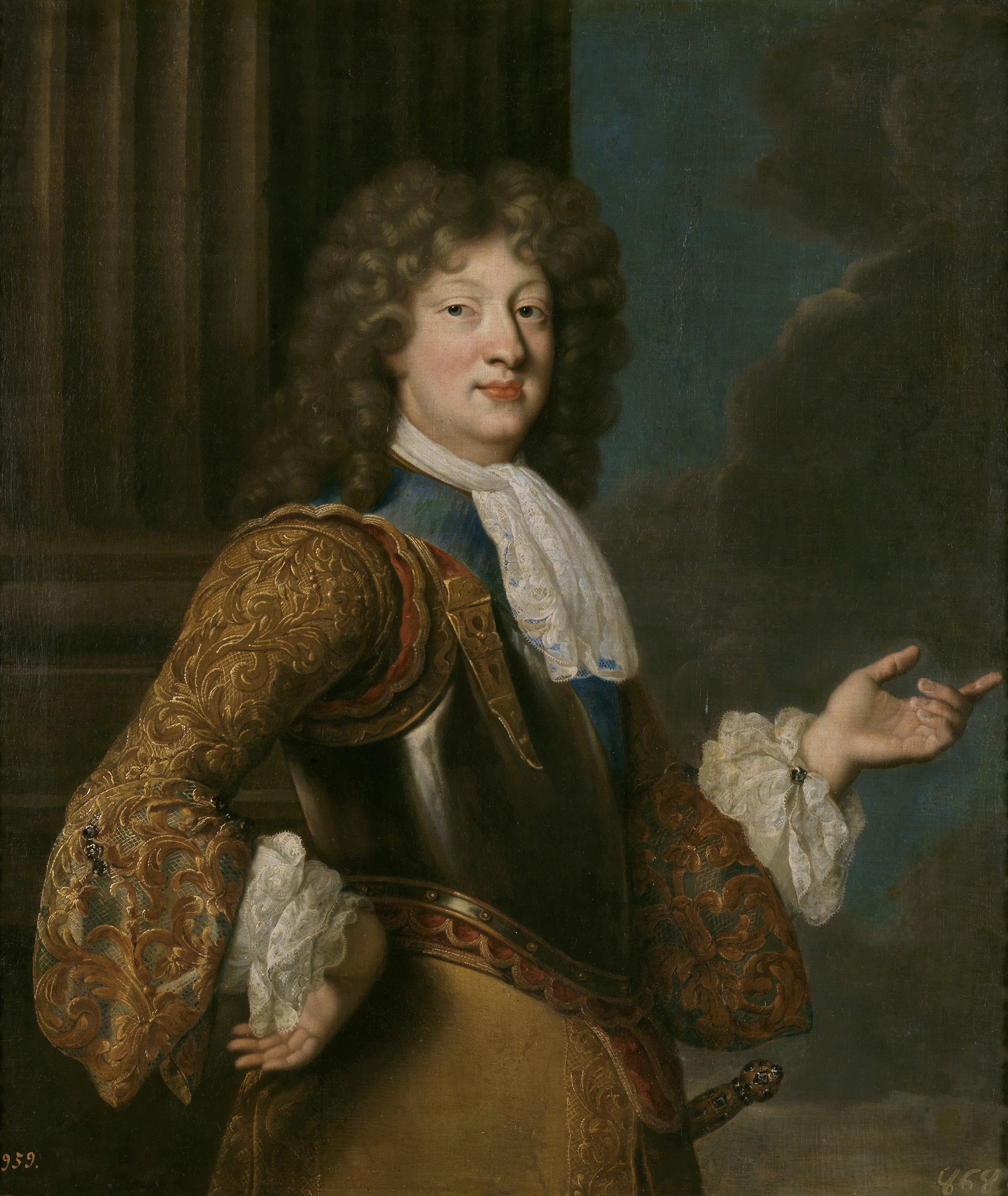
The Grand Dauphin

Louis's capture of Philippsburg prevented the large gathering Imperial Army from crossing the Rhine and invading Alsace.

Louis's position in the Conseil d'en haut gave him an opportunity to have his voice heard in the years and in the crises leading up to the War of the Spanish Succession. From his mother, Louis had rights and claims to the Spanish throne.

His uncle Charles II of Spain had produced no descendants and, as he lay dying, had no heir to whom he could pass the throne. The choice of a successor was essentially split between the French and Austrian claimants. To improve the chances of a Bourbon succession, Louis gave up his and his eldest son's rights in favour of his second son, Philip, Duke of Anjou (later Philip V of Spain), who, as the second son, was not expected to succeed to the French throne, which would thus keep France and Spain separate. Moreover, in the discussions in the Conseil d'en haut regarding the French response to Charles II's last will and testament, which indeed left all Spanish possessions to Anjou, Louis persuasively argued for acceptance. He opposed those who advocated a rejection of the will and the adherence to the Partition Treaty, which was signed with William III of England, even though the treaty had awarded Naples, Sicily and Tuscany to him.

Louis died of smallpox on 14 April 1711, at the age of 49, and so predeceased his father.

== Literary tribute ==
- The Delphin Classics were a large edition of the Latin classics, edited in the 1670s for Louis (Delphin is the adjective derived from dauphin) and known for being written (unlike some other treatments) entirely in that language. Thirty-eight scholars contributed to the series, which was edited by Pierre Huet, with assistance from several co-editors including Jacques-Bénigne Bossuet and Anne Dacier.

== Marriages ==
Louis married Duchess Maria Anna of Bavaria on 7 March 1680. She was known in France as Dauphine Marie Anne Victoire. Although the marriage was not a close one, the couple had three sons. The Dauphine died in 1690 and in 1695 Louis secretly married his lover Marie Émilie de Joly de Choin. His new wife did not acquire the status of Dauphine of France, and the marriage remained without surviving issue. Pregnant at the time of her marriage, de Choin gave birth to a son, who was secretly sent to the countryside; the child died at age two, in 1697, without having been publicly named.

=== Issue ===
- Louis, Duke of Burgundy (16 August 1682 – 18 February 1712), Duke of Burgundy and later Dauphin of France; married his double-second cousin, Marie Adélaïde of Savoy, elder daughter of the Duke of Savoy and was the father of the future Louis XV;
- Philip V, King of Spain (19 December 1683 – 9 July 1746), Duke of Anjou and later King of Spain; married firstly his double-second cousin, Maria Luisa of Savoy, younger daughter of the Duke of Savoy, and had issue; married, secondly, Elisabeth Farnese and had issue including the future Dauphine of France, Infanta Maria Teresa Rafaela of Spain and Charles III, the future King of Spain and Mariana Victoria, the Queen of Portugal.
- Charles, Duke of Berry (31 July 1686 – 5 May 1714), Duke of Berry, of Alençon and of Angoulême, Count of Ponthieu; married Marie Louise Élisabeth d'Orléans and had issue but none survived over a year.

Thus, through his two older sons Burgundy and Anjou, Louis ensured, respectively, the continuation of the senior Bourbon line on the throne of France and the establishment of the Spanish Bourbon dynasty.

Besides his unnamed child with Mme de Choin, Louis had two illegitimate daughters with Françoise Pitel:

- Anne Louise de Bourbon (1695 – August 1716) – wife of Anne Errard d'Avaugour;
- Charlotte de Fleury (6 February 1697 – 1750) – wife of Gérard Michel de La Jonchère.

With another mistress, Marie Anne Caumont de La Force, he had one daughter:

- Louise Émilie de Vautedard (1694–1719) – wife of Nicolas Mesnager.

== Ancestry ==
Louis's paternal grandparents were Louis XIII of France and Anne of Austria; he was descended, on his mother's side, from Philip IV of Spain and Élisabeth of France. Louis XIII and Élisabeth were siblings (the children of Henry IV of France and Marie de' Medici), as were Anne of Austria and Philip IV, who were the children of Philip III of Spain and Margaret of Austria. That means that he had only four great-grandparents instead of the usual eight, and that his double-cousin parents had the same coefficient of co-ancestry (1/4) as if they were half-siblings.

Ancestors of Louis of France

8. Henry IV of France (= 14)
4. Louis XIII of France
9. Marie de' Medici (= 15)
2. Louis XIV of France
10. Philip III of Spain (= 12)
5. Anne of Spain
11. Margaret of Austria (= 13)
1. Louis de France, Le Grand Dauphin
12. Philip III of Spain (= 10)
6. Philip IV of Spain
13. Margaret of Austria (= 11)
3. Maria Theresa of Spain
14. Henry IV of France (= 8)
7. Elisabeth of France
15. Marie de' Medici (= 9)

Louis, Grand Dauphin House of Bourbon Cadet branch of the Capetian dynasty Born: 1 November 1661 Died: 14 April 1711
French royalty
Vacant Title last held by Louis	Dauphin of France; 1 November 1661 – 14 April 1711	Succeeded by Louis, Duke of Burgundy
