= Château de Champs-sur-Marne =

Neoclassical château in Champs-sur-Marne, France

Coordinates: 48°51′14″N 2°36′15″E

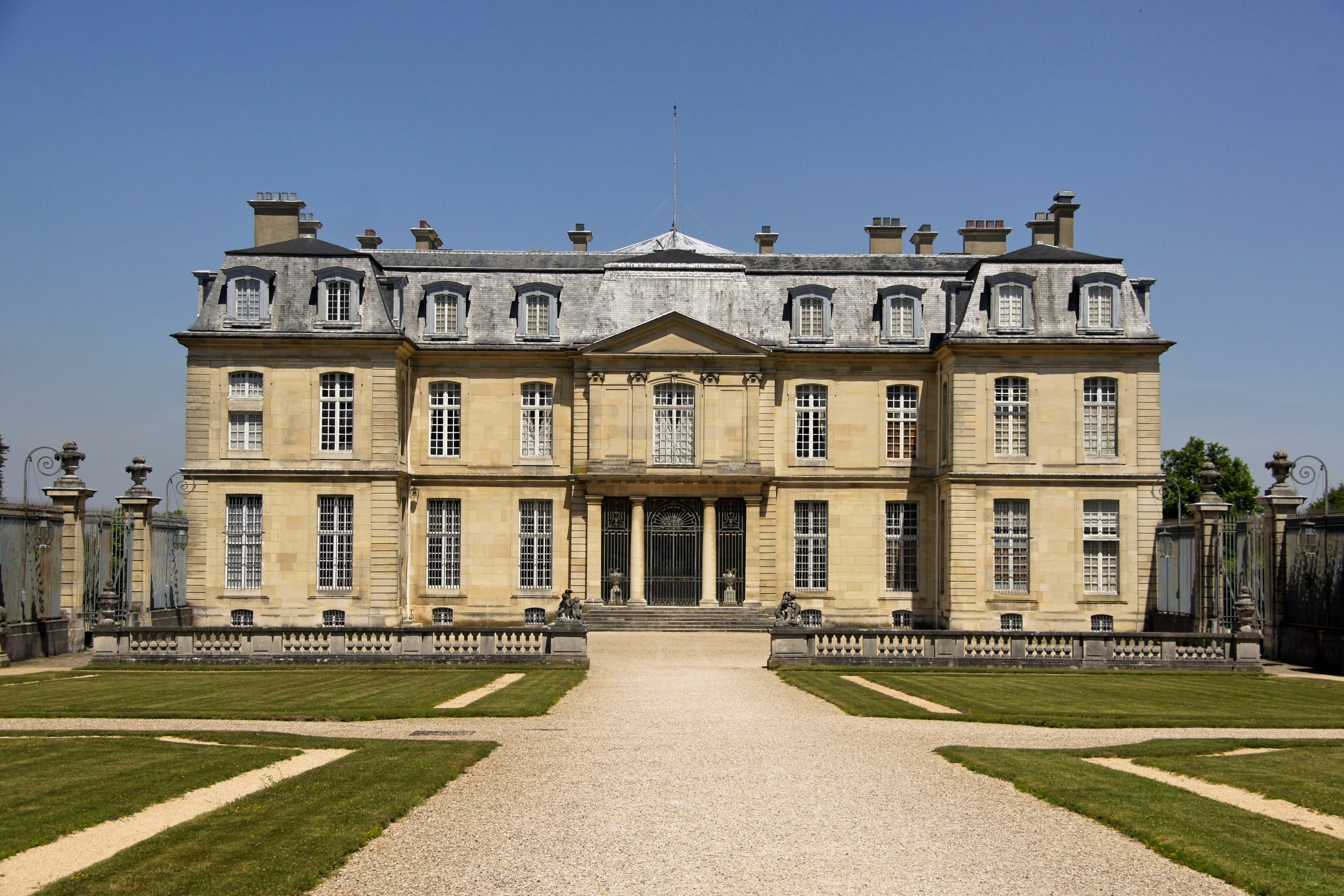
The Château de Champs-sur-Marne

The Château de Champs-sur-Marne (French pronunciation: [ʃato d(ə) ʃɑ̃ syʁ maʁn]) is a neoclassical château in Champs-sur-Marne, France. It was built in its present form for the treasurer Charles Renouard de la Touane in 1699 by Pierre Bullet, architecte du roi. After the first proprietor's bankruptcy, another financier, Paul Poisson de Bourvalais, took up the project. Jean-Baptiste Bullet de Chamblain, the son of Pierre Bullet, finished Champs in 1706.

Ten years later, Paul Poisson was in the Bastille on charges of embezzlement and the château was seized by the Crown. In 1718, it was sold to the princesse de Conti, natural daughter of King Louis XIV and his first official mistress, Louise de La Vallière. That same year, however, the princess cancelled a debt by deeding Champs to her first cousin, the duc de La Vallière. When the duke died in 1739, he left the château to his son and heir, the famous bibliophile, Louis César de La Baume Le Blanc. The new duc de La Vallière was later to become a trusted friend of King Louis XV and his mistress, Madame de Pompadour.

Around 1750, the duke added a beautiful rococo salon chinois (Chinese salon) to the château with wall paintings by noted artist Christophe Huet. At the château, Louis César entertained many of the famous writers of the day, including Diderot, Voltaire, d'Alembert and François-Augustin de Paradis de Moncrif, with whom he also corresponded regularly.

After the construction of a magnificent new château at Montrouge around 1750, however, the duke gradually abandoned the Château de Champs-sur-Marne. Eventually, he tried to sell the domain, but he could not find a buyer and was forced to rent it out. Between July 1757 and January 1759, he leased the estate to Madame de Pompadour for 12,000 livres per year. The marquise spent 200,000 livres in less than eighteen months to renovate the château. In November 1757, she received the prince de Soubise there after his defeat at the Battle of Rossbach. As the king did not like the château, the marquise left it at the beginning of 1759. In 1763, the duke finally sold Champs to Gabriel Michel de Tharon (1702–1765), a rich shipowner. Upon his death, the residence did not pass to his children but rather to the state. In 1779, King Louis XVI took over the administration of the residence and allowed his younger sister, Madame Élisabeth of France, to retire to the Chateau whenever she wished to leave Versailles. However, the finance minister Jean-François Joly de Fleury warned the king that managing and paying the costs of a residence other than his was a unnecessary expense. The king opted to acquire the Chateau de Montreuil for his sister in 1783 To get rid of the castle expenses and give it a property of its own.

In 1820, Armand Santerre, nephew of the Revolutionary General Antoine Joseph Santerre, bought the parc Saint Martin surrounding the château. In 1855, his brother Ernest Santerre bought the château as well. Later, in 1895, it was finally sold to comte Louis Cahen d'Anvers, who thoroughly restored it, installing boiseries designed by Germain Boffrand that had been removed from the Hôtel de Mayenne, Paris, and recreated its parterre gardens in the hands of Achille Duchêne. Marcel Proust was among the guests in this era at Champs. Louis Cahen d'Anvers' son Charles made a gift of it to the state in 1935.

The residence was modernised in 1959 to ready it for visiting heads of state of the French Union. In 1974 it was opened to the public and ceased its official capacity. It has served as a location for many films since then, while the Monuments Historiques employ some outbuildings as research facilities.

The château looks onto a grand parterre with two basins and an extended central axis that sweeps down all the way to the Marne, laid out about 1710 by Claude Desgotz, the nephew and pupil of André Le Nôtre; it is surrounded by a landscape park laid out in the nineteenth century in the English fashion.

Cyclone Lothar, the storm of 26 December 1999 did a great deal of damage to mature woodland in the park.
