= Marie Émilie de Joly de Choin =

French lady-in-waiting

Marie Émilie de Joly
- Mademoiselle de Choin
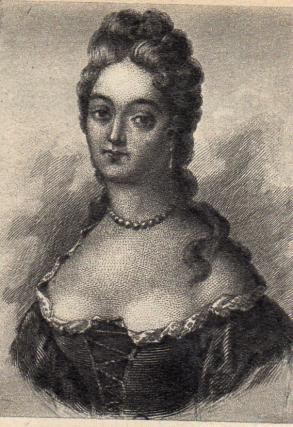
- Full name: Marie Émilie Thérèse de Joly
- Born: 2 August 1670; Bourg-en-Bresse, France
- Died: 14 April 1732 (aged 61); Rue des Tournelles, Paris, France
- Buried: Cemetery of Saint Paul des Champs
- Spouse: Louis, Grand Dauphin (morganatic) (m. 1695)
- Issue: a son, 1695–1697
- Father: Claude de Joly, Baron de Choin
- Mother: Anne Clémence Bonne, Dame de Grolée

Marie Émilie Thérèse de Joly, "Mademoiselle de Choin" (2 August 1670 – 14 April 1732) was a French lady-in-waiting, the lover and later the morganatic spouse of Louis, Dauphin of France. As a morganatic spouse, she was not styled Dauphine of France.

== Biography ==
=== Background ===
Marie Émilie was born in Bourg-en-Bresse to Guillaume Claude de Joly, Baron de Choin, and his wife, Anne Clemence de Grolee de Mepieu. She was a lady-in-waiting to the king's favourite legitimated daughter, Marie Anne de Bourbon, Princess of Conti. Marie Émilie was considered to be unattractive but spiritual. The Duke of Saint-Simon described her as "a large, flat-chested, dark-haired, ugly, snub-nosed girl, with wit and a knack for intrigue and manipulation. She was constantly seeing Monseigneur, who never left the house of Madame la Princesse de Conti. She amused him, and without anyone noticing, she gained his trust." (Note: « une grosse fille écrasée, brune, laide, camarde, avec de l'esprit et un esprit d'intrigue et de manège. Elle voyait sans cesse Monseigneur, qui ne bougeait de chez Mme la princesse de Conti. Elle l'amusa, et sans qu'on s'en aperçût, se mit intimement dans sa confiance »[)

Louis, le Grand dauphin fell in love with her after the death of his consort in 1690 and began a liaison with her. Simultaneously, she was in a relationship with Count Francois Alphonse de Clermont-Chaste, a member of the entourage of the maréchal de Luxembourg. Luxembourg advised Clermont-Chaste to marry Choin in order to acquire power over the dauphin through her. It was rumoured that Marie Émilie and Clerment-Chaste planned to dominate the throne by producing a child with her, which they would present as the child of Louis. When these plans were discovered, after the correspondence between Marie Émilie and Clerment was presented to the king, they were both exiled from court, which did not, however, permanently end her relationship with Louis.

=== Marriage ===
Marie Émilie married Louis secretly in 1694. No details are known of the ceremony, but on 19 July 1694, the Dauphin referred to her as his legal spouse in a letter to his father's morganatic wife, Madame de Maintenon. Nonetheless, the marriage was not officially recognised, Marie Émilie did not acquire the title of Dauphine, continuing to be officially referred to as Mademoiselle de Choin. She did not participate in court life.

Marie Émilie resided in the palace of Meudon, within which she imitated the role played at court by Madame de Maintenon, with whom she got along well, acting as her husband's hostess, receiving dukes and foreign diplomats. She was allowed to sit in a chair in the presence of members of the royal house and to call them by their names rather than by title. Yet she dressed simply, took no further advantage of the marriage and did not participate in politics.

The Dauphin had no children from this second union, although the historian Georges Mongrédien claims that Marie Émilie was pregnant at the time of her marriage and that a son was born in 1695 but died at the age of 2 years in Meudon (where his parents resided) in 1697 without receiving a legal name.

=== Later life and death ===
After Louis's death in 1711, she withdrew into retirement. Louis left her a fortune in his will, but she tore up the will with the words that when he was alive she needed only him and after his death only a pittance. Marie Emilie was given a pension by the king and devoted herself to charity, not participating in society life. She died in Paris, "universally respected for her private virtues".
