= Duchy of La Vallière =

The Duchy of La Vallière (duché de La Vallière) was a noble French title created on 13 May 1667 by Louis XIV for his one time mistress Louise Françoise de La Baume Le Blanc. It became extinct de facto in 1780 at the death of Louise's great-nephew Louis César de La Baume Le Blanc, the famous bibliophile and military man.

== History ==
Louise de La Vallière, known as Mademoiselle de La Vallière, was the mistress of Louis XIV from 1661 to 1667. Louise was the mother of six of Louis' children, of whom two survived infancy. The duchy was given the subsidiary title of Duke of Vaujours (duc de Vaujours).

The Lordship of La Vallière (seigneurie de La Vallière) had been owned by Louise's family since the lifetime of her great-grandfather Laurent Le Blanc. Laurent's only son Jean took on the name of La Baume Le Blanc in his lifetime. He was also the baron de La Papelardière. Louise was given the title after she was displaced by Madame de Montespan, who also had children with Louis.

When Louise left court, she gave the two duchies to her only daughter Marie Anne de Bourbon, Mademoiselle de Blois and widow of Louis Armand de Bourbon, prince de Conti. Widowed in 1685 aged 19 and childless. In 1698 Marie Anne gave the title to her cousin, Charles François de La Baume Le Blanc. Till then, Charles François had been styled the marquis de La Vallière.

After 1698 he took the ducal title as well as the duchy of Vaujours. When his son Louis César was born in 1708, he was styled as duc de Vaujours till the death of Charles François in 1739 when he succeeded to the Duchy of La Vallière. Louis César, close to Louis XV and his mistress Madame de Pompadour, was the great bibliophile who assembled a great library. He was a first cousin of Louis Jean Marie de Bourbon a grandson of Madame de Montespan and Louis XIV.

Louis César had one child: his daughter, Adrienne Emilie Félicité de La Baume Le Blanc, married the Duke of Châtillon in 1756 and succeeded to the title and was styled as duchesse de Châtillon et de La Vallière. At her death the title became extinct, her eldest daughter, Amable Emilie, marrying the duc de Crussol (another descendant of Madame de Montespan) and the youngest, Louise Emmanuelle, to Charles Bretagne Marie de La Trémoille.

The arms of the Duke of La Vallière (from 1723) were blazoned, coupé de gueules et d'Or au lion léopardé coupé d'argent et de sable ("per fess gules and Or a lion passant per fess argent and sable").

== Dukes of La Vallière ==
=== Duchesses of La Vallière (1667-1675) ===
Name	Portrait	Lifespan	Parents
Louise Françoise de La Baume Le Blanc; Mademoiselle de La Vallière; 1667-1675		6 August 1644 – 7 June 1710	Laurent de La Baume Le Blanc; Françoise Le Provost

=== Duchesses of La Vallière (1680-1698) ===
Name	Portrait	Lifespan	Parents
Marie Anne de Bourbon; Légitimée de France; Mademoiselle de Blois; Princess of Conti; 1680-1698		2 October 1666 - 3 May 1739	Louis XIV of France; Louise Françoise de La Baume Le Blanc

=== Dukes of La Vallière (1698-c.1780) ===
Name	Portrait	Lifespan	Parents
Charles François de La Baume Le Blanc; 1698-1739		c. 1665- 22 August 1739	Jean François de La Baume Le Blanc; Gabrielle Glé de La Cotardais
Louis César de La Baume Le Blanc; 1739-1780		9 October 1708 - 16 November 1780	Charles François de La Baume Le Blanc; Marie Thérèse de Noailles
Adrienne Emilie Félicité de La Baume Le Blanc; 1780–1812 styled duchesse de La Vallière		29 September 1740 - 15 May 1812	Louis César de La Baume Le Blanc; Jeanne Julie Françoise de Crussol d'Uzès
