= Charles de La Vieuville =

French noble and Superintendent of Finances of France from 1623 to 1653

- 1st Duke of La Vieuville
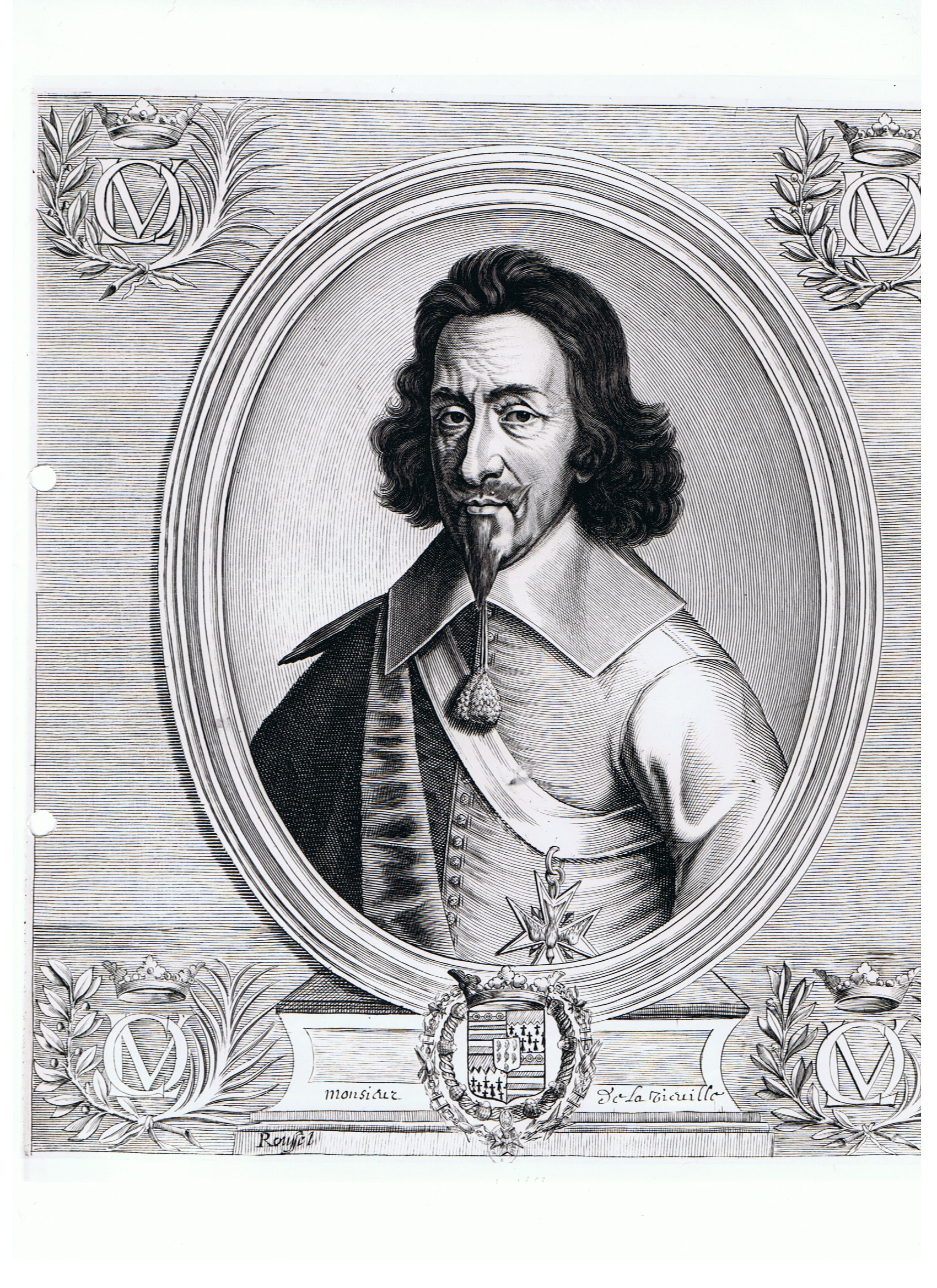

- Coat of arms
- Reign: Superintendent of Finances
- Noble family: La Vieuville
- Spouse: Marie Bouhier
- Father: Robert de La Vieuville
- Occupation: Superintendent of Finances

Charles de La Vieuville (1582 – 9 January 1653) first styled Marquis of La Vieuville but later created 1st Duke of La Vieuville was an important French noble and Superintendent of Finances of France from 1623 to 1624 and once again from 1651 to 1653 .

== Biography ==
He descended from the dynasty of the seigneurs of La Vieuville and was the son of Robert de La Vieuville and Catherine d'O. Being a grandnephew to François d'O, finance minister of both Henry III and Henry IV, he had good connections at court.

He started his career being Captain of the Garde Écossaise, where he quickly rose to favour of the King, so that already in 1619 he became a knight of the King's orders.

As the year 1623 passed, the King (who always sought an effective model of governance) found virtually all his major advisors (like Brûlart and Puysieux) and his previous superintendent, Henri de Schomberg, ineffective. This resulted partly because of an inclination towards Spain, the deadly enemy of France, by some of the ministers, as well as the inability of the military man Schomberg of governing the finances.

This vacuum of power was filled by La Vieuville, the trusted captain of the King's guards. During the years he was superintendent, and because he was the King's only advisor, he had a very important role at the French court. His views went quite well with Louis XIII's ‘’bon français’’ (good Frenchman) views. He advised the King to side with the Dutch and had the idea to interfere directly in the Bündner Wirren. Yet he didn't prove to fulfill quite what Louis XIII expected and Louis XIII became very disappointed with him. La Vieuville had grown very arrogant and incompetent and members of his family were very corrupt.

Another factor was that Cardinal Richelieu who had just entered the Royal Council, had previously published various pamphlets and spread several rumours against his rival La Vieuville, in order to become the King's advisor himself. Finally, he should have been executed, yet he fled from France to the Spanish Netherlands. Later in Louis XIII's reign he was pardoned and returned to France, eventually becoming superintendent once more during Louis XIV's early reign.

== Family and issue ==
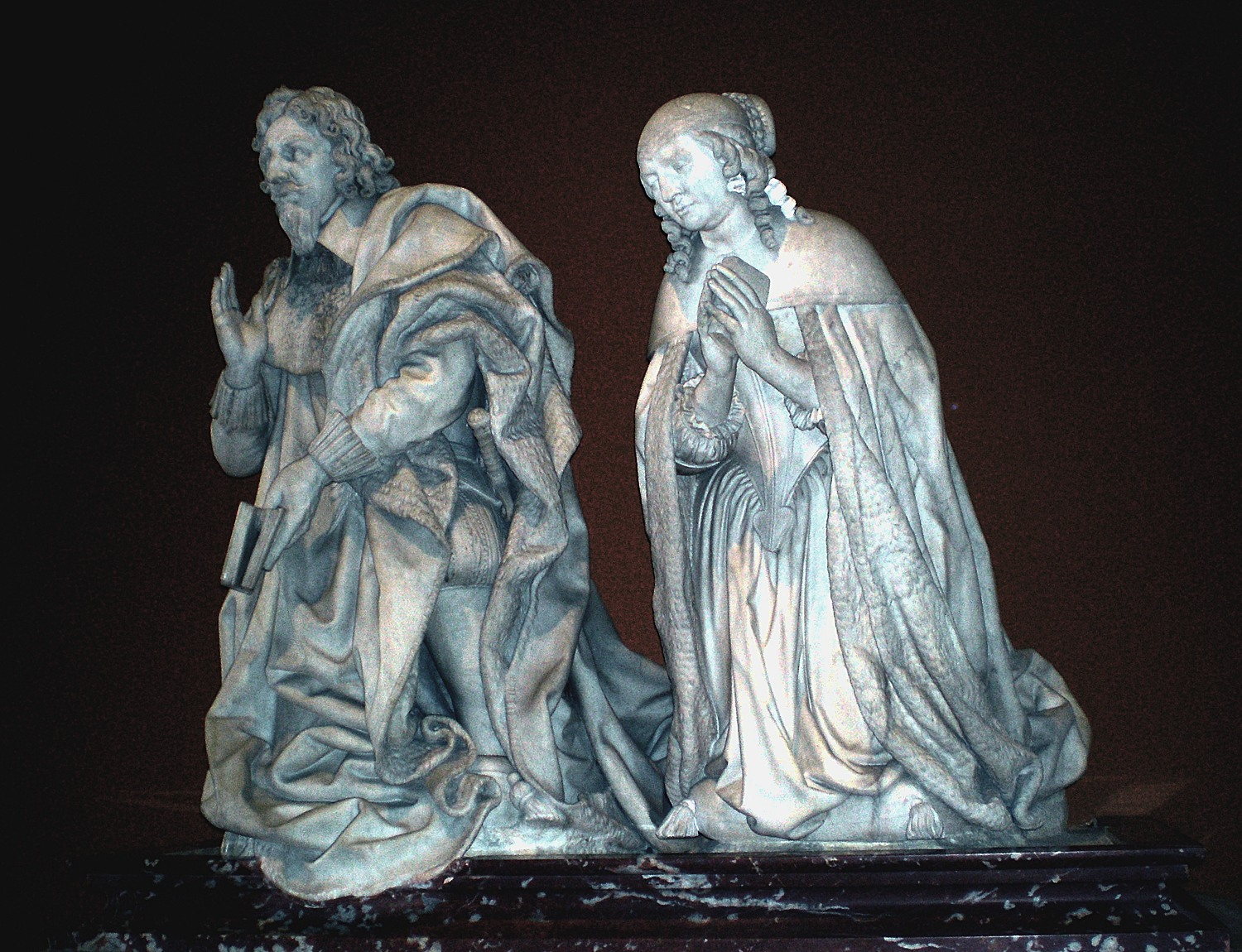
Effigy of Charles de La Vieuville and his wife (by Gilles Guérin)

La Vieuville married Marie Bouhier de Beaumarchais in 1611. Marie was the daughter of Vincent Bouhier, seigneur de Beaumarchais and held the titles of dame de Nogent-l'Artaud and baronne de Saint-Martin de Blois. She had a sister, Lucrèce, who was married to Nicolas de L'Hôpital.

La Vieuville had all his 13 children with Marie:

- Vincent; in service of Charles I of England; died in 1643 at the Battle of Newbury
- Charles II, duc de La Vieuville
- Charles-François, died 6 days old
- Henri, Knight of the Order of Malta, Maréchal des Armées et Camps du Roi, Abbot of Savigny (died in 1652)
- François-Henri, Abbot of Savigny (as successor of his brother), from 1660: Bishop of Rennes (died in 1675)
- Françoise de Paule, died in Flanders in 1635
- Louise, religious Carmelite nun, died at her convent in Paris
- Lucrèce-Françoise, married Ambroise-François, duc de Bournonville and Peer of France
- Marie, died in Brussels
- Marie, died at a young age, entered the Minims
- Dorothée, died young, entered the Mimins as well
- Marie, abesse of Notre-Dame de Meaux
- Henriette, religious, died at La Ferté-Milon

== Cultural depictions ==
- In the 1630s, La Vieuville was portrayed by the famous Flemish artist Anthony van Dyck
- La Vieuville's important role during the early reign of Louis XIII was portrayed by A. Lloyd Moote in his biography "Louis XIII, the Just"
