= Saulmory-Villefranche =

- Commune
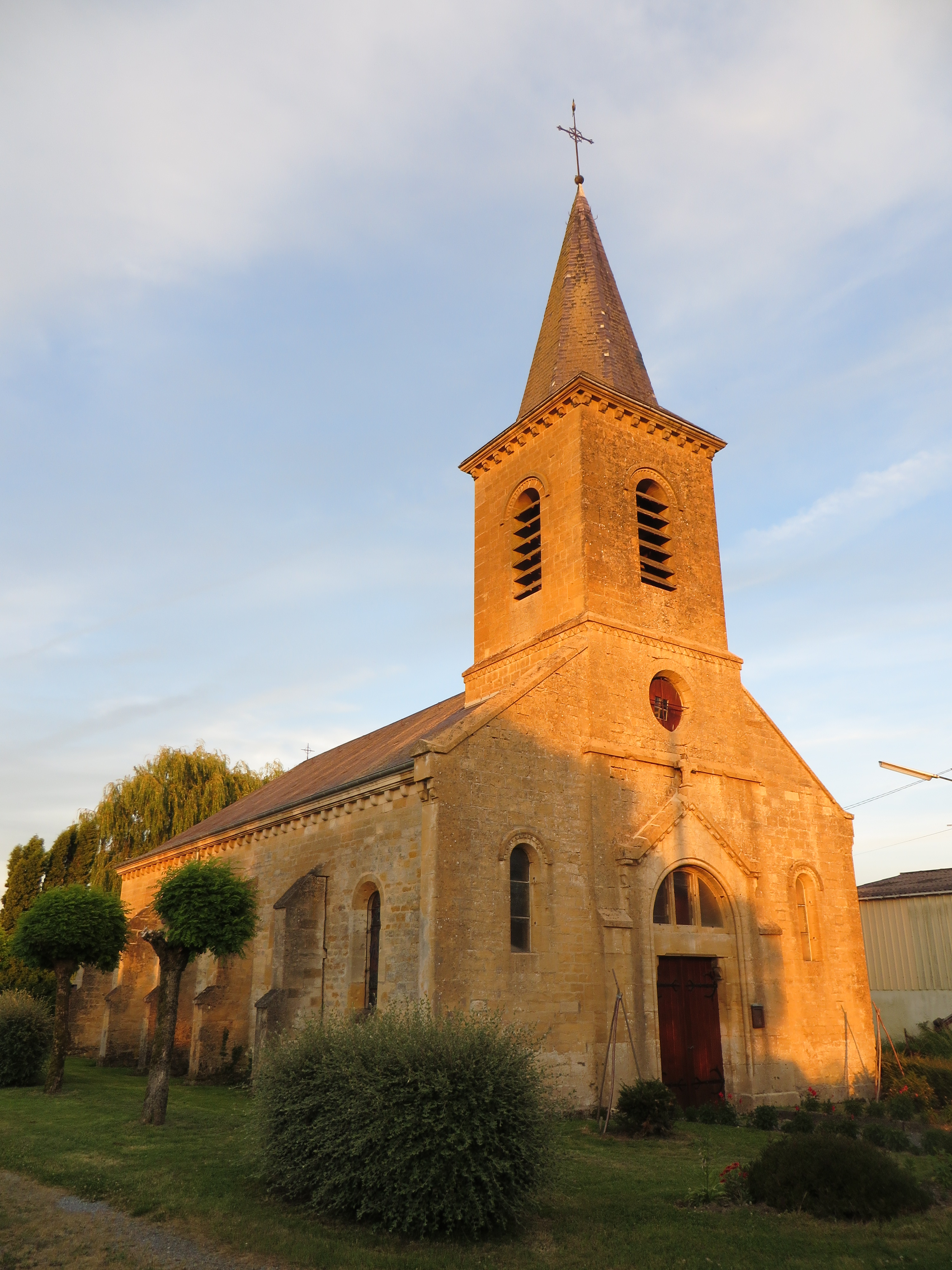
- The church in Saulmory-Villefranche

- Coat of arms
- Location of Saulmory-Villefranche
- Location within France Location within Grand Est
- Coordinates: 49°26′05″N 5°10′38″E
- Country: France
- Region: Grand Est
- Department: Meuse
- Arrondissement: Verdun
- Canton: Stenay
- Intercommunality: Pays de Stenay et Val Dunois

Government
  - Mayor (2020–2026): Claude Ansmant
- Area^{1}: 6.85 km^{2} (2.64 sq mi)
- Elevation: 175 m (574 ft)
- Highest elevation: 200 m (660 ft)
- Lowest elevation: 167 m (548 ft)
- Population (2023): 82
  - Density: 12/km^{2} (31/sq mi)
- Time zone: UTC+01:00 (CET)
  - Summer (DST): UTC+02:00 (CEST)
- INSEE/Postal code: 55471 /55110
- ^{1} French Land Register data, which excludes lakes, ponds, glaciers > 1 km^{2} (0.386 sq mi or 247 acres) and river estuaries.

Saulmory-Villefranche (before 2017: Saulmory-et-Villefranche) is a commune in the Meuse department in Grand Est in north-eastern France.

== See also ==
- Communes of the Meuse department
