= Marie Anne de Bourbon =

Legitimized daughter of Louis XIV (1666–1739)

Marie-Anne de Bourbon
- Princess of Conti; Duchess of La Vallière and Vaujours
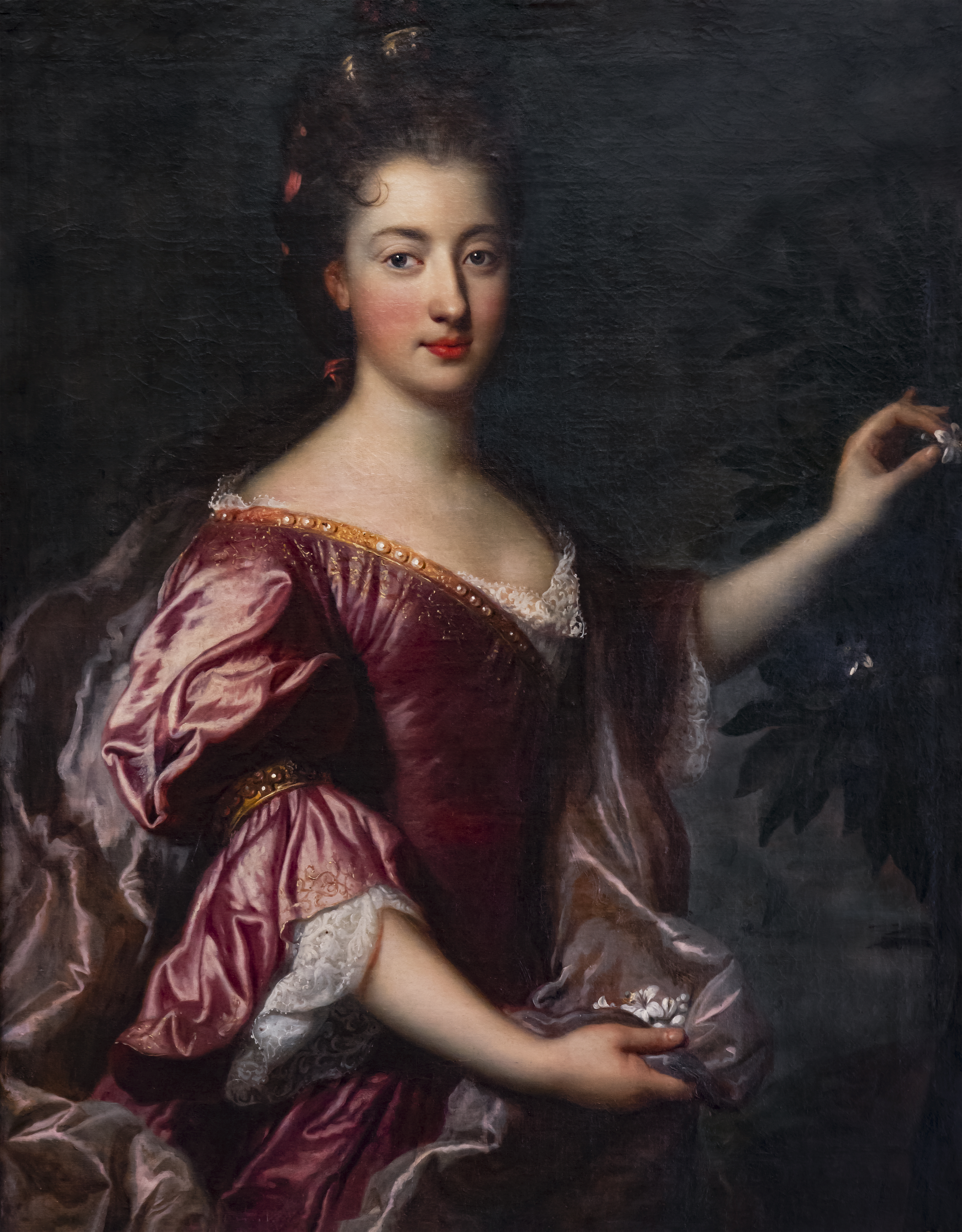
- Portrait by François de Troy, c. 1690
- Born: Marie-Anne de La Blaume Le Blanc de La Vallière; 2 October 1666; Castle of Vincennes, Vincennes, Kingdom of France
- Died: May 3, 1739 (aged 72); Paris, Kingdom of France
- Burial: Saint-Roch, Paris
- Spouse: Louis Armand I, Prince of Conti (m. 1680; died 1685)
- House: Bourbon
- Father: Louis XIV
- Mother: Louise de La Vallière
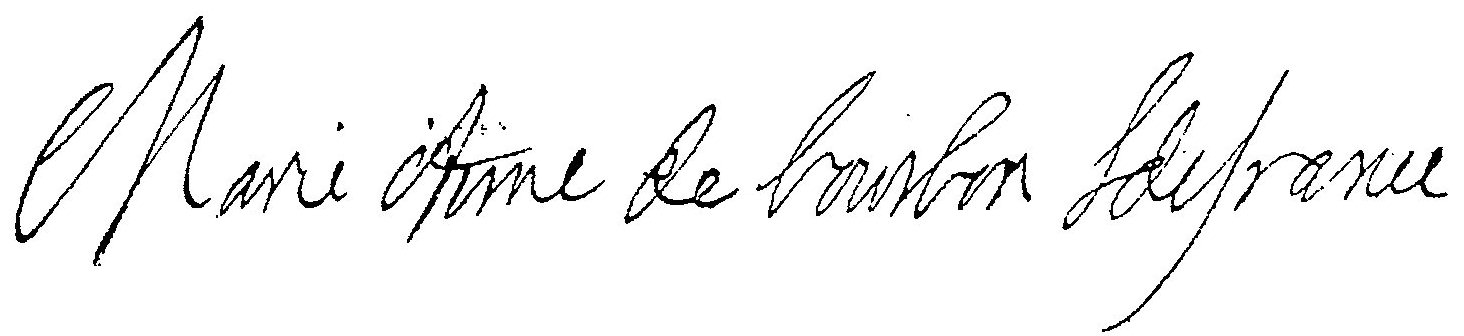
- Signature

Marie Anne de Bourbon, Légitimée de France, born Marie Anne de La Blaume Le Blanc, by her marriage Princess of Conti then Princess Dowager of Conti, suo jure Duchess of La Vallière and of Vaujours (French pronunciation: [maʁi an də buʁbɔ̃]; 2 October 1666 – 3 May 1739) was a French noblewoman as the eldest legitimised daughter of Louis XIV, King of France, born from his mistress Louise de La Vallière, and the king's favourite daughter. She married Louis Armand I, Prince of Conti, in 1680 and was widowed in 1685. She never married again and had no children. Upon her mother's death, she became the suo jure Duchess of La Vallière and of Vaujours.

== Early life (1666–1680) ==
Marie-Anne de La Blaume Le Blanc de la Vallière was born 2 October 1666 in the Castle of Vincennes in secret to an unmarried mother, Louise de La Blaume Le Blanc de La Vallière, Mademoiselle de La Vallière (1644–1710), who had been the mistress of Louis XIV, King of France for about 5 years by then. She had had two full brothers, the eldest of whom, Charles (1663–1665) had already died by the time she was born, while the other, Philippe (1665–1666) died sometime during the year of her birth.

On 14 May 1667, she was legitimised, after which she could use the surname de Bourbon ("of Bourbon"), while her legitimate half-siblings were known as de France ("of France"), and she was created Mademoiselle de Blois. On the same day, her mother was given the titles of Duchess of La Vallière and of Vaujours, which she perceived as a kind of retirement gift and a sign of the end of her relationship with the king. On 2 October 1667, Blois' youngest full sibling, Louis (1667–1683) was born. The two children were placed in the care of Madame Colbert (born Marie Charron), the wife of Chief Minister Jean-Baptiste Colbert (1619–1683).

== Married life (1680–1685) ==
On 16 January 1680, at the age of 13, Blois was married to her distant relative, 18-year-old Louis-Armand I de Bourbon, Prince of Conti (1661–1685), in the chapel of the Castle of Saint-Germain-en-Laye. She was given a dowry of 1 million livres. As Conti was a prince du sang ("Prince of the Blood"), a male member of the House of Bourbon legitimately descended from a sovereign, while Blois was illegitimate, their marriage caused a scandal. This was the first but not the last such marriage, as Louis XIV married many of his illegitimate daughters into the royal family. Even though the prince fell in love with his bride at first sight, their wedding night was disastrous. During its five years, their marriage remained childless, and the princess shocked the royal court by openly stating that her husband was not good at sex. In June 1682, her beloved brother Louis, by then legitimised and created the Count of Vermandois, was exiled for his participation in La Sainte Congregation des Glorieux Pédérastes ("Holy Congregation of Glorious Pederasts"), a secret group of young aristocrats practicing le vice italien ("the Italian vice"), male homosexual sodomy. The following year, on 18 November 1683, he died in disgrace at the age of 16, devastating the princess.

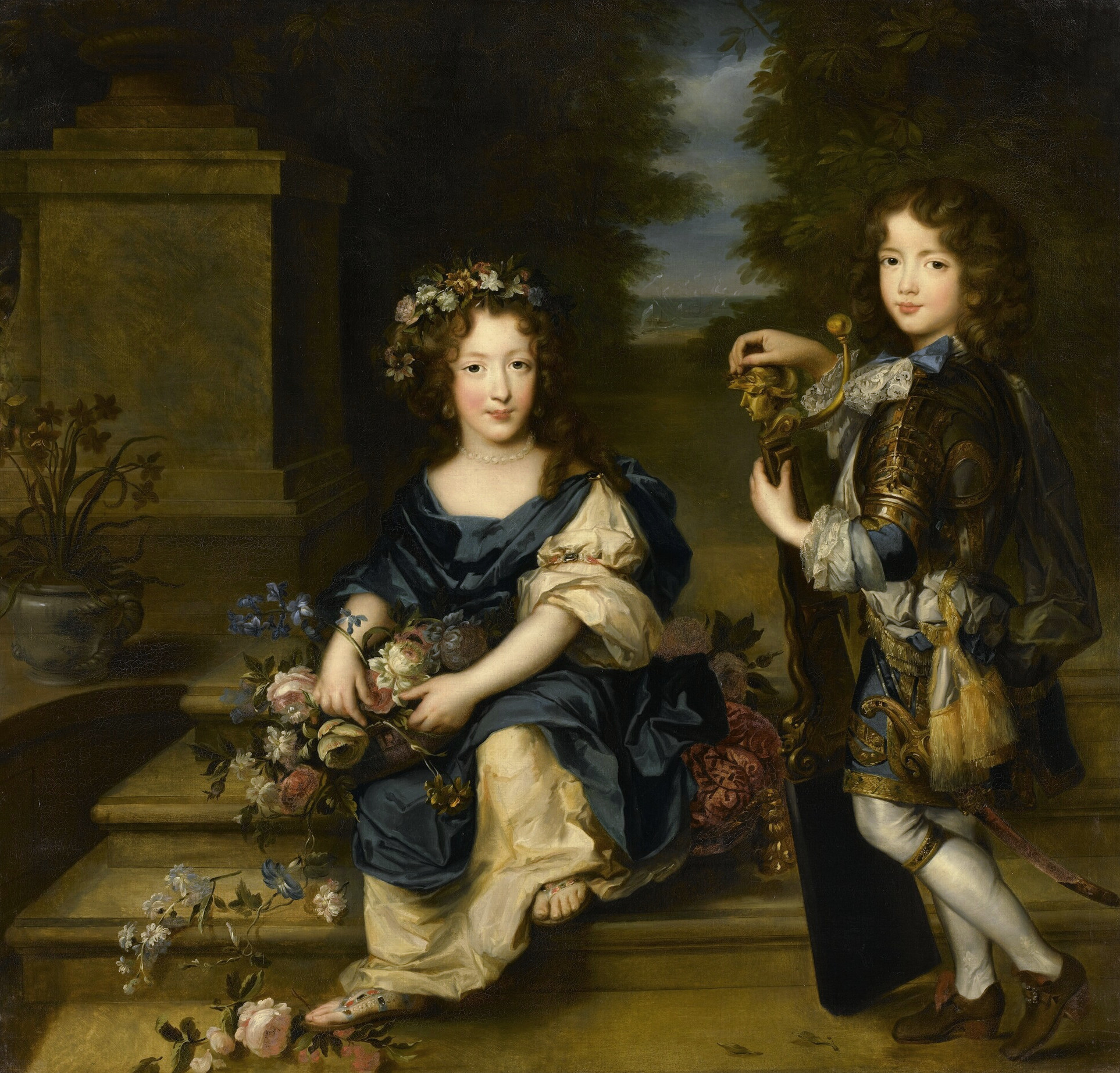
The Mademoiselle de Blois and her brother Louis, Count of Vermandois Louis-Édouard Rioult's copy of a 17th century painting.

For a little over 4 years following her marriage, she was one of the most important ladies at her father's court, outranked only by Queen Maria Theresa, Maria Anna, the Dauphine (from 7 March 1680), Elizabeth Charlotte, Duchess of Orléans and the two daughters of the Duke of Orléans, Princesses Anne-Marie, Madame Royale (until 10 April 1684) and Élisabeth-Charlotte, Mademoiselle de Chartres then Madame Royale. However, in May 1685, her 11-year-old half-sister Louise-Françoise de Bourbon (1673–1743) was married to Louis de Bourbon, Duke of Bourbon (1668–1710). As the groom was the heir to the title of Prince of Condé, and the Bourbon-Conti branch descended from the Bourbon-Condé branch of the royal house, the new duchess outranked the Princess of Conti, leading to tension between the sisters.

In 1685, the Princess of Conti contracted smallpox, which then spread to her husband. While she recovered, he succumbed after 5 days. After his death, she was known as Madame la Princesse Douairière de Conti ("Madam the Dowager Princess of Conti") or la Grande Princesse de Conti ("the Great Princess of Conti").

== Widowed life (1685–1739) ==
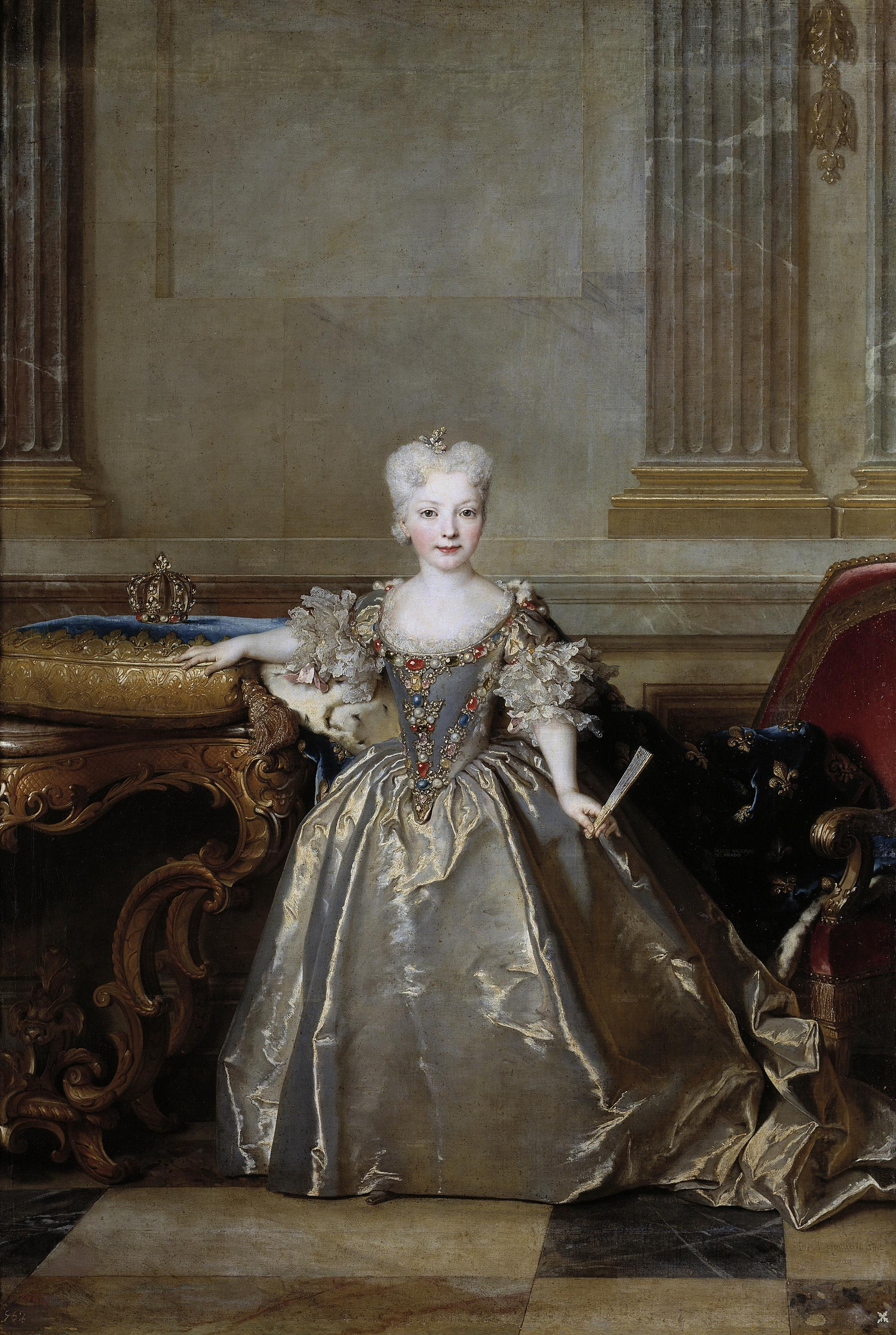
Infanta Mariana Victoria of Spain, the Dowager Princess' grandniece and ward between 1721 and 1725.

The question of rank and precedence always remained central to the dowager princess' life. In February 1692, her half-sister Françoise-Marie de Bourbon (1677–1749), who inherited her maiden title of Mademoiselle de Blois, was married to Philippe, Duke of Chartres (1674–1723), heir to the title of Duke of Orléans. From the day of the wedding, their 15-year-old sister outranked both the 26-year-old dowager and the 19-year-old Duchess of Bourbon. She was given a dowry of 2 million livres, twice the amount that the Princess of Conti and the Duchess of Bourbon had received, as well as the Palais-Royal. The young girl deliberately flaunted her position, much to the annoyance of the two formal rivals, who were from then on openly hostile to their sister.

After the death of Louis XIV on 1 September 1715, leaving his 4-year-old great grandson the throne, a regency was established and the dowager princess' brother-in-law, Philippe II, Duke of Orléans (1674–1723) was appointed regent, de facto ruling the country between 1715 and 1723, a period of French history known as régence. In 1721, the princess was put in charge of the education of Louis XV's 3-year-old fiancée, Infanta Mariana Victoria of Spain (1718–1781), her grandniece. The engagement was called off 4 years later, as an heir to the throne was desperately desired, but the infanta was too young to conceive. She was sent back to Spain in 1725 and later became the Queen (consort) of Portugal. After her departure, the princess dowager retired from court and spent her remaining years mainly in the countryside.

=== Marriage proposals ===
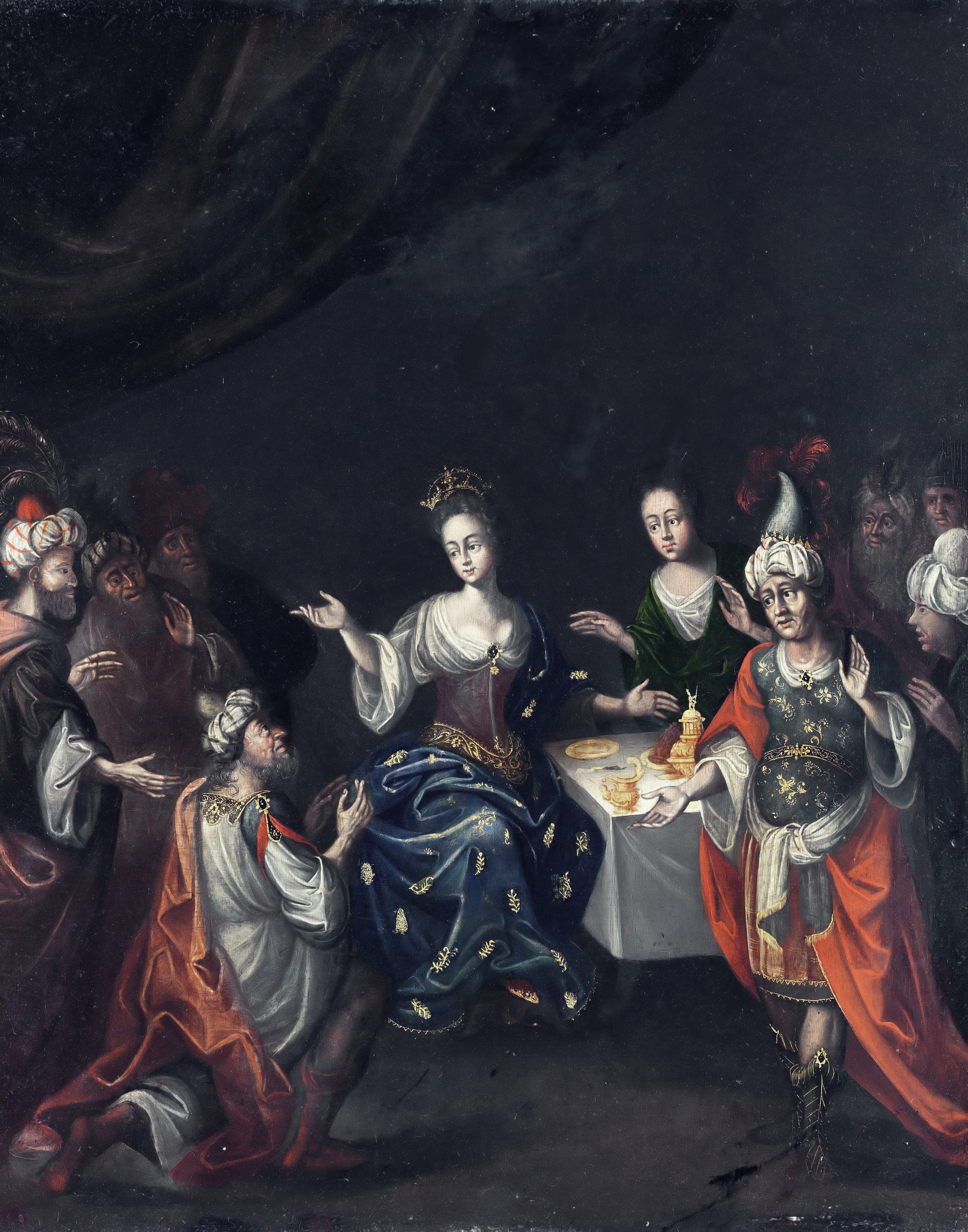
The Dowager Princess of Conti refusing the marriage proposal of the Sultan of Morocco in a contemporary painting.

It is possible that in 1698, the 32-year-old dowager princess, renowned for her beauty, received a marriage proposal from her 15-year-old nephew Philippe, Duke of Anjou (1683–1746), a younger son of her legitimate half-brother Louis, the Grand Dauphin of France (1661–1711), who would later become King of Spain. She also refused a proposal from the Sultan of Morocco, Ismail Ibn Sharif (circa 1645–1727), preferring her freedom as a widow.

=== The three Princesses Dowager of Conti ===
In 1709, the heir of her late husband, François-Louis, Prince of Conti (1664–1709) died, leaving a second dowager princess of Conti, born Marie-Thérèse de Bourbon, Mademoiselle de Bourbon (1666–1732). From then on, they were known Madame la Princesse de Conti Première Douairière ("Madam the Princess of Conti First Dowager") and Madame la Princesse de Conti Seconde (until 1727)/Douxième (from 1727) Douairière ("Madam the Princess of Conti Second Dowager"). In 1713, the first dowager helped to secure the marriage of her late husband's nephew, Louis-Armand II Prince of Conti and her half-niece, Louise Élisabeth de Bourbon, Mademoiselle de Charolais (1693–1775), who became Madame La Princesse de Conti Troisième/Dernière Douairière (Madam the Princess of Conti Third/Last Dowager) in 1727, upon her husband's death.

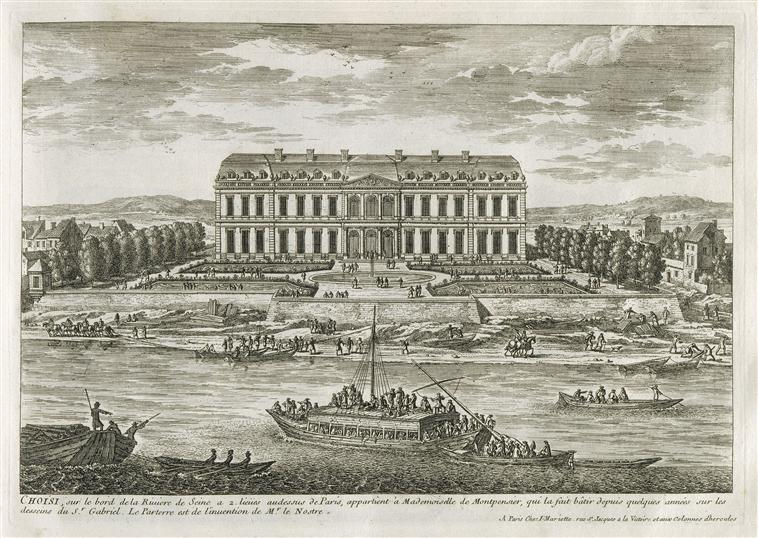
The Castle of Choisy in the second half of the 17th century.

=== Houses ===
In 1710, the princess' mother, who had lived as a Carmelite nun in a Paris convent, died, leaving to her the substantial fortune she had acquired as a royal mistress, as well as her titles of Duchess of La Vallière and of Vaujours (duchesse de La Vallière et de Vaujours). In 1713, she bought the Hôtel de Lorges on Saint Augustin Street (rue Saint-Augustin) in Paris, where she lived from 1715. In 1716, she also bought the Castle of Choisy, and in 1718, she was given the Castle of Champs-sur-Marne by the new king, her grandnephew Louis XV ("Louis the Beloved"; 1710–1774). She later gave this castle to her nephew and heir, Charles-François de La Blaume Le Blanc to settle some debts.

== Relationship with her family ==
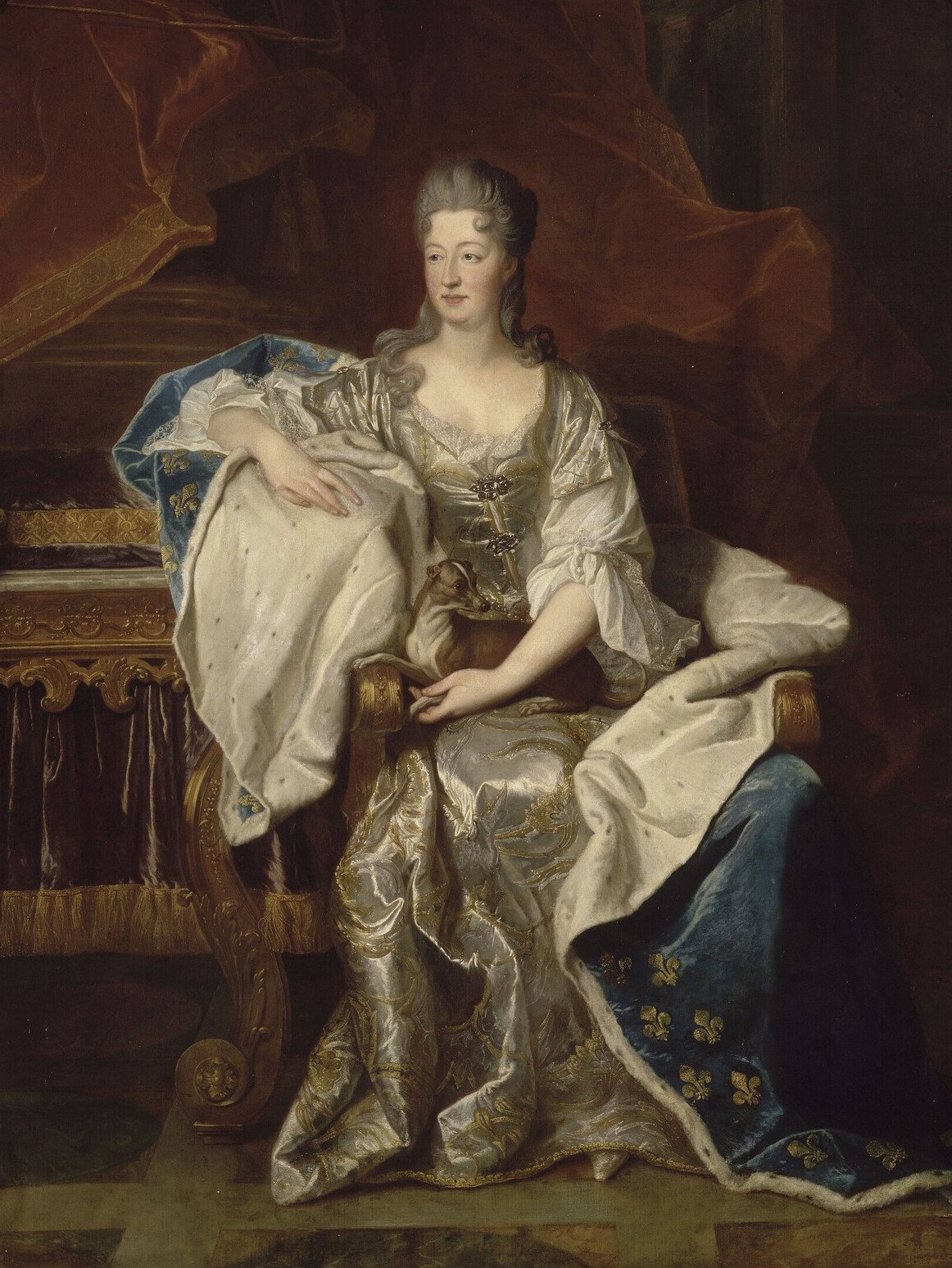
Marie Anne in later life (portrait after an original piece by Hyacinthe Rigaud, 1706)

Both as a child and as an adult, the Princess of Conti had a great relationship with her father, becoming his favourite daughter, while his favourite child overall was her younger half-brother, Louis-Auguste, Duke of Maine (1670–1736). She was also close with her only full brother, Louis, Count of Vermandois (1667–1683), whose early death in 1683 at the age of 16 devastated her. She had a strained relantionship with her half-sisters who outranked her after their marriage (Louise-Françoise, Duchess of Bourbon/Princess of Condé, (1673–1743) and Françoise-Marie, Duchess of Anjou/of Orléans).

With her only legitimate half-sibling, Louis, Grand Dauphin (1661–1711), she had a close relationship, and often visited him at his country estate, the Castle of Meudon. There, she met the Knight of Clermont-Chaste, a young and poor aristocrat, and fell in love with him. The knight was hoping to take advantage of his position, but Louis XIV learned of the romance, he exiled him. It is possible that the king learned of the affair through his daughter-in-law, born Émilie de Joly de Choin, Mademoiselle de Choin (1670–1732), who had been introduced to the grand dauphin by the Princess of Conti. Mademoiselle de Choin was the princess' maid of honour.

The princess seems to have disliked the grand dauphin's first wife, born Maria Anna of Bavaria (1660–1690). Once, when the princess dowager saw her sleeping, she commented that the Dauphine was "as ugly asleep as she was awake". Awakened, the Dauphine replied that she did not "have the advantage of being a love child". After the dauphine's death in 1690, her widower secretly married Mademoiselle de Choin. The princess dowager mourned his death in 1711 deeply.

The Princess Dowager of Conti died of a brain tumor on 3 May 1739 in Paris. She was buried in the Chapel of Our Lady in the Saint-Roch Church (Église Saint-Roch) in Paris. Her titles and fortune were inherited by her nephew, Charles-François de La Baume Le Blanc, and then by his son, famous bibliophile Lous-César de La Baume Le Blanc (1708–1780).

Marie Anne de Bourbon House of Bourbon Cadet branch of the Capetian dynasty Born: 2 October 1666 Died: 3 May 1739
French nobility
Preceded by N/A	Mademoiselle de Blois; 1681–1692	Succeeded by Françoise-Marie de Bourbon
Preceded by Louis Joseph de Bourbon, Duke of Vendôme	Duchess of Penthièvre; 1696–1697	Succeeded by Louis Alexandre de Bourbon, Count of Toulouse
Preceded by Louis Joseph de Bourbon, Duke of Vendôme	Duchess of Étampes; 1712–1718	Succeeded by Louise Élisabeth de Bourbon
Preceded by Louise de La Vallière	Duchess of La Vallière; 1680–1698	Succeeded by Charles François de La Baume Le Blanc firstly AS marquis de La Vallière
Preceded by Anne Marie Martinozzi	Princess of Conti; 1680–1739	Succeeded by Marie Thérèse de Bourbon
