= Françoise Pitel =

French actress

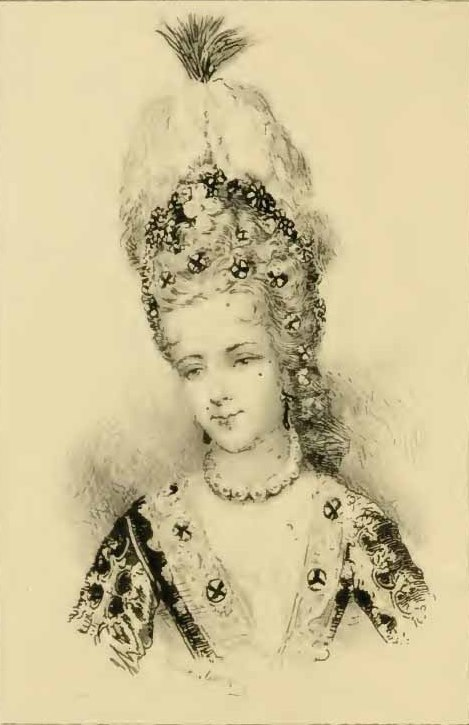
Françoise Pitel

Françoise "Fanchon" Pitel de Longchamp (17 January 1662 – 30 September 1721) was a French actress, professionally known by her stage name Mademoiselle Raisin. She retired from the theater in 1701 and became a mistress of Louis, le Grand Dauphin, by whom she had three daughters.

She was born on 17 January 1662 in Grenoble, Dauphiné to Henri Pitel de Longchamp and Charlotte Legrand. Her father, mother, maternal grandfather, sister (Anne) and brother-in-law were all actors. Her uncle Jean Patin (1635-1709), also an actor, was married to Jeanne Beauval, an actress who was famous for her contagious laughter.

Françoise Pitel was engaged in 1679 at the Royal theater company of Hôtel de Bourgogne (theatre), and became a pioneer member of the Comédie-Française in 1680. She belonged to the star attractions of the theatre and successfully performed roles as heroine ingenues in comedies and princesses in tragedies.

On 27 November 1679 she married the talented French actor Jean-Baptiste Raisin (born 1656 in Troyes, died 1693). Over the course of their fourteen-year marriage, she had eight children with him.

As a widow she became a mistress of Louis de Bourbon, Dauphin of France and had three daughters by him:

- Mlle de Fleury, born in Meudon, died young.
- Anne-Louise, Mlle de Fleury, later Mme d'Avaugour (1695 – August 1716), married Anne Errard, marquis d'Avaugour.
- Charlotte, Mlle de Fleury, later Mme de La Jonchère (6 February 1697 – 1750), married Gérard Michel de La Jonchère.

In 1701, she was persuaded to retire from the stage to become full time mistress of the Dauphin. When he died in 1711, she lived comfortably on a pension.

She died on 30 September 1721 in Vignats.
