= De Nicolay family =

Old European noble family

de Nicolay
- Current region: France and former colonies, United Kingdom and former colonies, Germany, Russia, United States, Australia, India, Canada and South Africa.
- Origin: France

The de Nicolay family (de Nicolaÿ/Nicolaï) – refer to Nobility particle – is an old European noble family of the Ancien Régime with its roots in Southern France at the early part of the 14th Century. There is however, evidence to suggest that its origins stretch further back to the growth of the city state of Florence at the beginning of the Florentine Renaissance. The Nicolay family was originally associated with the French noble classes of the Nobles of the Robe and the Nobles of the Sword. It is well documented that members of the House of Nicolay became highly influential in the spheres of national government, law, the church, academia, military and diplomatic service, as well as the arts. They held the titles of marquis, count and baron.

== Origins ==
The earliest known reference to the family de Nicolay begins with Guy (also known as Guglielmo) who was born close to Florence, Italy and accompanied Pope Clement V in around 1305, when the Papacy was first established in Poitiers. His son, Guy (II) (who had married Jaqueline de Baroncelli) followed his father to France and settled in the town of Bourg-Saint-Andéol in the province of Vivarais (now the Ardèche). Guy & Jaqueline de Nicolay had a son, who they named Ahoult. Ahoult grew to be an influential and accomplished man; exerting the role of Lieutenant of the Bailiff of the King in Vivarais. He married Jeanne de Barjac. Their son was Guy III who married Antoinette de Casteljau who bore two sons; Jean and Raymond. Jean de Nicolay (named the first in the will of his father) became the author of the branch of the House of Nicolay referred to as the Marquis de Goussainville and Raymond de Nicolay became the author of the branch of the Baronnie de Sabran.

== The House of Nicolay in France ==
The growth of the House of Nicolay over the centuries meant that many members rose to positions of national responsibility, including Chancellor to the Kingdom of Naples (1502), Count Antoine de Nicolaï who became Marshal of France in 1775, a General Lieutenant of the Grand Master of Artillery (under the reign of King Louis XIII) several Generals, several Colonels of the Regiment of Nicolay Dragoons, four Bishops, a Vice-Legate of Avignon, Cahors, Béziers and Verdun; this last at the same time as a member of the family was made First Chaplain to Duchess Marie-Josèphe of Saxony, mother of King Louis XVI. In addition, the family produced several Knights of Malta and Saint-Louis, the First President of the Grand Council, a Member of The French Academy, a Chancellor of the Orders of the King (1789) and the first nine Presidents of the Chamber of Accounts, which from 1506 until 1794, followed one another without interruption.

By Letters Patent of 1645, Anne of Austria, wanting to reward the services rendered by several generations of the House of Nicolay, set the grounds of Goussainville in Marquisat in favour of Antoine de Nicolay and his descendants. Towards the end of the fifteenth century, the House of Nicolay was divided into two branches, the first known as the Barons De Sabran, established in Ardèche and the other, The Marquis de Goussainville, in the Île-de-France. On 19 May 1815 King Louis XVIII called the House of Nicolay to hereditary peerage in the name of Aymard-Charles-Marie-Theodore Marquis De Nicolay.

Other notable members of the family included Nicolas de Nicolay, Aimar-Charles-Marie de Nicolaï, Count François de Nicolay. Nicolas de Nicolay served for a time as Geographer-in-Ordinary to Henry II of France and spent most of his adult life traveling throughout Europe and the Turkish Empire. In 1568, Nicolay published an account of his travels under the title, 'Quatre Premiers Livres des Navigations. The work appeared in several editions including an Italian translation by Francesco Flori published in 1577.

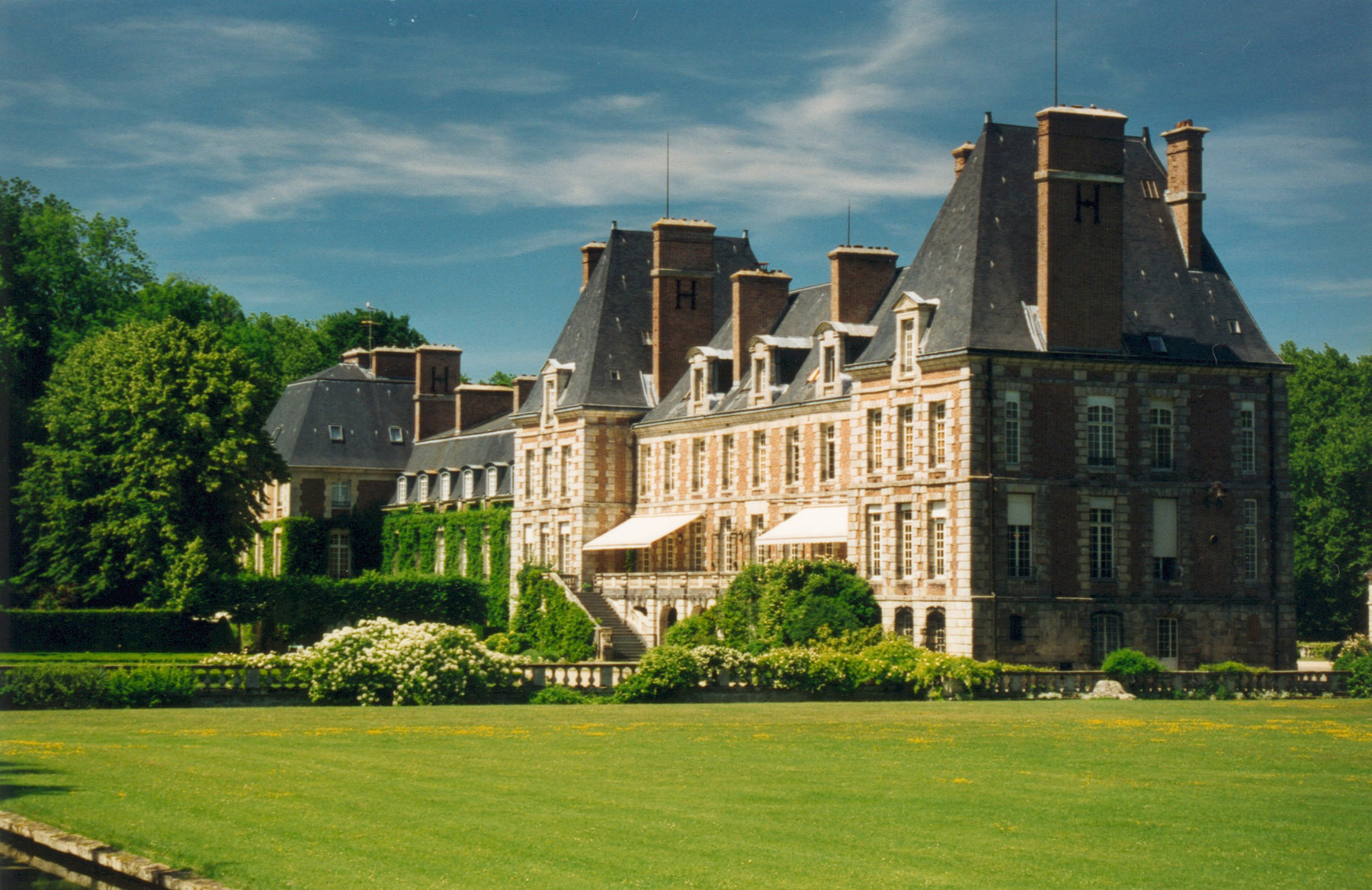
Château de Courances. Home of Marquis Aymard de Nicolay and his family from 1775 to 1830.

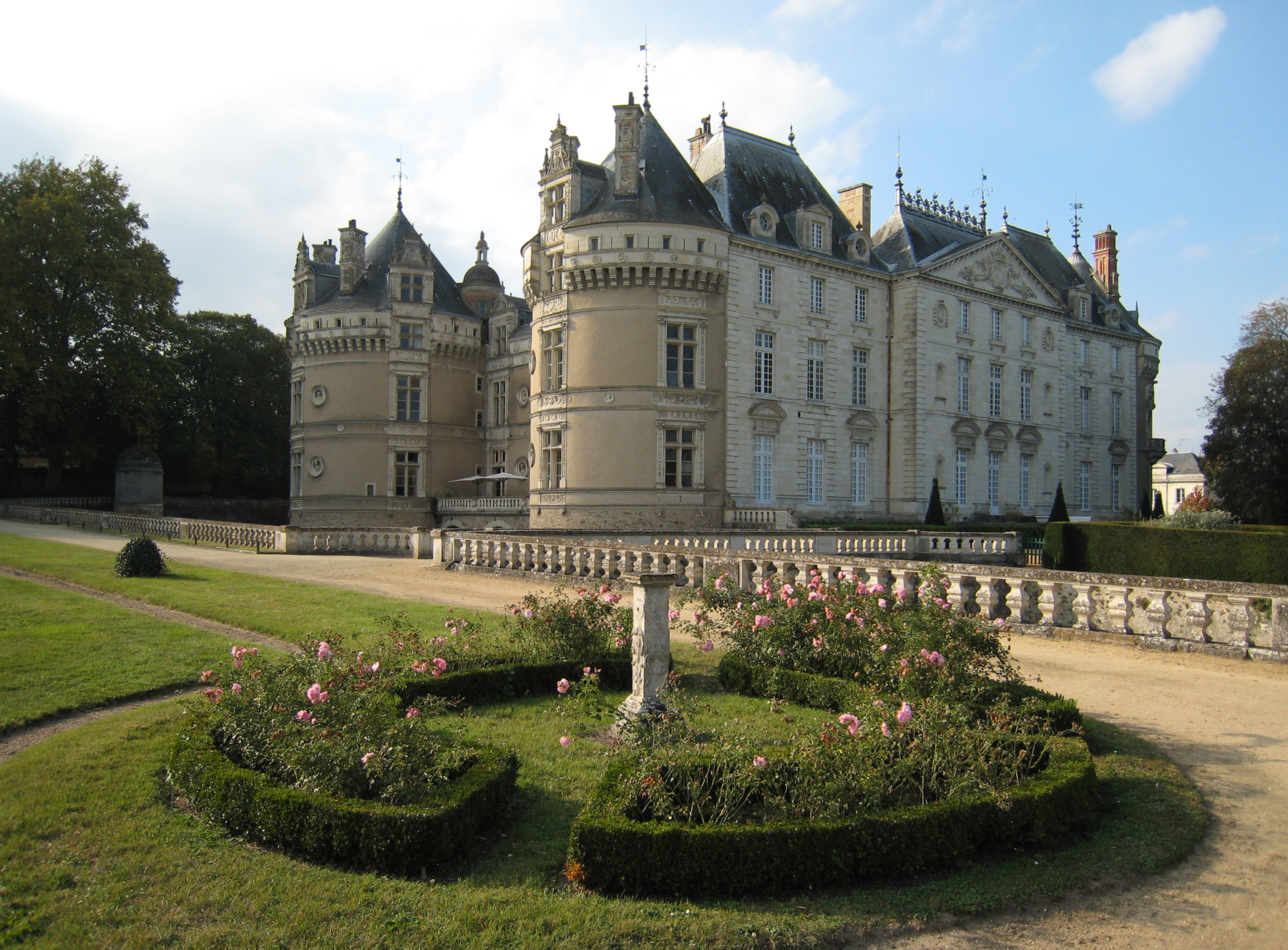
Chateau du Lude. Home of Count and Countess Louis-Jean de Nicolaÿ

== The House of Nicolay in England ==
Gaspard de Nicolay (recorded as Caspar Nicolay in record of death) was a member of the Court of Frederick III, Duke of Saxe-Gotha-Altenburg. He, his wife Joanna Sapphira and their two sons arrived in England from the Duchy of Saxe-Gotha-Altenburg (now in the area of Thuringia, Germany) in 1736. Gaspard was Attendant and Page to Princess Augusta of Saxe-Gotha and the Nicolay family accompanied her to London, where she was to marry Frederick, Prince of Wales. Gaspard became Page of the Presence to Princess Augusta and Prince Frederick from 1736 until 1751 and then Page of the Backstairs from 1751 until 1772. Gaspard and Sapphira's two sons were Frederick de Nicolay (the elder) and Christian Frederick de Nicolay (the younger).

Elder Branch

Frederick was introduced to King George III, with whom he became a very great favourite; so much so that when his affianced bride Princess Charlotte of Mecklenburg-Strelitz was to be married to the King, the King sent Frederick de Nicolay to attend his future Queen. He remained ever after the confidential friend of the king and queen, as well as of their family, the Princes and Princesses and lived in St James's Palace. The affection which the King and Queen held for Frederick was demonstrated in his appointments as a violinist in the Queen's Chamber Band, keeper of the Queen's Music Library and the Queen's Principal Page. Frederick married Albinia Lattman and had 13 children, only three of whom lived to maturity. He died at St James's Palace on 16 May 1809

Frederick's three sons were: George Louisa, named after Christian VII of Denmark and Caroline Matilda of Great Britain who were his sponsors; Frederick; and William. Reverend George Louisa Nicolay became Rector of St Michael Paternoster Royal in the City of London and Chaplain to Prince Frederick, Duke of York and Albany Frederick became Chief Clerk to the British Treasury. Frederick's 6th child was Charles Grenfell Nicolay, a clergyman, geographer and geologist and (with F. D. Maurice) founder of Queen's College, London, the first institution for higher education of women in England.

Lieutenant-General Sir William Nicolay K.C.H., C.B. (B.1771) became a distinguished army officer in the Royal Artillery, Royal Staff Corps, Royal Engineers and the King's German Legion. He was present at a number of significant battles and was decorated for his exemplary command of 5 companies of the Royal Staff Corps at the Battle of Waterloo. Sir William went on to become Governor of St Kitts, Mauritius & Dominica and was made a Knight Commander of the Royal Guelphic Order (KCH). He died at Oriel Lodge, Cheltenham, England on 3 May 1842.

Younger Branch

The younger son of Gaspard de Nicolay, Christian Frederick, was brought up in the medical profession. He was private Physician to the Princess Dowager of Wales, Princess Augusta of Saxe-Gotha, mother of King George III on whom (with Sir Clifton Wintringham and Dr Pringle) he was in constant attendance for two years. They<who? referent unclear> alone were in the room with H.R.H. at her decease. He also attended her son Prince Frederick of Great Britain. Christian married Miss Turner and had three sons and two daughters, of whom only two survived: Augusta Georgiana Louisa Nicolay, God Daughter to King George IV and also sponsored by the then Queen Consort of Prussia Louise of Mecklenburg-Strelitz; and Thomas Frederick Nicolay, who became a Lieutenant-Colonel, Staff Surgeon to His Majesty's Forces and Deputy Inspector of Hospitals. Only Thomas Frederick fathered children: Christian William, Frederick Lewis and Thomas Frederick, all of whom were in the service of the East India Company. Lt-Colonel Sir Frederick Lewis was killed at Ootacamund, India in 1855 while commanding the Neilgherries of the 29th Mechanised Native Infantry. Captain Thomas Frederick of the 1st Madras European Fusiliers married Anne Sophia Hickey, who was a direct descendant of the Royal House of Plantagenet, Counts of Anjou and Kings of England. Thomas Frederick Nicolay was killed in January 1853 at the storming of the Pegu stockade, during the Second Anglo-Burmese War. Thomas Frederick Nicolay Lieutenant Christian William was a member of the 28th Madras Native Infantry (refer to: Madras Army) before being pensioned through Lord Clive's Fund. He died in Brighton in 1848.

== The House of Nicolay in Germany ==
There were many notable members of the German branch of the House of Nicolay, including:

- Philipp Nicolai – Lutheran pastor, poet, and composer
- John George Nicolay (born Johann Georg Nicolai) – Private Secretary to United States President Abraham Lincoln.
- Otto Nicolai – conductor, composer and founder of the Vienna Philharmonic Orchestra.

== See also ==
- Ludwig Heinrich von Nicolay
- Monrepos Park
