= Château de Courances =

Castle in Courances, France

Coordinates: 48.44103°N 2.46912°E

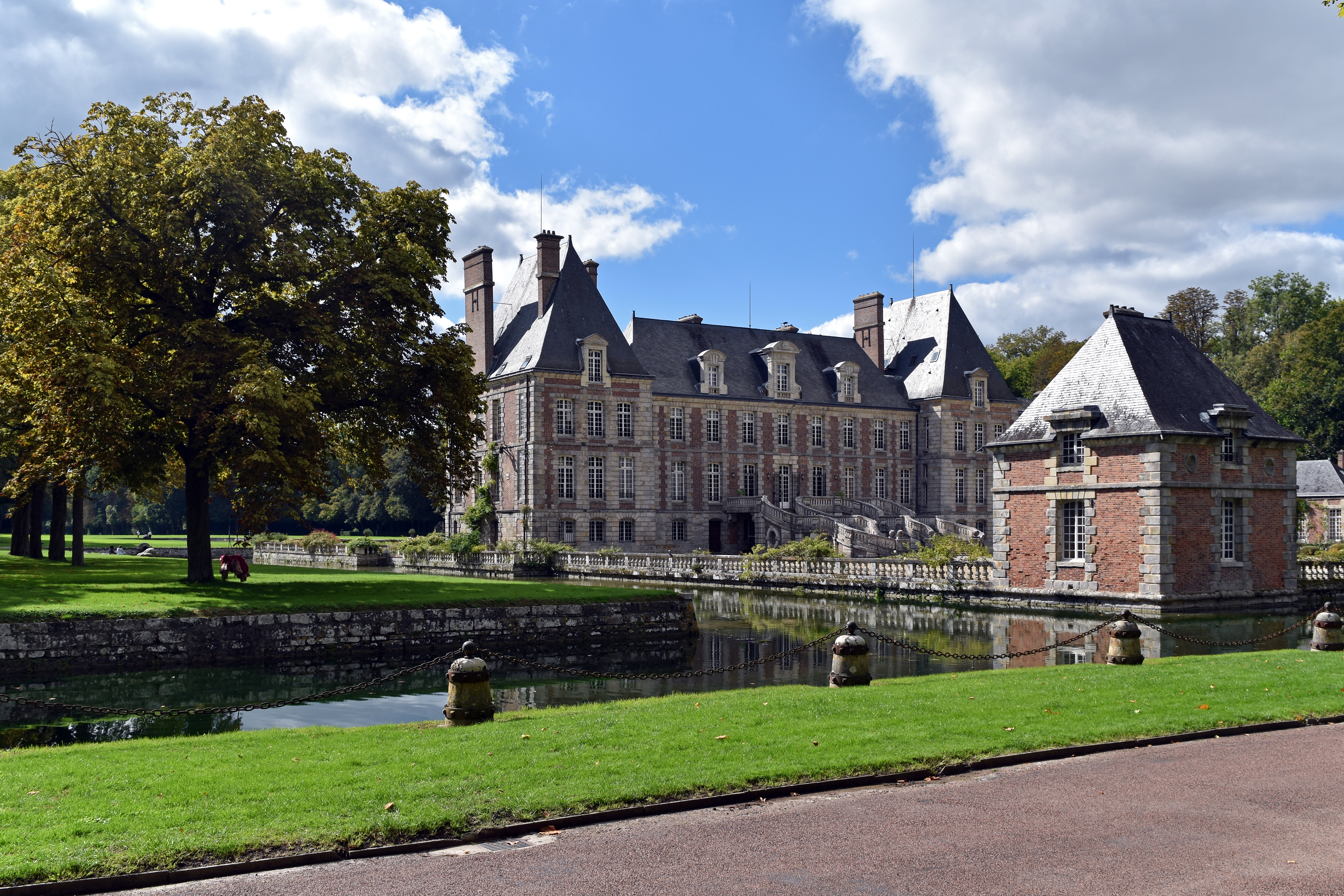
A view of the Château de Courances

The Château de Courances (pronounced [ʃɑto də kuʁɑ̃s]) at Courances, Essonne is a French château built in approximately 1630. The house and gardens are open to the public.

== House ==
In 1552, Côme Clausse, a notary and royal secretary to the King, acquired from the Lapite family the former seigneurial dwelling at Courances, at the western edge of the Forest of Fontainebleau. His heir conveyed it in 1622 to Claude Gallard, another royal secretary, who is doubtless the builder of the present château, of an H-plan laid out on a rectangular platform that is surrounded by a moat.

The original Louis XIII style château is known from the engravings of Israël Henriet and Israël Silvestre, about 1650. The evaluation of the property drawn up in 1638 mentions, apart from the manor house, four barns, a press house, two wheat mills, and two mills "straddling the river". "Above and beyond this is a mill called the fulling mill, with the forecourt of said chateau on one side, and the stream of the pond on the other", it says.

In the 18th century, the house was modernized by Anne-Catherine Gallard, widow of Nicolas Potier de Novion, who opened up a proper cour d'honneur by demolishing the wall and entryway that had enclosed the courtyard. Later her granddaughter Léontine-Philippine de Novion and her husband Aymar de Nicolay further modernized the château (1775–1777) by opening new bays and applying a large pedimented center to each façade. Following the French Revolution the château was abandoned for nearly 40 years, which gave time for a horse chestnut to grow through the floors of the building.

In 1830, the Nicolay heirs (see Nicolay family) conveyed away the château, which was bought in 1872 by German banker Baron Samuel de Haber. Haber and his son-in-law Count Octave de Béhague hired the architect Gabriel-Hippolyte Destailleur to restore the château in a campaign that lasted from 1873 to 1884. Destailleur retrieved the brickwork from beneath a layer of stucco, raised the rooflines of the pavilions and supplied zinc ornaments for the roofs. The grand internal staircase was demolished and monumental ramps of Fontainebleau inspiration were applied to the façades. A new wing with broken roofline was erected over the former kitchens to shelter the master suites, and was linked to the old wing by a gallery.

New outbuildings constructed at the same time were destroyed by fire in 1976.

In the First World War, Courances served as a hospital. In the Second World War, it was first occupied by the Germans, then by Field Marshal Montgomery, serving as Chairman of the Western Union Commanders-in-Chief Committee, from 1947 to 1955.

== Park ==
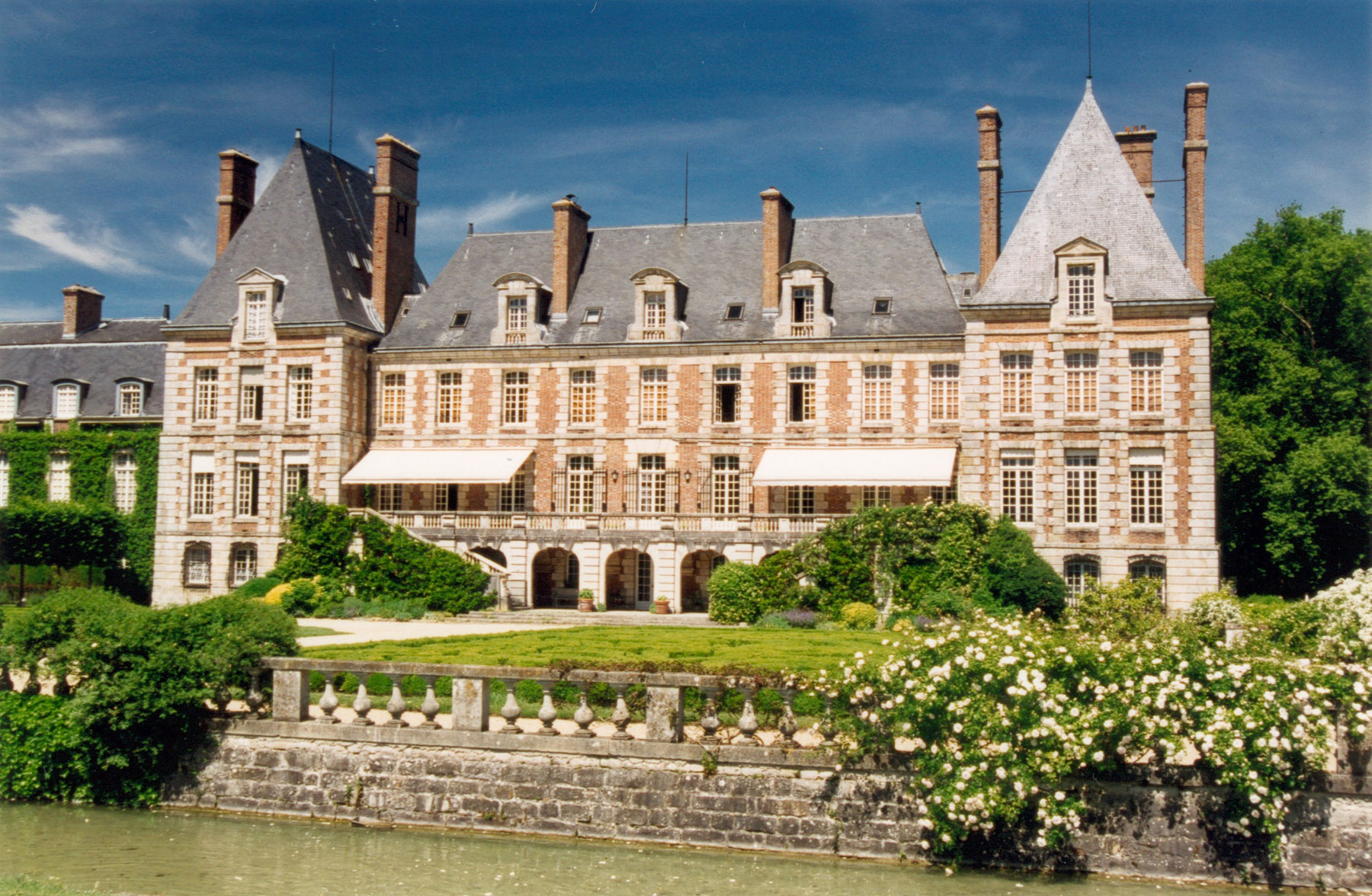
Façade of the château.

Courances has been acclaimed as "the epitome of the French formal garden style in which château and environment form a whole". The garden's traditional attribution to André Le Nôtre is undocumented and dubious. Actually, natural expanses of water at Courances stand in sharp contrast to the fountain machinery employed by Le Nôtre at Versailles and elsewhere. This was noted approvingly by Jacques Dulaure in the 18th century: "Nature has created this effect of ever-flowing water, an effect far superior to those pompous cascades which by mighty effort live for a moment and then die down, as if a painting were to vanish all at once from its frame".

Destailleur in association with his restoration of the château transformed the park to a landscape park à l'anglaise in the 1870s.

By the time that Berthe de Béhague, granddaughter of Baron de Haber and her husband the Marquis Jean de Ganay inherited the property some bones survived of the seventeenth-century garden and it had an entrance avenue of plane trees, the central allée d'honneur between flanking canals and the grand axial perspective centered on the château, with its basins and a grand canal. The Marquise de Novion's eighteenth-century reflecting tank also remained.

The couple hired Achille Duchêne to remake the grounds. Duchêne re-established the French garden by recreating it in novel ways, setting long straight canals in curbs of stone on either side of the central stretch of lawn, and inventing Baroque scrolling designs in clipped box set in panels of gravel. The vista leading south from the house is made to narrow in the distance, giving it an illusion that makes it appear much longer than it actually is. His was also responsible for the fountain of Aréthuse, formerly surmounted by a marble nymph that had been sculpted in 1711 by Claude Poirier for Marly. (The statue was acquired in 2005 by the Musée du Louvre).

In 1908, surprisingly Berthe de Béhague also decided to establish a Japanese hill-and-pond stroll garden to the east of the château and adjacent to a rustic teahouse called La Foulere which used to be an old sawmill. To assist Duchêne with its creation the Marquise employed Kathleen Lloyd Jones, an English protégé of Gertrude Jekyll.

During the Second World War, the grounds fell into disrepair. Jean-Louis de Ganay upon his return from the war to his inheritance used his training in agriculture to begin restoration of the grounds in 1948, with his wife Philippine taking responsibility for the Japanese garden.

== Photo gallery ==
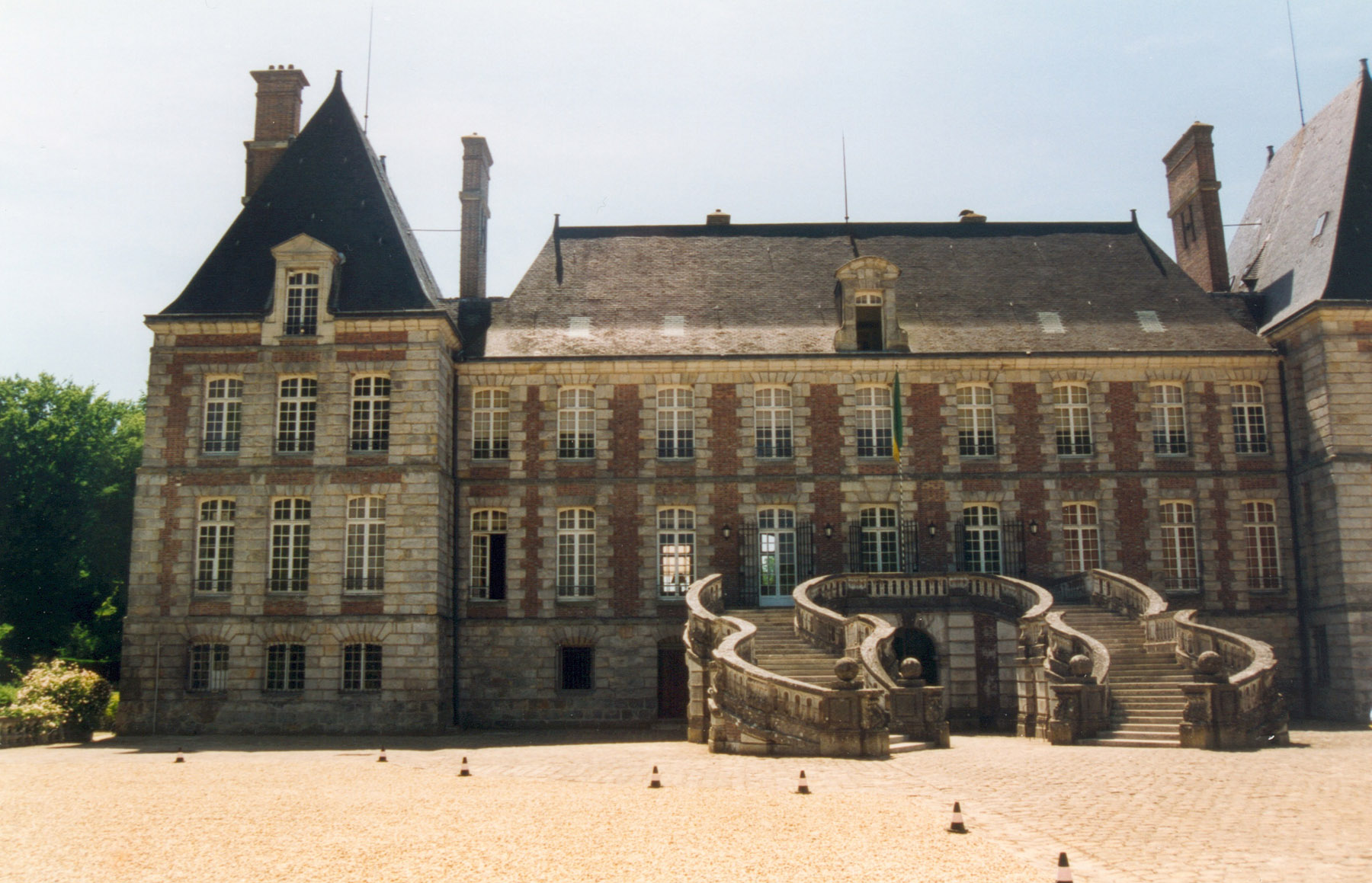
Château de Courances viewed from yard (côté cour).

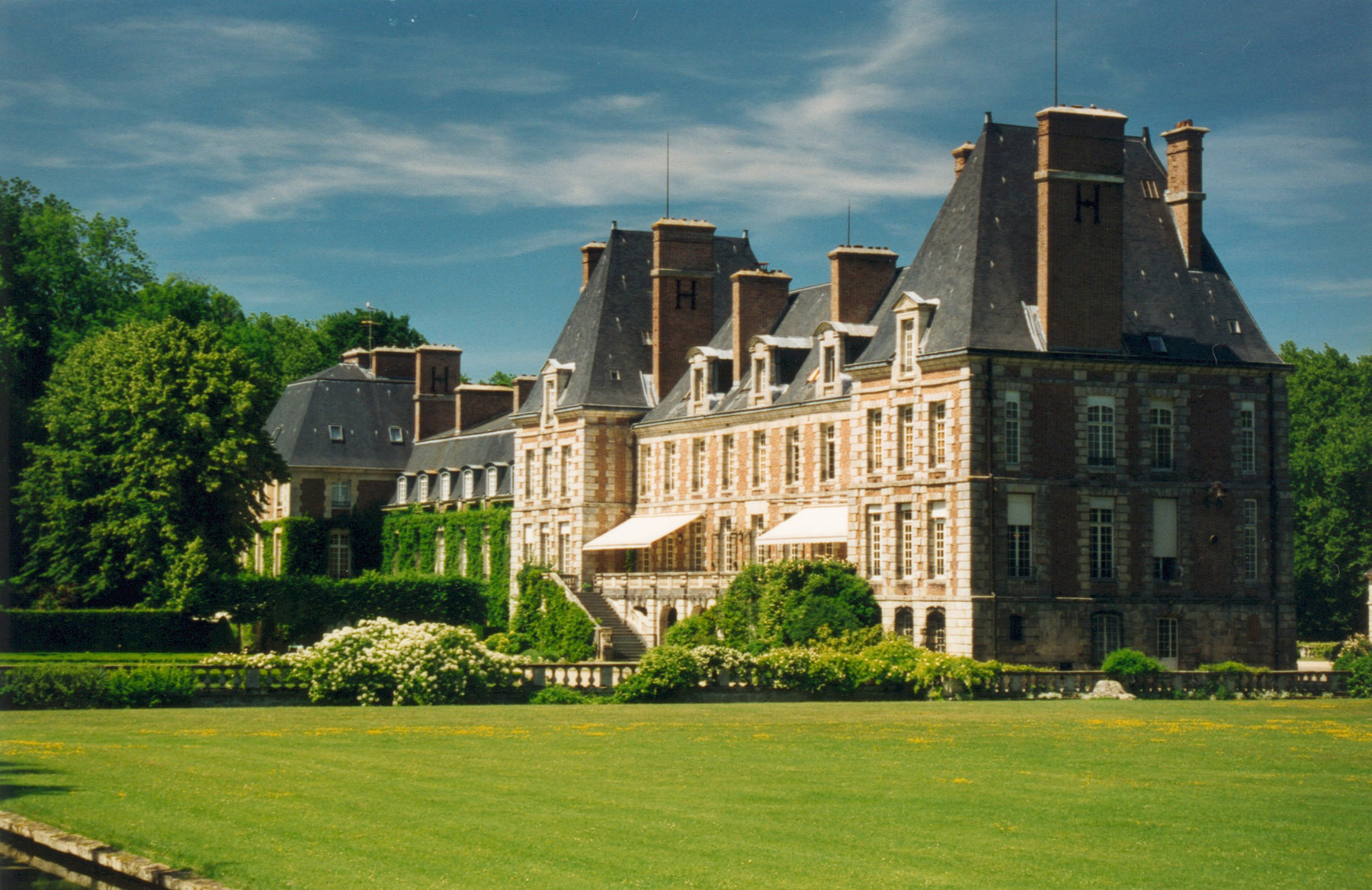
Château de Courances viewed from garden (côté jardin).

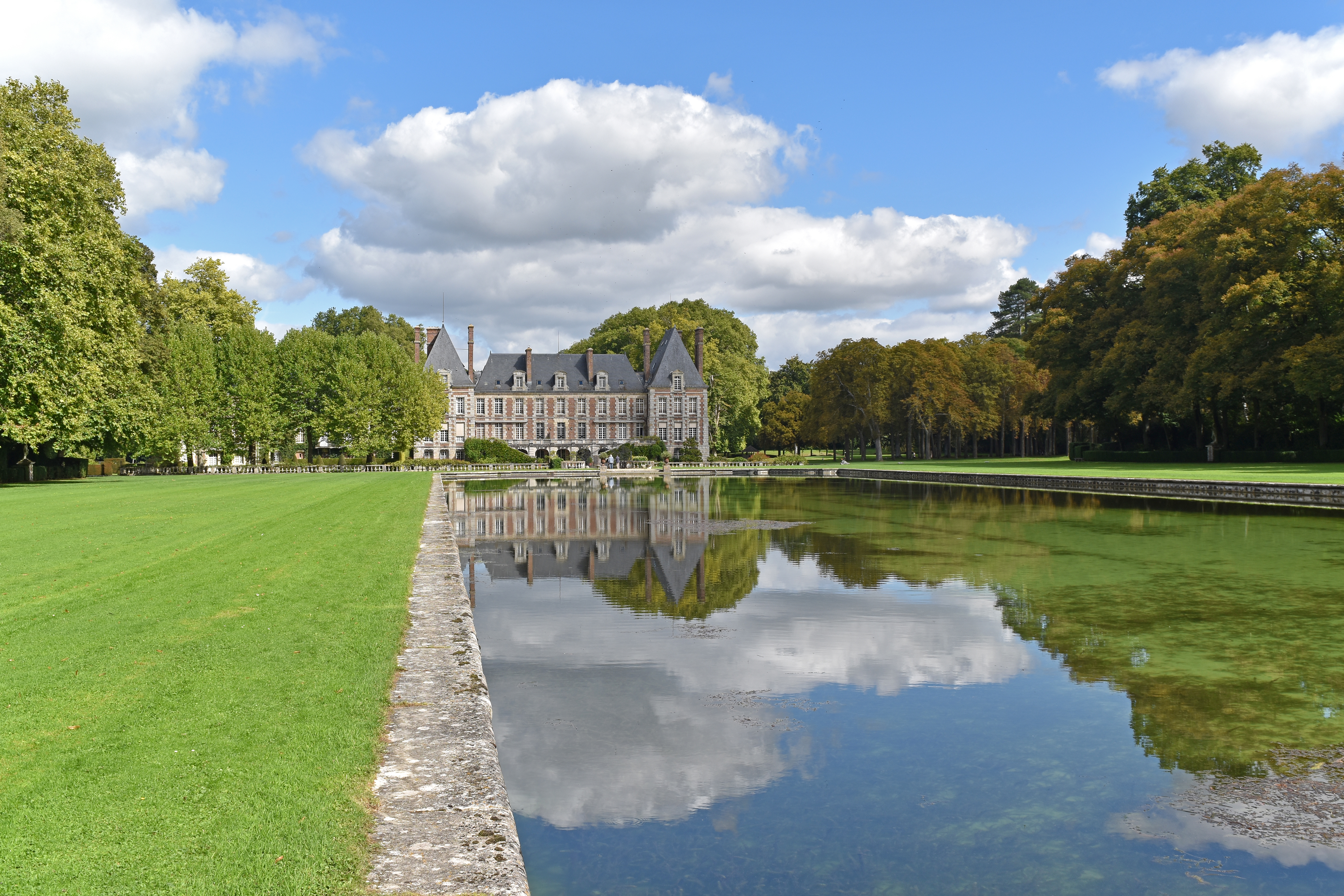
The pond in front of the Château de Courances.

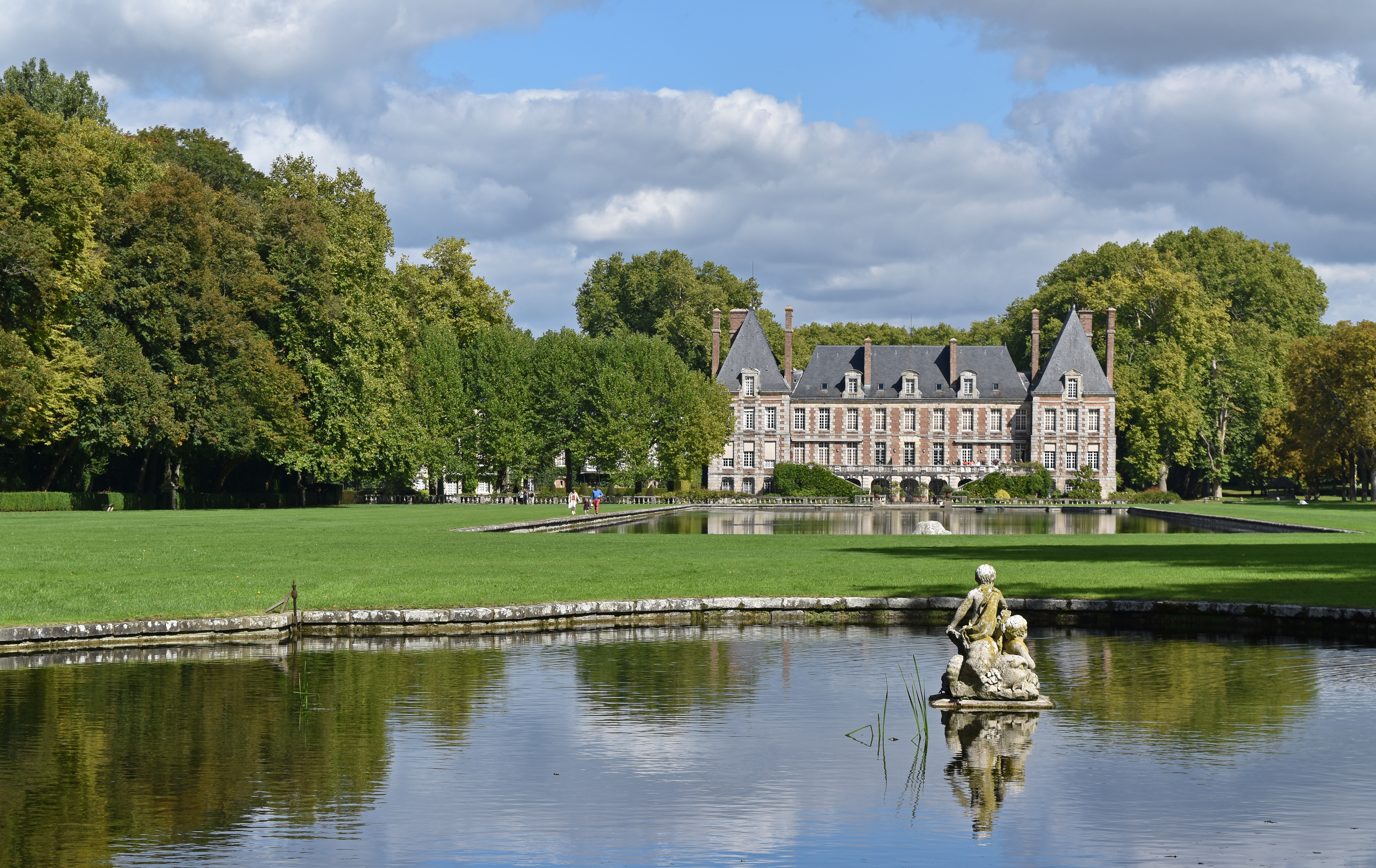
Two ponds in front of the Château de Courances.

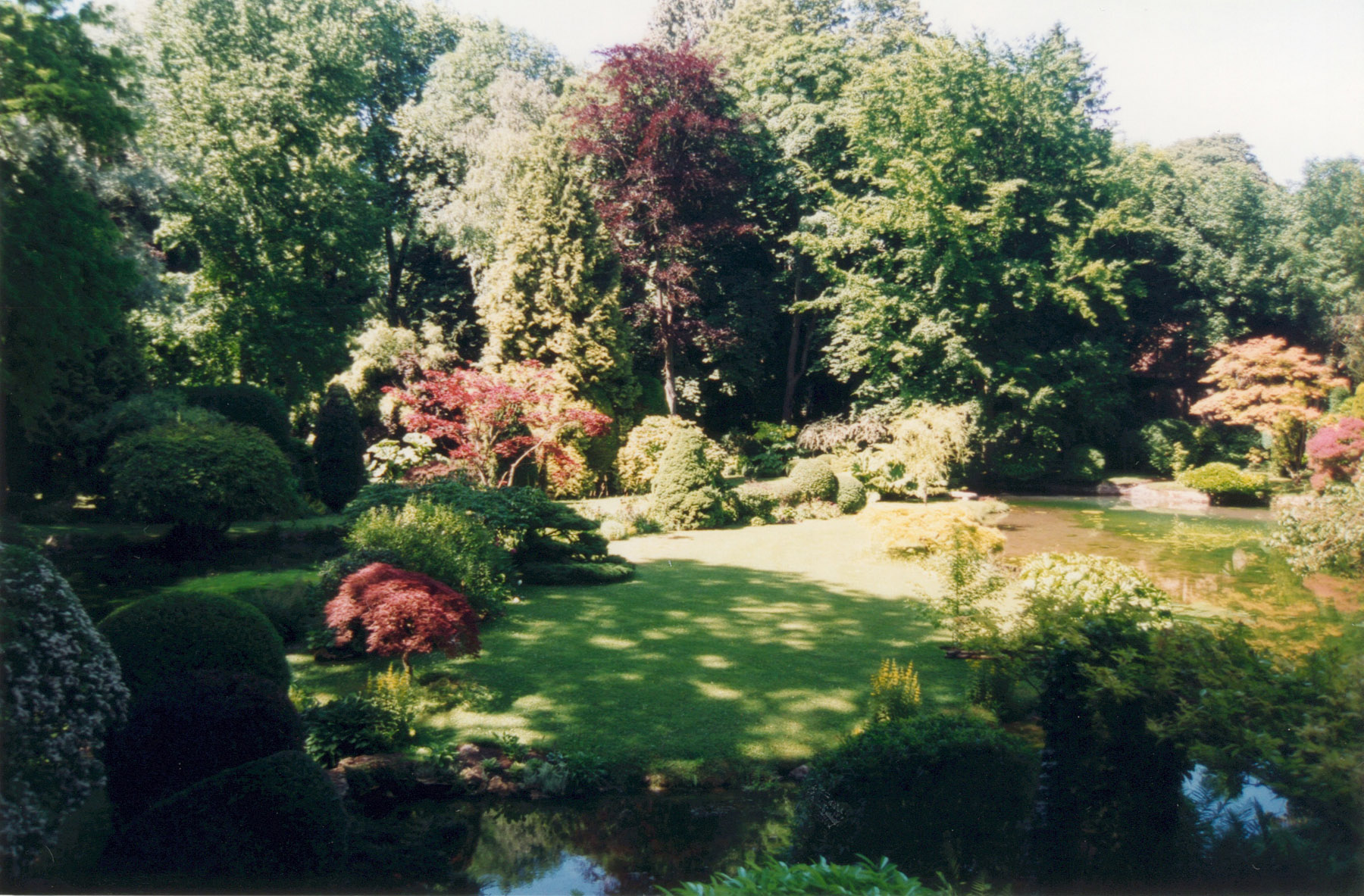
The Japanese garden.

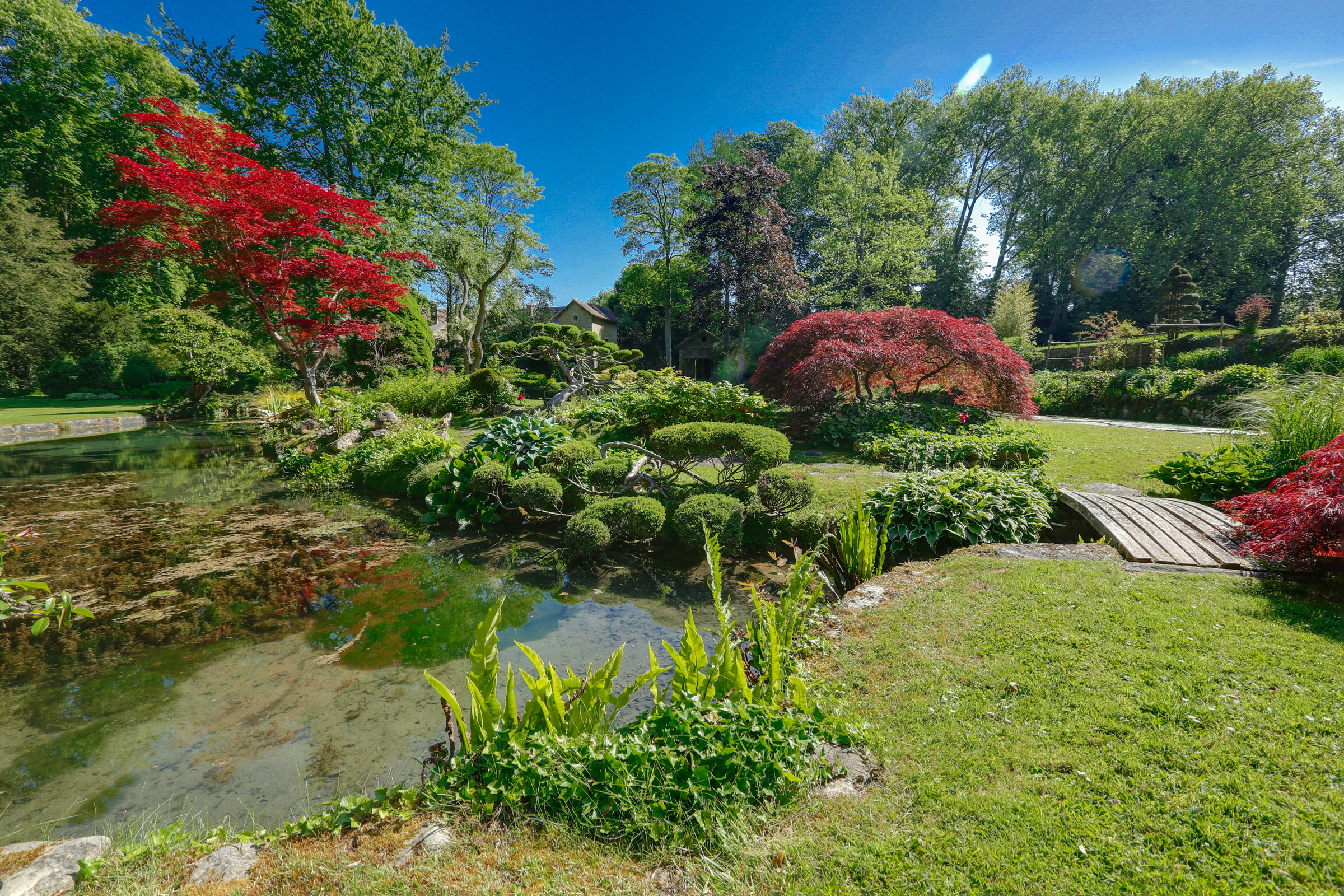
Another view of the Japanese garden.

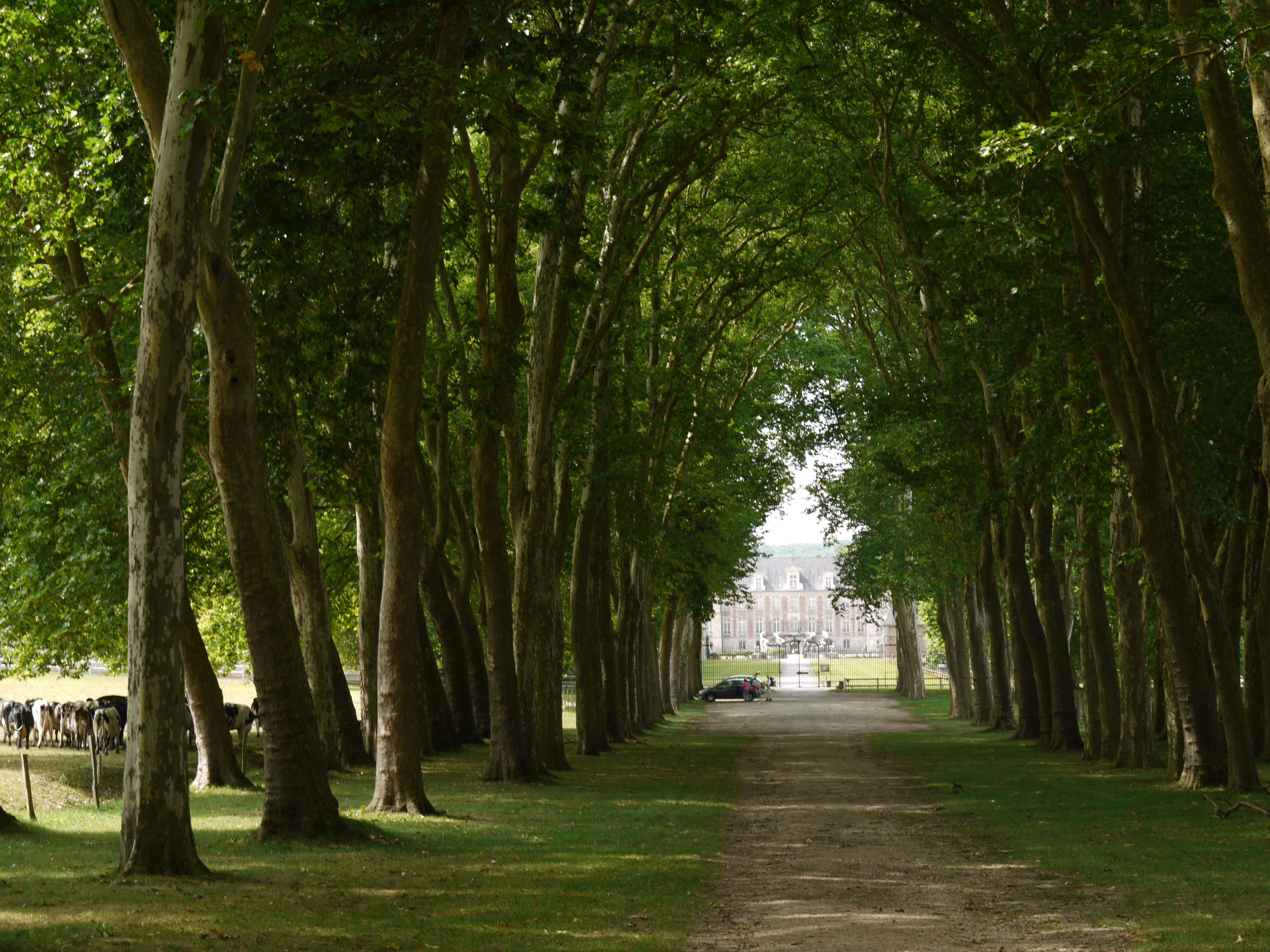
Allée to the castle.

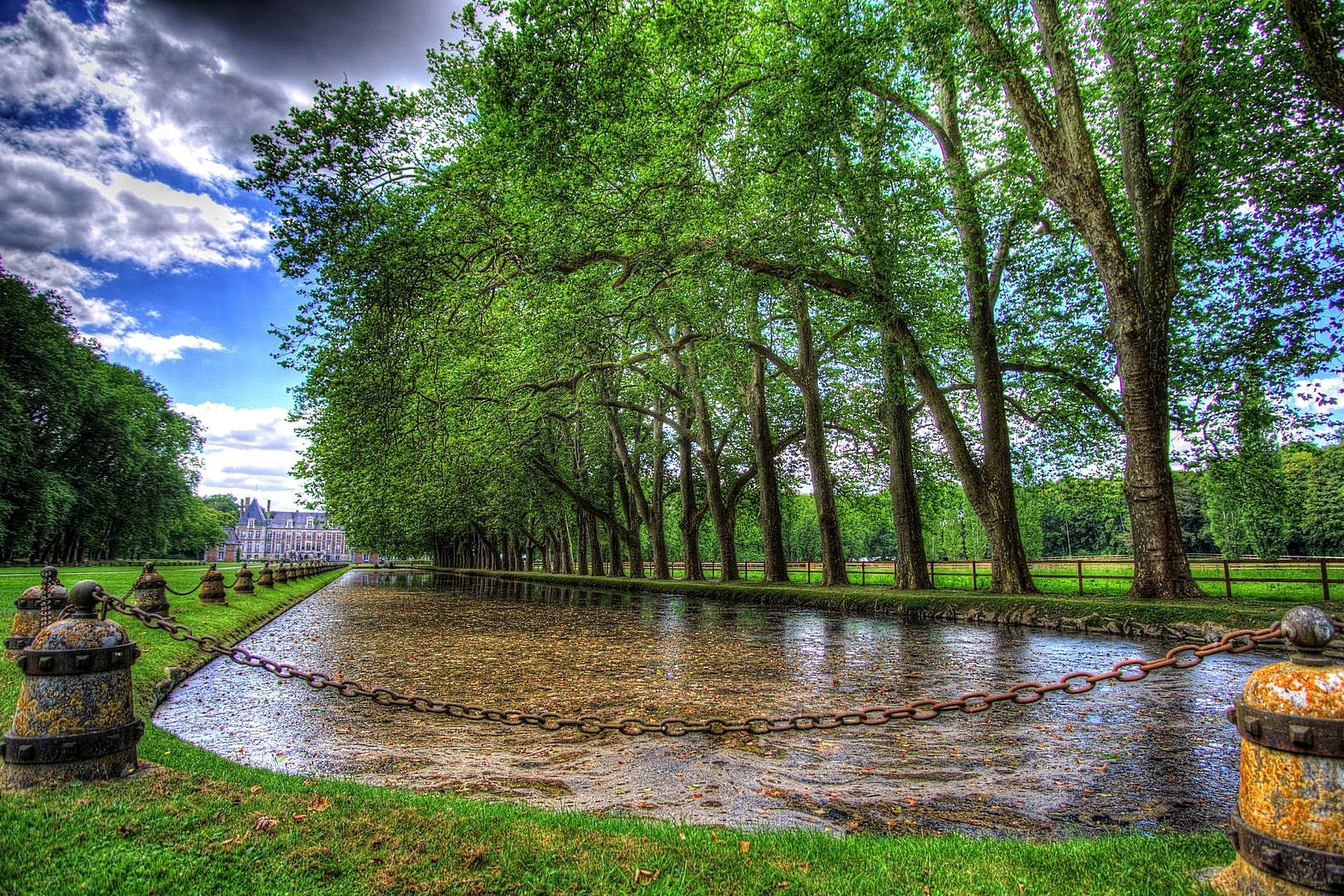
The canal and his border of old planes.

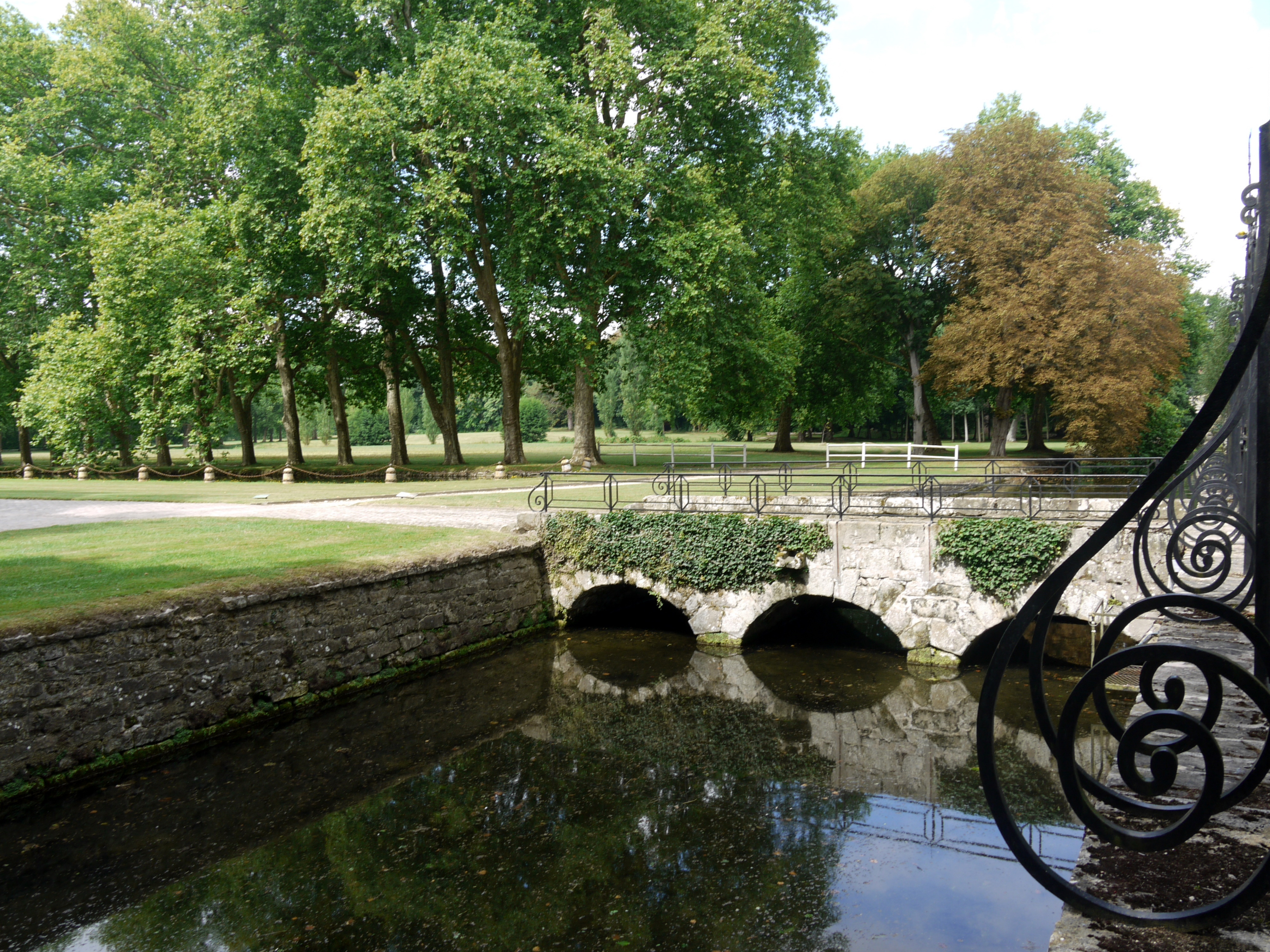
The moats.

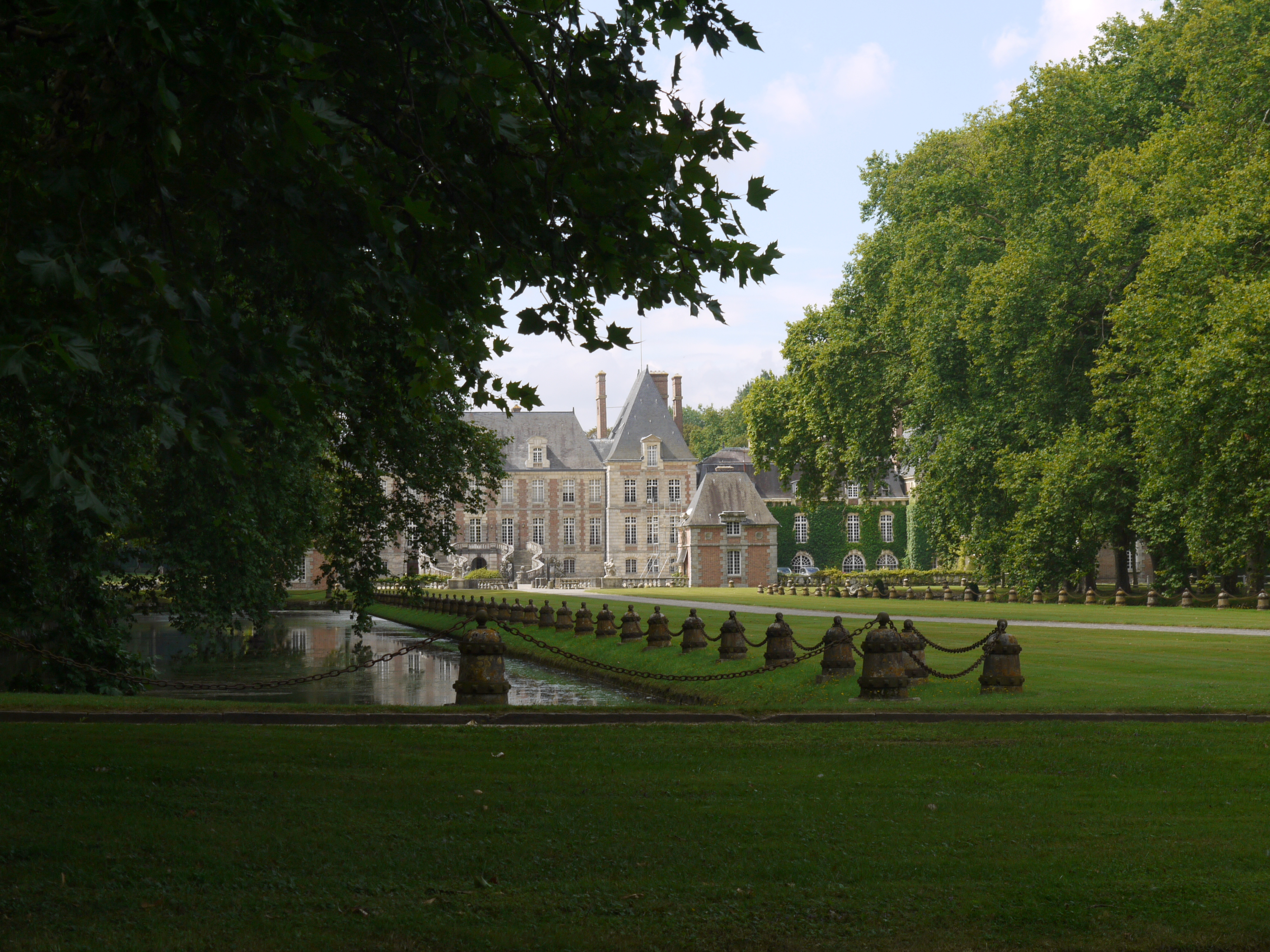
One of the ponds.

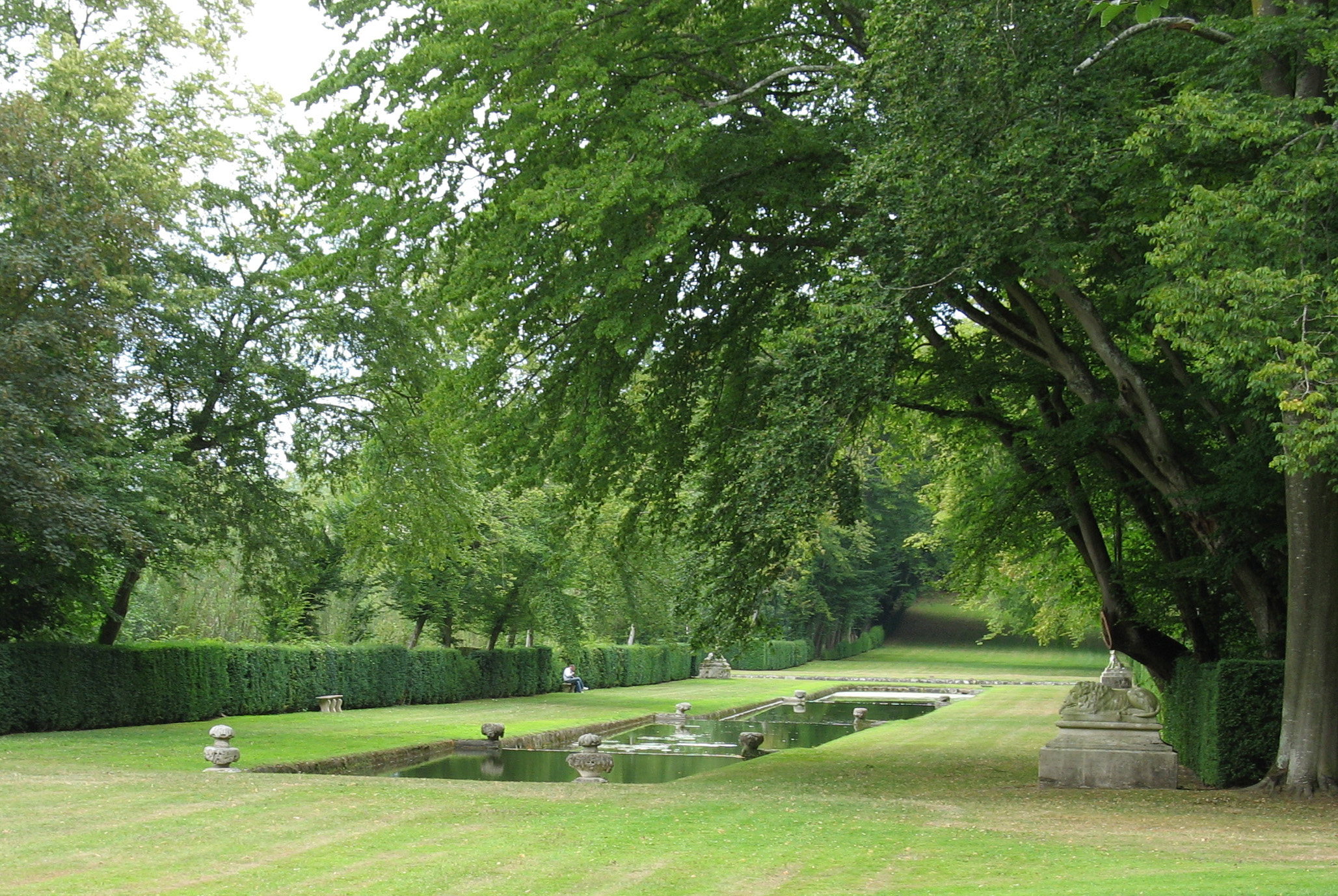
Another pond with several levels.

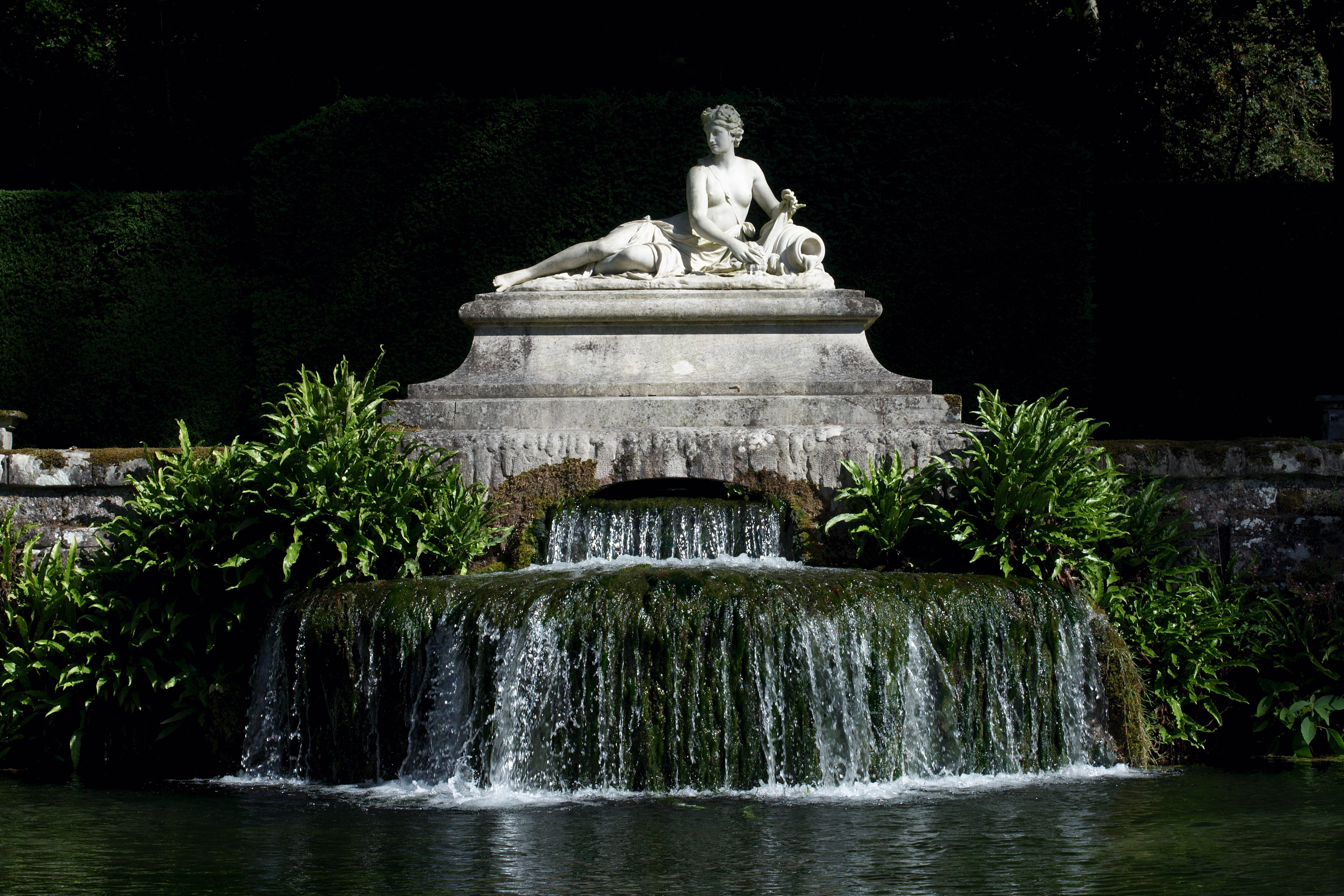
One Fountain with a sculpture.
