= Hôtel de Ville, Goussainville =

Town hall in Goussainville, Val-d'Oise, France

Hôtel de Ville
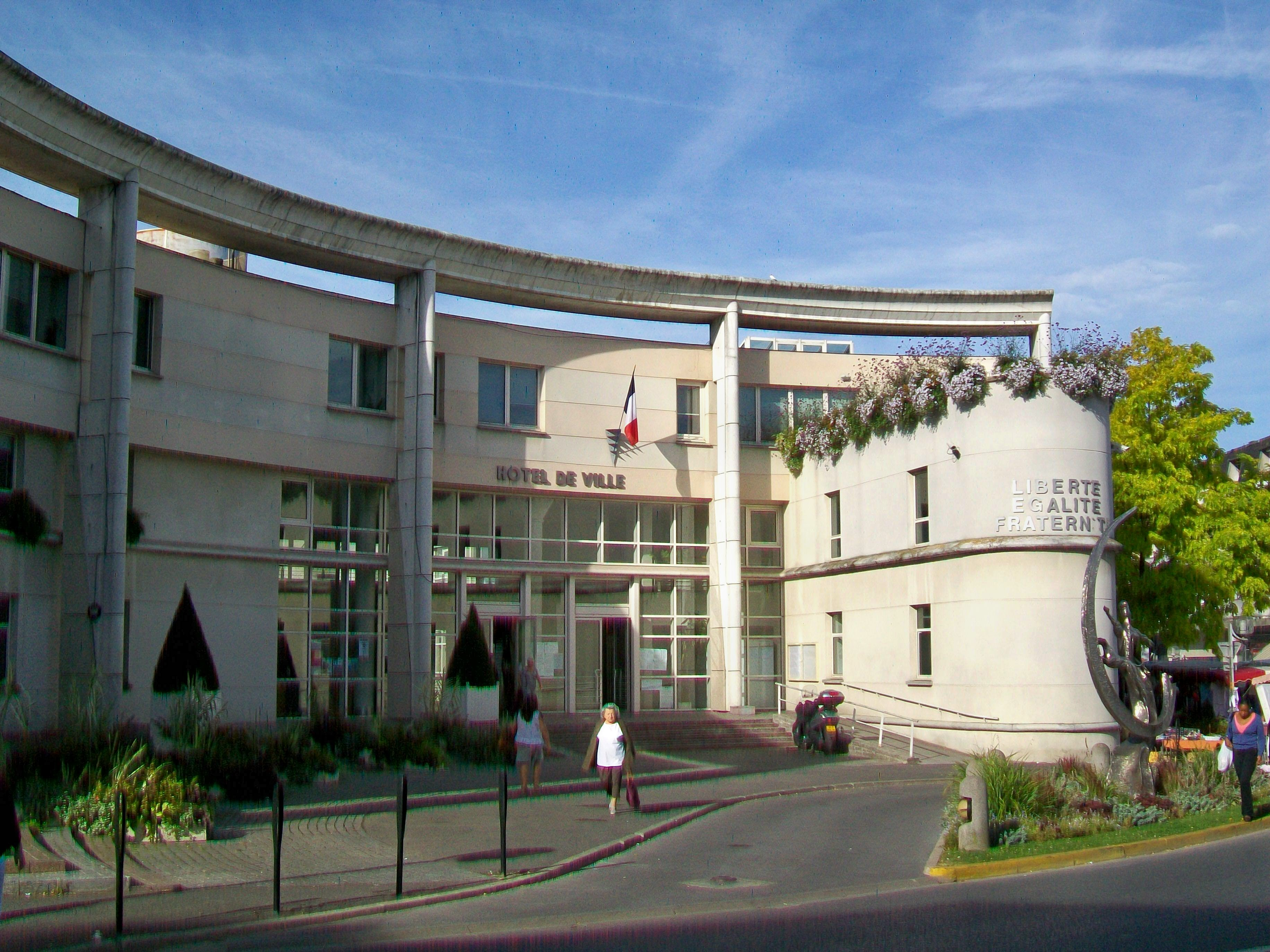
- The main frontage of the Hôtel de Ville in September 2011
- Interactive map of the Hôtel de Ville area

General information
- Type: City hall
- Architectural style: Modern style
- Location: Goussainville, France
- Coordinates: 49.0322°N 2.4733°E
- Completed: 1995

The Hôtel de Ville (French pronunciation: [otɛl də vil], City Hall) is a municipal building in Goussainville, Val-d'Oise, in the northeastern suburbs of Paris, standing on Place de la Charmeuse.

== History ==
Following the French Revolution, the town council initially met in the house of the mayor at the time. This arrangement continued until the late 1830s, when the council decided to establish a combined town hall and school. A suitable building, in the old part of the town, was selected and acquired in 1841.

The planning and development of Charles de Gaulle Airport, led to the decline of the old part of the town in the 1960s. Following a significant increase in population in the new part of the town, largely associated with residential developments such as the Cité Ampère and the Grandes Bormes, the town council led by the mayor, Roger Gaston, decided to relocate municipal services from the old part of the town to a building on Place de la Charmeuse in the new part of the town in 1964.

By the early 1990s, the building on Place de la Charmeuse was inadequate and the council led by the mayor, Élisabeth Hermanville, decided to demolish it and to build a modern town hall on the same site. The new building was designed in the modern style, built in concrete and glass and was completed in 1995.

The design involved a curved main frontage of five bays facing onto Place de la Charmeuse. The bays were separated by concrete piers which supported a curved concrete parapet which stretched the full width of the building. The fourth bay contained a glass entrance and, in the right-hand bay, there was a curved concrete structure which was projected forward. The other bays were fenestrated by casement windows on all three floors. Internally, the principal room was the Salle du Conseil (council chamber).

A Métalithe sculpture depicting a human figure with a greyhound was placed in front of the town hall. The sculpture recalled the greyhound which appeared in the coat of arms of Aymar-Charles-Marie de Nicolaÿ, Marquis of Goussainville, an aristocrat who was executed during the French Revolution. A monument in the form of an obelisk, dedicated to the political writer Henri Barbusse, which was also intended to commemorate the lives of local service personnel who had been executed by the Nazis in the Second World War, was installed on the opposite side of the road facing the town hall.
