= Nicolas de Nicolay =

French geographer

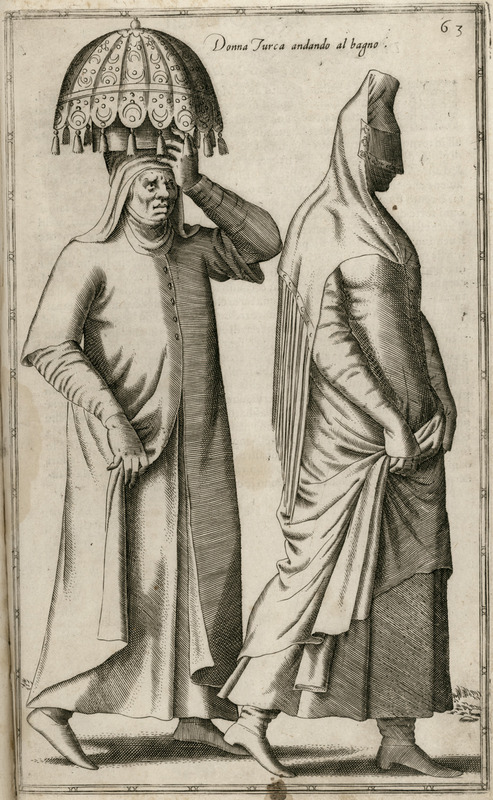

Nicolas de Nicolay, Sieur d'Arfeville & de Belair, (1517–1583) of the Nicolay (family) was a French geographer.

== Biography ==
Born at la Grave in Oisans, in the Dauphiné, he left France in 1542 to participate in the siege of Perpignan which was then held by Emperor Charles V of Austria.

In 1547, he sailed to Scotland where his intervention ended the siege of St Andrews Castle. In 1548, he returned to Scotland to take away Mary, Queen of Scots from Dumbarton Castle, sailing around the west coast of Ireland. He travelled around Germany, Denmark, England, Sweden, Italy, Spain, Greece and Turkey and served in the armies of most of these countries. On his return to France, Henry II made him Geographer Ordinary and Valet to the Chamber.

Around this time, he appears to have made a terrestrial globe that provided the model for the Oterschaden globe of c. 1600.

In 1551, Henry II ordered him to follow Gabriel d'Aramon, envoy and ambassador to the Grand Turk Suleiman the Magnificent. In the course of the voyage, his unofficial mission was to survey the places visited, including Istanbul. It has been suggested that one of his objectives was to spy for the French crown.

In 1583, he died in Soissons, where he was commissioner of artillery, after a stay at the royal castle of Moulins.

== Quatre premiers livres des navigations ==
Published in 1567, Quatre premiers livres des navigations (Travels in Turkey) recorded Nicolay's observations about the Ottoman court and peoples from his 1551 mission to Istanbul on behalf of the French government. The book served as the first comprehensive survey of customs and costumes in the Ottoman world, and is hailed as one of the earliest and most accurate depictions of the Islamic world to appear in Europe. Travels in Turkey achieved a high level of commercial success upon its release. It was later reissued and translated for a number of different countries, including Italy, the Netherlands, England, and Germany. The widespread popularity of the book contributed to the proliferation of costume books throughout Europe at the end of the 16th century, and continued to influence Orientalist artists well into the 19th century, such as Eugène Delacroix and Jean-Auguste-Dominique Ingres.

Travels in Turkey is divided in four books, following Nicolay's voyage to Istanbul, accounts of ethnic groups and Ottoman court life, and the religious and military administration in Istanbul. Louis Danet made 60 engravings based on Nicolay's original drawings, which serve as the core of the books, and each print is followed by a caption, describing Islamic ritual, religion and monuments. The images cover all aspects of Ottoman daily life, and depict figures ranging from sultans and sultanas to wrestlers, cooks and Janissary generals. The images are typical of costume books, and consist of lone figures, depicted on a very sparse background, which emphasizes the dress of the figure, rather than geography. In the costume book, figures are schematized and follow general types, and David Brafman writes that "Nicolay, or his engravers, render facial expressions in an exaggerated style. Emotional reaction are evoked artistically, whether it be identification with a mother, sympathy for a Christian slave, or fascination with exotic and 'monstrous' alien practice". Although the book undoubtedly played to European readers' preconceived notions of Islamic alterity in its graphic depictions of dervishes, particularly those of the unorthodox Qalandariyya tariqa, recent scholarship into contemporary European and Ottoman accounts of these groups has demonstrated the veracity of the practices they depict.

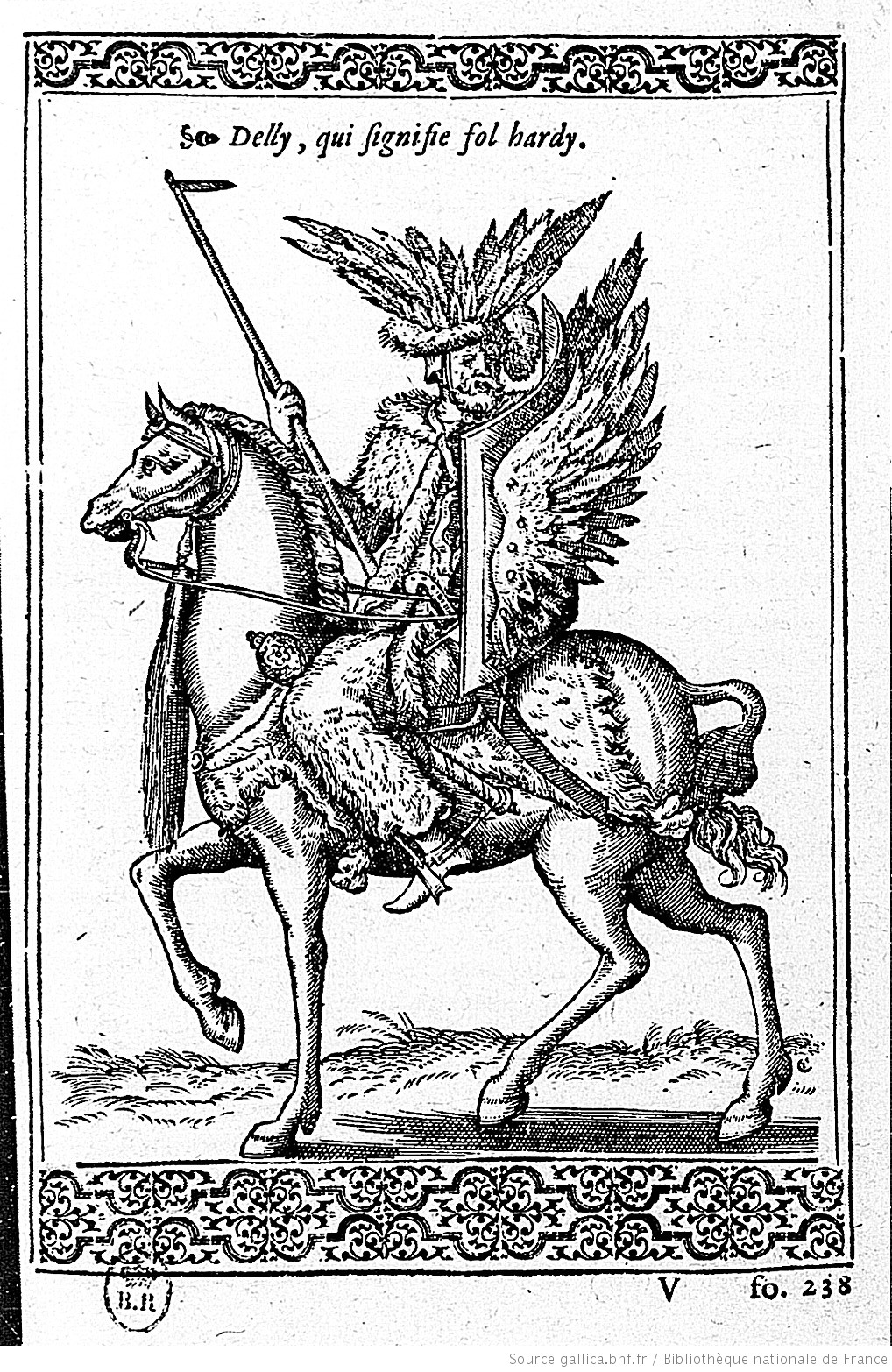
Delli horseman from a 1576 Italian edition of Nicolas de Nicolay's Navigations,1567.

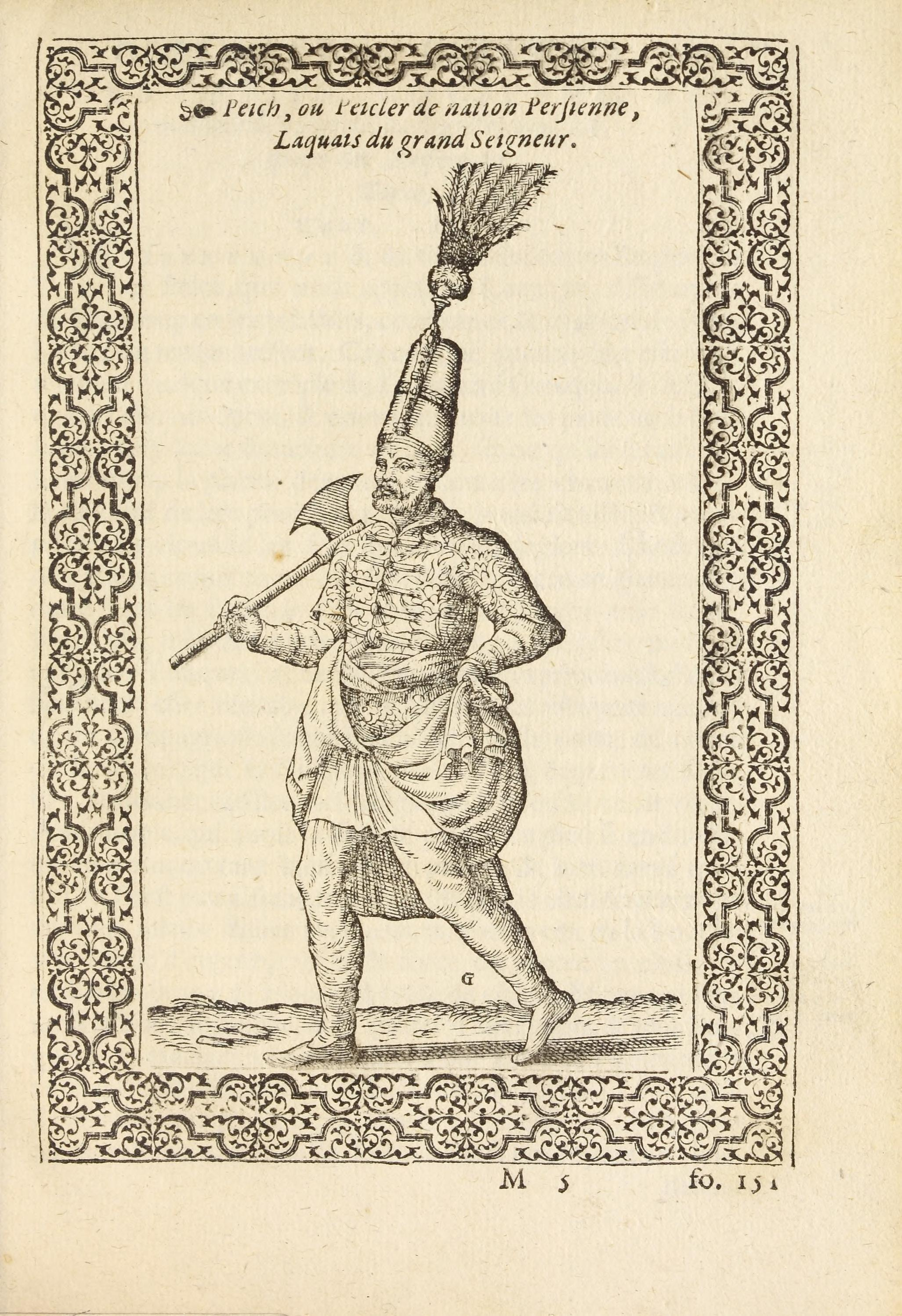
Peich or Lackey from a 1576 Italian edition of Nicolas de Nicolay's Navigations, 1567.

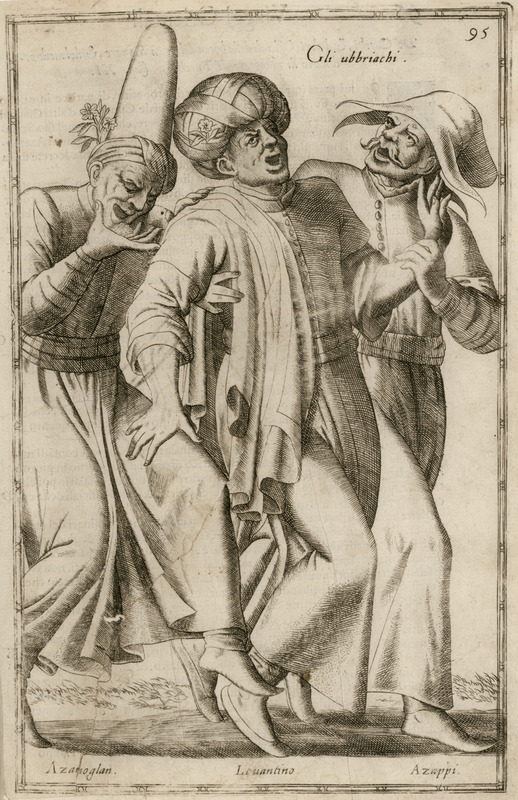
Gli Ubbriachi

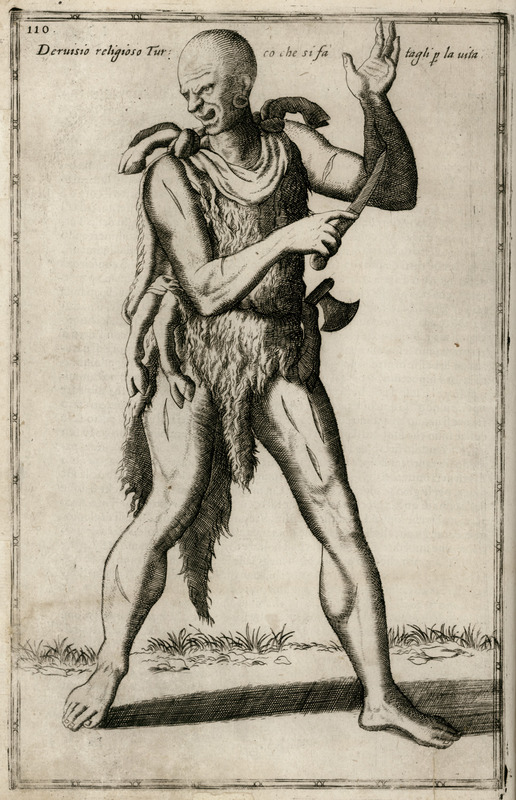
Deruisio religioso Turco che si fa tagli p[er] la vita

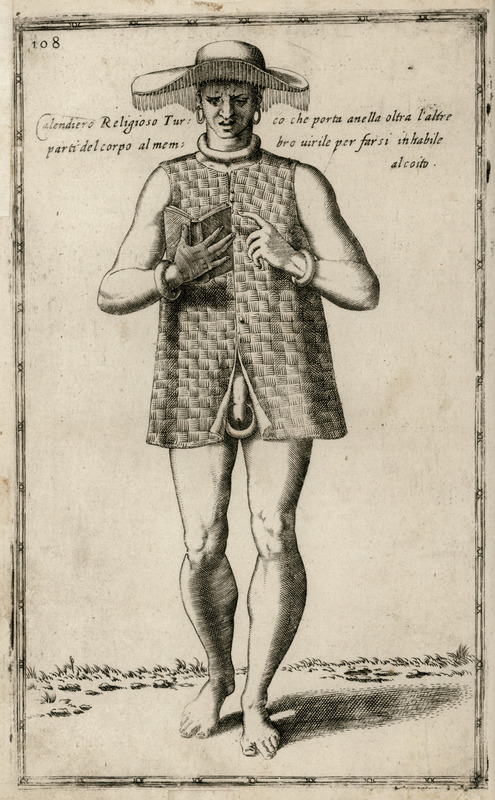
Calendiero Religioso Turco che porta anella oltra l'altre parti del corpo al membro virile

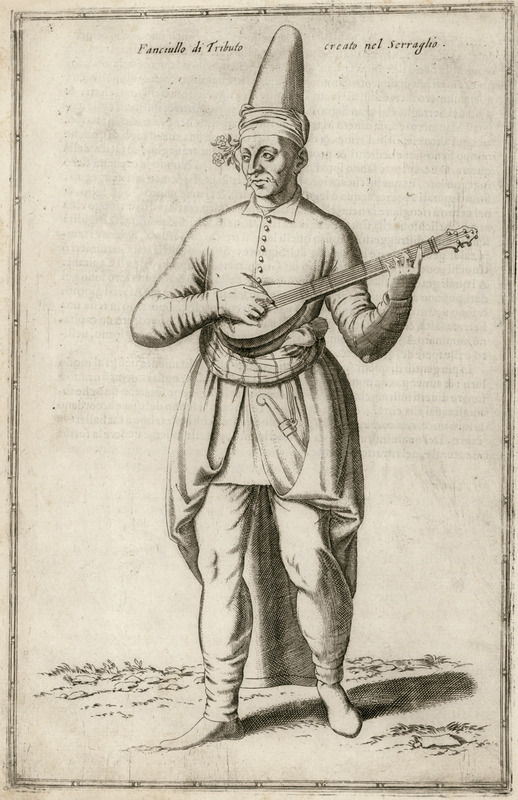
Fanciullo di Tributo creato nel Serraglio

== Works and maps ==
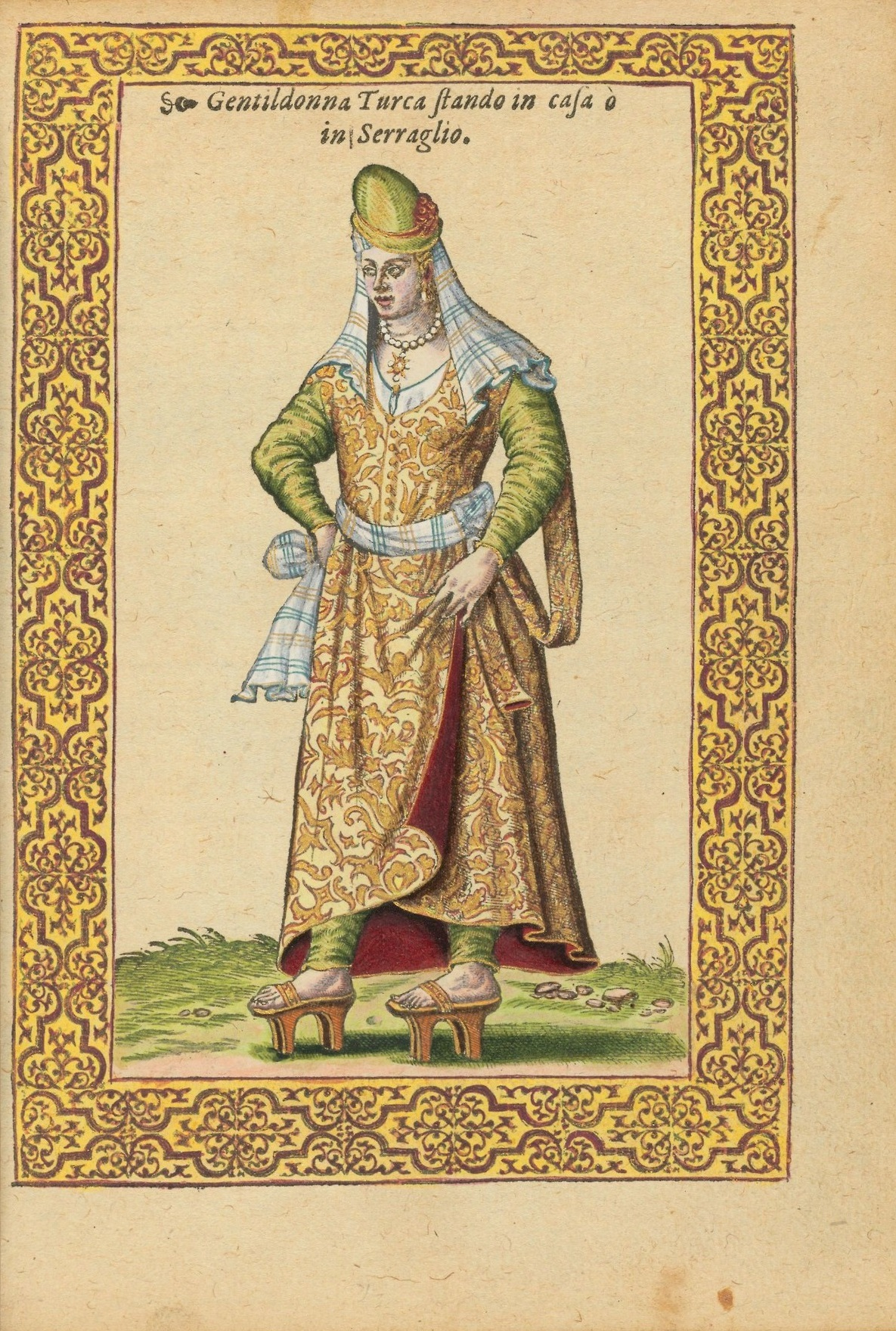
Illustration from Le navigationi et viaggi nella Turchia, 1577

He wrote several books:

- Description générale des Pays et Duché de Berry (1567).
- Quatre premiers livres des navigations (1568)
- Description générale du Bourbonnais en 1569, ou Histoire de cette province (villes, bourgs, châteaux, fiefs, monastères, familles anciennes (published in 1875).
- Description générale de la ville de Lyon et des anciennes provinces du Lyonnais et du Beaujolais (published in 1881).
- Discovrs et histoire veritable des navigations, Anvers, A. Coninx,' 1586. From the Rare Book and Special Collections Division at the Library of Congress
- Les navigations, peregrinations et voyages faicts en la Turquie, (Antwerp 1576) at Bibliothèque nationale de France (Gallica site)
- Nicolas D'Arfeville's map of Scotland at the National Library of Scotland

== Sources ==
- Voyage en Orient au XVIe siècle de Nicolas de Nicolay, Dauphinois, par Honoré Pallias, 1857.
- Description du Berry et diocèse de Bourges au XVIe siècle par Nicolas de Nicolay Dauphinois, géographe et valet de chambre du roi Charles IX [...] avec une notice sur l'auteur par M. Victor Advielle, Paris, A. Aubry et Dumoulin, 1865.
- R. Herve,"L'oeuvre cartographique de Nicolas de Nicolay et d'Antoine de Leval, 1544-1619", Bulletin de la Section de Géographie du Comité des Travaux Historiques et Scientifiques (Paris), LXVIII (1955), 223–63.
- Roger Hervé, L'Œuvre cartographique de Nicolas de Nicolay et d'Antoine de Laval (1544–1619), Paris, Imprimerie nationale, 1956.
- Franz Wawrik, "Der Erdglobus des Johannes Oterschaden", Der Globusfreund, Nos.25-27, 1978, pp. 155–167.
