= William Nicolay =

British soldier

Lieutenant General Sir William Nicolay KCH CB (14 April 1771 – 3 May 1842) was a British Army officer present at the Battle of Waterloo who later became Governor of Mauritius.

== Life ==
He was the third son of Frederick de Nicolay, Principal Page to Princess Charlotte of Mecklenburg-Strelitz, wife of King George III. He was born at St. James's Palace on 14 April 1771 and was a member of the British branch of the Nicolay family.

He entered the Royal Military Academy, Woolwich, as a cadet on 1 Nov. 1785, but did not obtain a commission as second lieutenant Royal Artillery until 28 May 1790. In April 1791 he embarked for India with two newly formed companies of Royal Artillery, known as the 'East India Detachment,’ which subsequently formed the nucleus of the old sixth battalion (Duncan, Hist. Roy. Artillery, ii. 2).

He served under Lord Cornwallis at the siege of Seringapatam in 1792, and was an assistant engineer at the reduction of Pondicherry in 1793. Meanwhile, with some other artillery subalterns, he had been transferred in November 1792 to the Royal Engineers, in which he became first lieutenant on 15 August 1793 and captain on 29 August 1798. He was present at the capture of Saint Lucia, and was left there as commanding engineer by Sir John Moore. He afterwards served under Sir Ralph Abercromby at Tobago and Trinidad until compelled to return home by a broken thigh, which incapacitated him for duty for two years.

When the Royal Staff Corps was formed, to provide a corps for Quartermaster General's and engineer duties which should be under the Horse Guards (instead of under the ordnance), Nicolay was appointed major of the new corps from 26 June 1801, and on 4 April 1805 became lieutenant colonel. He was employed on the defences of the Kent and Sussex coasts during the invasion alarms of 1804–1805, and on intelligence duties under Sir John Moore in Spain in 1808, and was present at Corunna.

He became a brevet colonel on 4 June 1813 and in 1815 proceeded to Belgium in command of five companies of the Royal Staff Corps, and was present at the Battle of Waterloo. During the battle he received a wound to the head and was unhorsed by a splinter, but did not report himself wounded. Afterwards he received the Companion of the Order of the Bath (CB) and Waterloo Medal then proceeded with the army for the occupation of Paris. There he remained until the division destined to occupy the frontier, of which the Staff Corps formed part, moved to Cambray. He became a major general on 12 August 1819.

He was Governor of Dominica from April 1824 to July 1831, Governor of Saint Kitts and Nevis, (which included Nevis, Antigua, and the Virgin Islands) from January 1831 to December 1832, and Governor of Mauritius from 1832 to February 1840, an anxious time, as, owing to the recent abolition of slavery and other causes, there was much ill-feeling in the island towards the British.

Nicolay was promoted to lieutenant general on 10 January 1837, and was appointed colonel, 1st West India Regiment, 30 November 1839. He died at his residence, Oriel Lodge, Cheltenham, on 3 May 1842. He married in 1806 the second daughter of the Rev. E. Law of Whittingham, Northumberland.

Government offices
Preceded by Sir Charles Colville	Governor of Mauritius; 1833–1840	Succeeded by Sir Lionel Smith
