= Aimar-Charles-Marie de Nicolaï =

French magistrate (1747–1794)

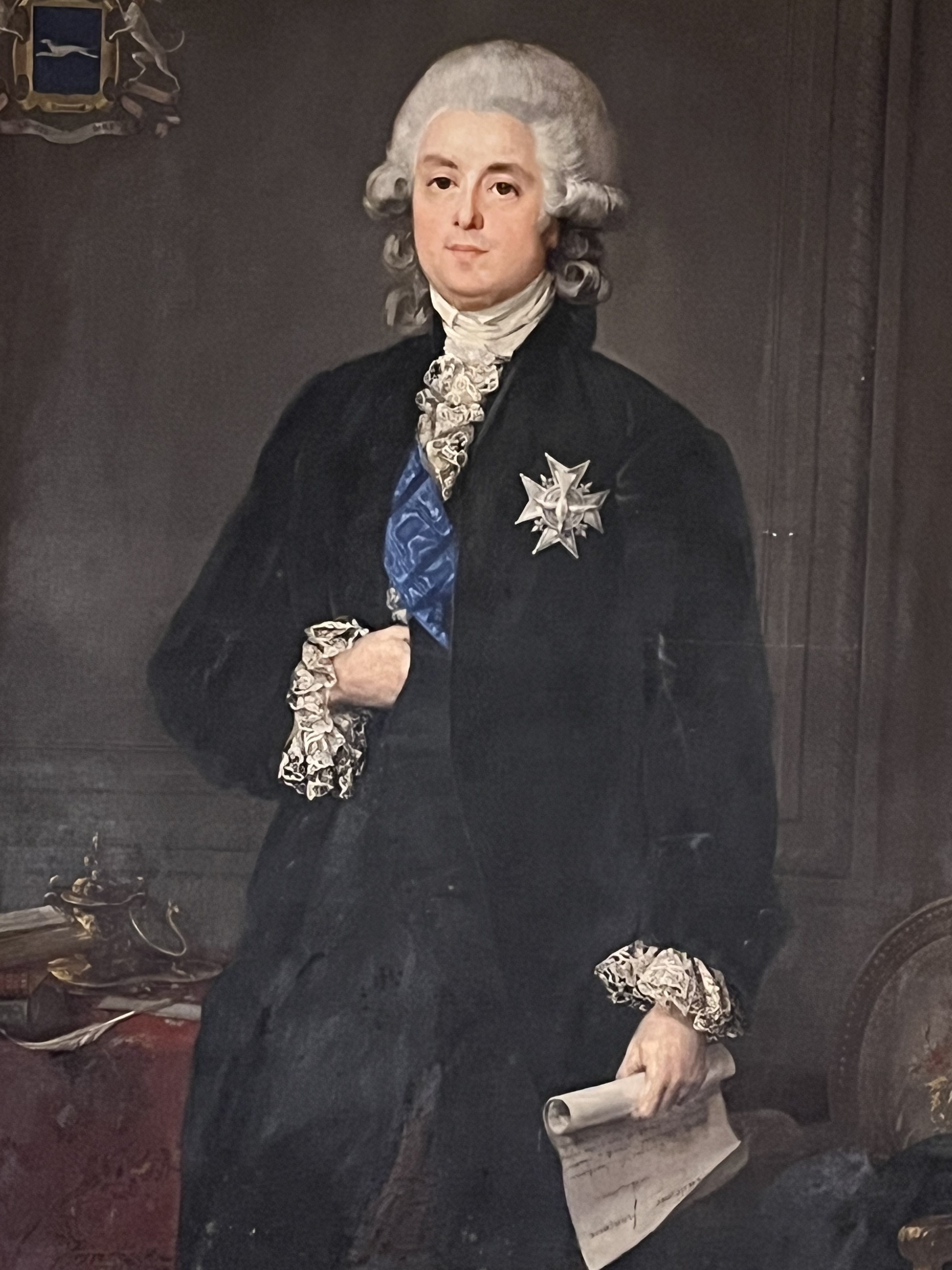
Aymar-Charles-Marie de Nicolaÿ - Pdt Cc

Aymar-Charles-Marie de Nicolaÿ, Marquis of Goussainville, was a French magistrate born on 14 August 1747 in Paris, where he was guillotined on 7 July 1794.

He served as Conseiller du roi in all councils and was the first president of the Cour des comptes.

== Biography ==
Born into the Nicolaÿ family, he was the son of Aymar Jean de Nicolaÿ, Marquis of Goussainville, Lord of Osny, first president of the Chambre des comptes de Paris, and Madeleine de Vintimille du Luc.

He began his judicial career in 1766, at nineteen, as a counsellor at the Parlement de Paris.

He was received on 25 April 1768 as first president of the Chambre des comptes de Paris in survivance of his father. When the latter resigned in 1773, he succeeded him in that office.

His assumption of office coincided with the suppression of the parlements. In order not to emulate the example of the parliamentary bodies, he sought to avoid tensions between his jurisdiction and the royal power by restricting, in particular, the practice of the right of remonstrance.

On 18 December 1788, he was elected to the second chair of the Académie française, succeeding the Marquis de Chastellux. He was received on 12 March 1789 by Claude‑Carloman de Rulhière. In his reception speech, the praise he bestowed on Louis XVI drew murmurs from the audience.

Renowned for his oratory skills, he was elected in 1789 as deputy of the Nobility of Paris to the Estates General of 1789, but he declined the election.

On 30 May 1789, he was appointed by Louis XVI as Chancellor‑Keeper of the Seals of the Orders of the King, until the suppression of the Order of the Holy Spirit in 1791.

In autumn 1789, he intervened before the Constituent Assembly of 1789 to have the prerogatives of his jurisdiction maintained, or even strengthened, but was unable to prevent its suppression like the other sovereign courts of the Monarchy. He presided over it until its last session, on 19 September 1791.

He was the last to hold this office of first president, a position his family had occupied for two centuries.

He then retired to his Château de Courances, where his proximity to the royal family exposed him to surveillance and vexations from the revolutionary administration.

Arrested, he was condemned to death as an enemy of the people and guillotined during the Reign of Terror in 1794.

As recorded in the Moniteur: "Nicolaÿ convicted of having become an enemy of the people by conspiring against its liberty and safety, by provoking, through prison revolts, the assassination and dissolution of the national representation, etc., was condemned to death (19 Messidor)."

He was executed a few days after both his brother Aymar Charles François de Nicolaÿ, first president of the Grand Council, and his eldest son.

A Freemason, he was present as a visitor at the lighting of the fires of the Parisian lodge "La Candeur" on 22 October 1775.

He resided at Château de Courances and in Paris at the former Hôtel de Chaulnes, Place Royale, today Place des Vosges.

=== Marriage and issue ===
In 1768 he married Philippine Potier de Novion (Paris, 26 November 1748 – Paris, 10 May 1820), the younger of the two daughters of André IV Potier de Novion, Marquis of Grignon, Lord of Courances, président à mortier at the Parlement de Paris, and Marie Philippe Tachereau. She brought him the estate of Courances, where they made some improvements. This estate passed after them to their youngest son, Théodore. She was buried at Courances. They had six children:

- Aymard Marie Léon de Nicolaÿ (Paris, 10 July 1770 – guillotined in Paris, 9 July 1794);
- Aymardine de Nicolaÿ (Paris, 23 May 1772 – Gaillac, 28 September 1806), married in 1799 to Bernard Charles Louis Victor de Lostanges of Béduer (1773–1812), with issue;
- Aymardine Aglaé de Nicolaÿ (Paris, 8 November 1773 – Toulouse, 7 March 1852), married in 1800 to Maurice Jean de Villeneuve‑Arifat (1767–1824);
- Christian de Nicolaÿ, Marquis of Goussainville, Count of the Empire (1811), chamberlain of Napoleon I, Peer of France (Paris, 23 August 1777 – Paris, 14 January 1839), married in 1801 to Alexandrine Malon de Bercy, heiress of the Château de Bercy (1781–1808), with issue;
- Aymard Raymond de Nicolaÿ, Baron of the Empire (1812) (Paris, 24 January 1781 – Paris, 25 March 1842), married in 1806 to Marie‑Charlotte de Murat de Lestang (1788–1842), Lady of Montfort-le-Gesnois, with issue;
- Aymard‑Charles‑Marie‑Théodore de Nicolaÿ, Peer of France from 1814 to 1830 (Paris, 31 July 1782 – Geneva, 7 June 1871), married in 1809 to Augustine de Lévis, co‑heiress of the Château de Champs‑sur‑Marne (1788–1848), with issue.

== See also ==
- List of members of the Académie Française
