= François de Nicolay =

French farm manager, arboriculturist and politician

Count François de Nicolay
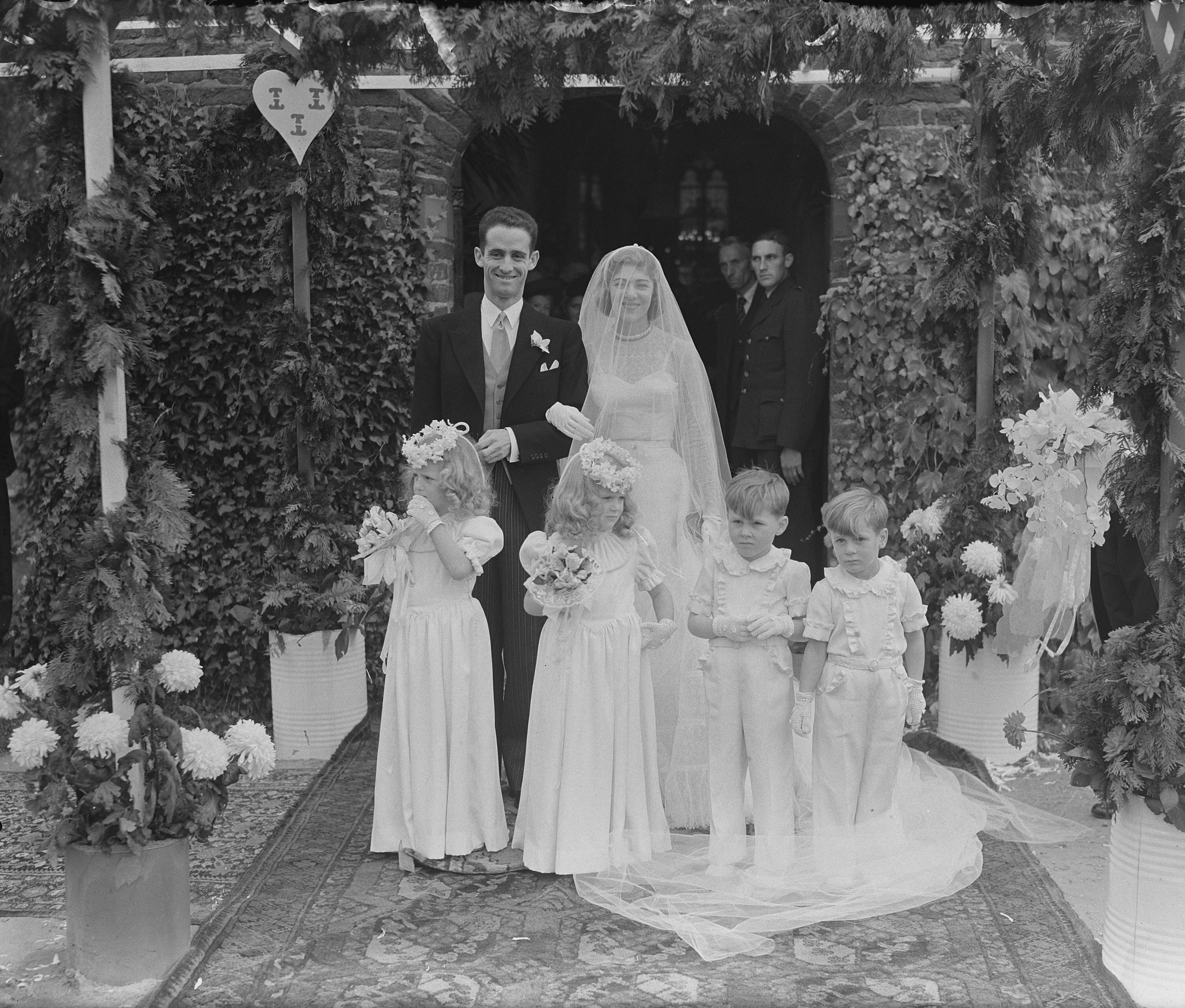
- François de Nicolay with Marie-Hélène van Zuylen van Nijevelt on their wedding day (October 11, 1950)
- Born: 31 August 1919; Le Lude, Sarthe, France
- Died: 21 November 1963 (aged 44)
- Education: École supérieure des sciences économiques et commerciales
- Occupations: Farmer, arboriculturist, politician
- Political party: Union for the New Republic, Independent Republicans
- Spouse: Marie-Hélène van Zuylen van Nijevelt (1950-1956)
- Children: Philippe de Nicolay (b. 1955)

Count François de Nicolay (31 August 1919 – 21 November 1963) was a member of the House of Nicolay in France who was a farm manager, arboriculturist, and a politician who was elected to the Senate of France.

== Early life and education ==
Count François de Nicolay was born 31 August 1919 in the town of Le Lude in the Sarthe department of France. By birth he was part of the French nobility, a descendant of the Talhouët family. His grandfather was the mayor of Le Lude for more than fifty years. His great-uncle, Auguste de Talhouët-Roy, owner of the Château du Lude, served as Minister of Public Works in the Second French Empire, and was a Senator for Sarthe between 1876 and 1882.

After graduating from the ESSEC Business school in Paris, François de Nicolay remained in the city where he went to work as an executive with the women's magazine, Femmes d'aujourd'hui. At the outbreak of World War II, he joined the French military and served until the Armistice was signed and the German Occupation began. Back home in Le Lude, he oversaw forestry and farming operations which included the breeding of Thoroughbred horses.

== Political career ==
Following the end of the War, on May 8, 1945, François de Nicolay was elected as a council member for Le Lude and subsequently served as deputy mayor. In 1949, he was elected to the General Council of Sarthe and was its president in 1952 and 1958.

In 1959, François de Nicolay was elected to the Senate of France as an Independent Republican. Among his responsibilities, he served on the Committee for Foreign Affairs, Defense and Armed Forces. While still in office, he died at age forty-four in 1963 as a result of a traffic accident. The Avenue François-de-Nicolay in Sablé-sur-Sarthe and Place François de Nicolay in Le Lude are named in his memory.

== Marriage ==
In 1950, François de Nicolay married the American born Marie-Hélène van Zuylen van Nijevelt, daughter of the Dutch baron Egmont van Zuylen van Nyevelt, who owned De Haar Castle in Haarzuilens. Marie-Hélène van Zuylen van Nijevelt was also a descendant of the Rothschild family (the great-granddaughter of Salomon James de Rothschild). François and Marie-Hélène had one son and heir (before their marriage was dissolved in 1956):

- Count Philippe de Nicolay (b. 1955), who is a director of Paris Orleans PA, a French investment bank belonging to the Rothschild family, who married 1982 Princess Sophie de Ligne, the daughter of Belgium's Antoine, Prince of Ligne.
