= Royal Staff Corps =

- Active: 1799–1837
- Allegiance: United Kingdom
- Branch: British Army
- Role: Military engineering
- Size: 10 companies (797 men)
- Engagements: French Revolutionary Wars; Egypt Campaign; Napoleonic Wars; Hanover Expedition; Peninsular War; Walcheren Expedition; Hundred Days

Commanders
- Notable commanders: William Nicolay; Robert Lawrence Dundas

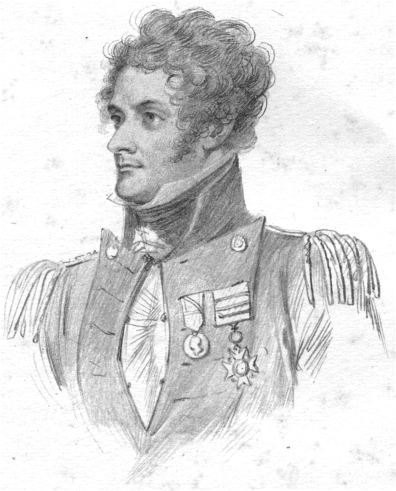
William Staveley in the uniform of the Royal Staff Corps

The Royal Staff Corps was a corps of the British Army responsible for military engineering which was founded in c. 1800 and disbanded in c. 1837. At the time, the Royal Engineers and Corps of Royal Sappers and Miners were administered as part of the Board of Ordnance. Relations between the Ordnance and the Commander-in-Chief of the Forces, Prince Frederick, Duke of York, were poor and a major motivation for the Corps' creation was to provide a source of engineering expertise under his direct control. It was generally responsible for short-term military engineering works, with the Royal Engineers and Corps of Royal Sappers and Miners remaining responsible for permanent works, but the boundaries between the functions of the corps were blurred. The Royal Staff Corps answered to the Quartermaster-General instead of to the Board of Ordnance. On its disbandment, most of its personnel transferred to the Royal Engineers and the Corps of Royal Sappers and Miners.
