= Goussainville, Val-d'Oise =

Goussainville
- Commune
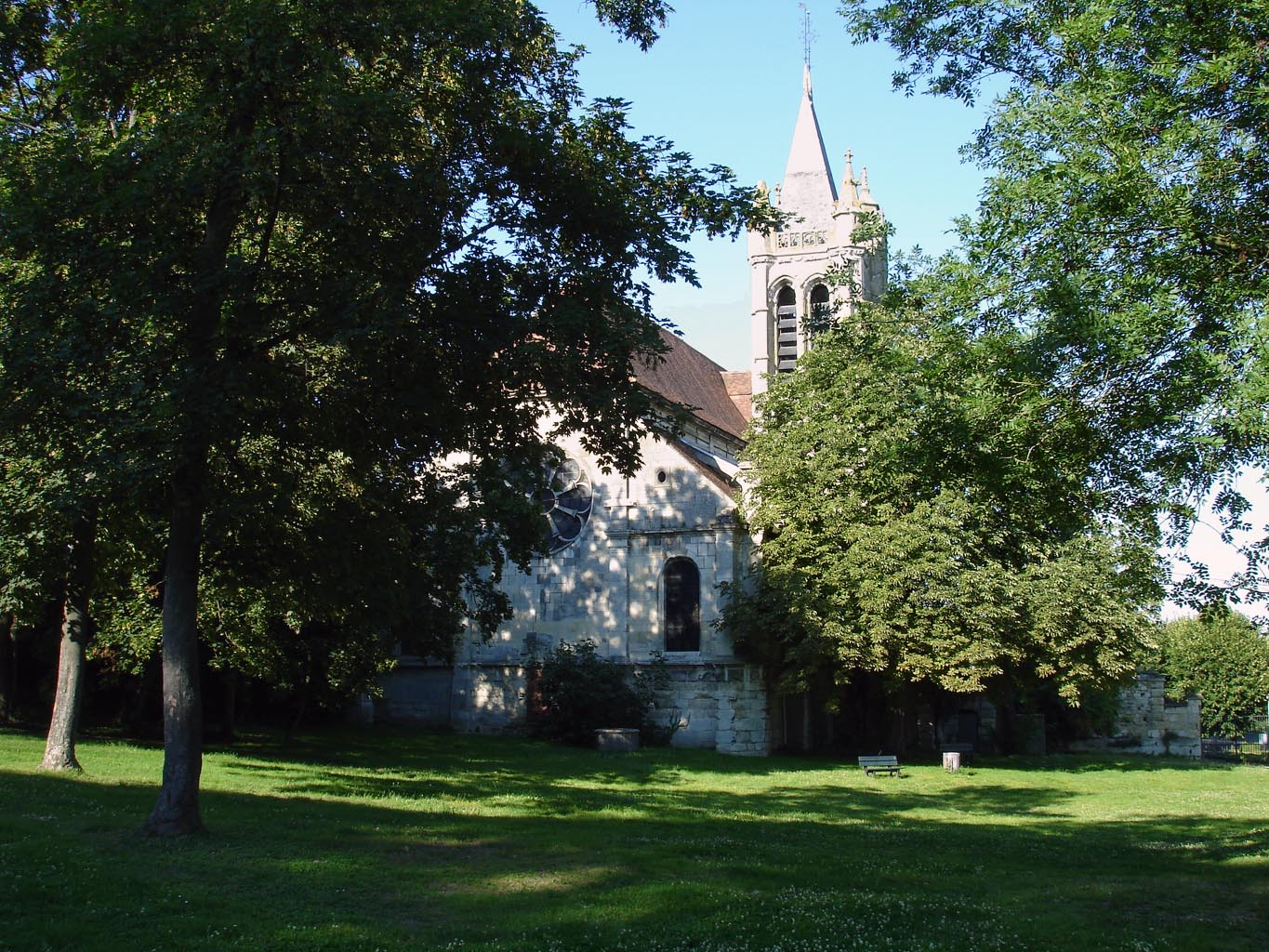
- Saint Pierre-Saint Paul

- Coat of arms

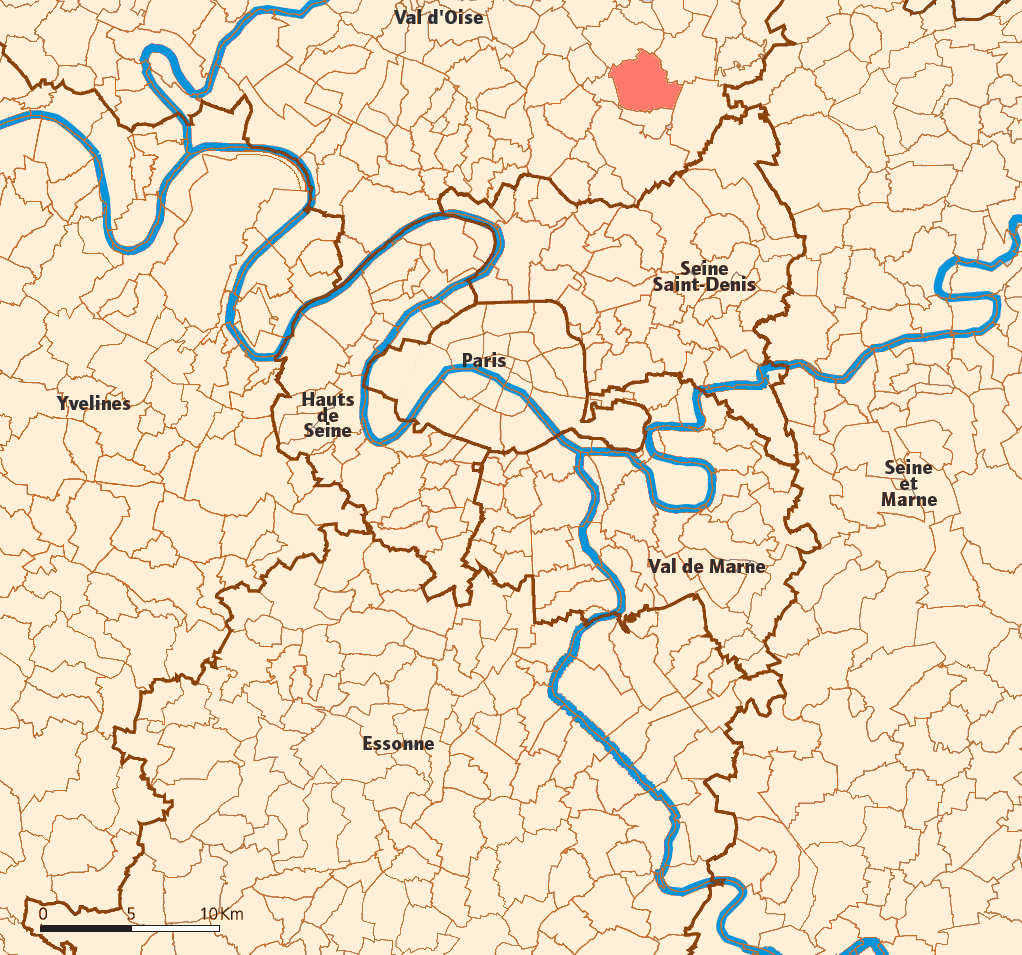
- Location (in red) within Paris inner and outer suburbs
- Location of Goussainville
- Location within France Location within Île-de-France (region)
- Coordinates: 49°01′57″N 2°28′29″E
- Country: France
- Region: Île-de-France
- Department: Val-d'Oise
- Arrondissement: Sarcelles
- Canton: Goussainville
- Intercommunality: CA Roissy Pays de France

Government
  - Mayor (2020–2026): Abdelaziz Hamida
- Area^{1}: 11.52 km^{2} (4.45 sq mi)
- Elevation: 70 m (230 ft)
- Highest elevation: 109 m (358 ft)
- Lowest elevation: 56 m (184 ft)
- Population (2023): 31,301
  - Density: 2,717/km^{2} (7,037/sq mi)
- Time zone: UTC+01:00 (CET)
  - Summer (DST): UTC+02:00 (CEST)
- INSEE/Postal code: 95280 /95190
- ^{1} French Land Register data, which excludes lakes, ponds, glaciers > 1 km^{2} (0.386 sq mi or 247 acres) and river estuaries.

Goussainville (French pronunciation: [ɡusɛ̃vil]) is a commune in the department of Val-d'Oise, northern France. It is located 20.6 km (12.8 mi) north-northeast from the centre of Paris, near Charles de Gaulle Airport. Goussainville is part of the urban unit (agglomeration) of Paris. The old village Goussainville, 2 km south of the current town centre, is known as a ghost town.

== 1973 air show crash ==
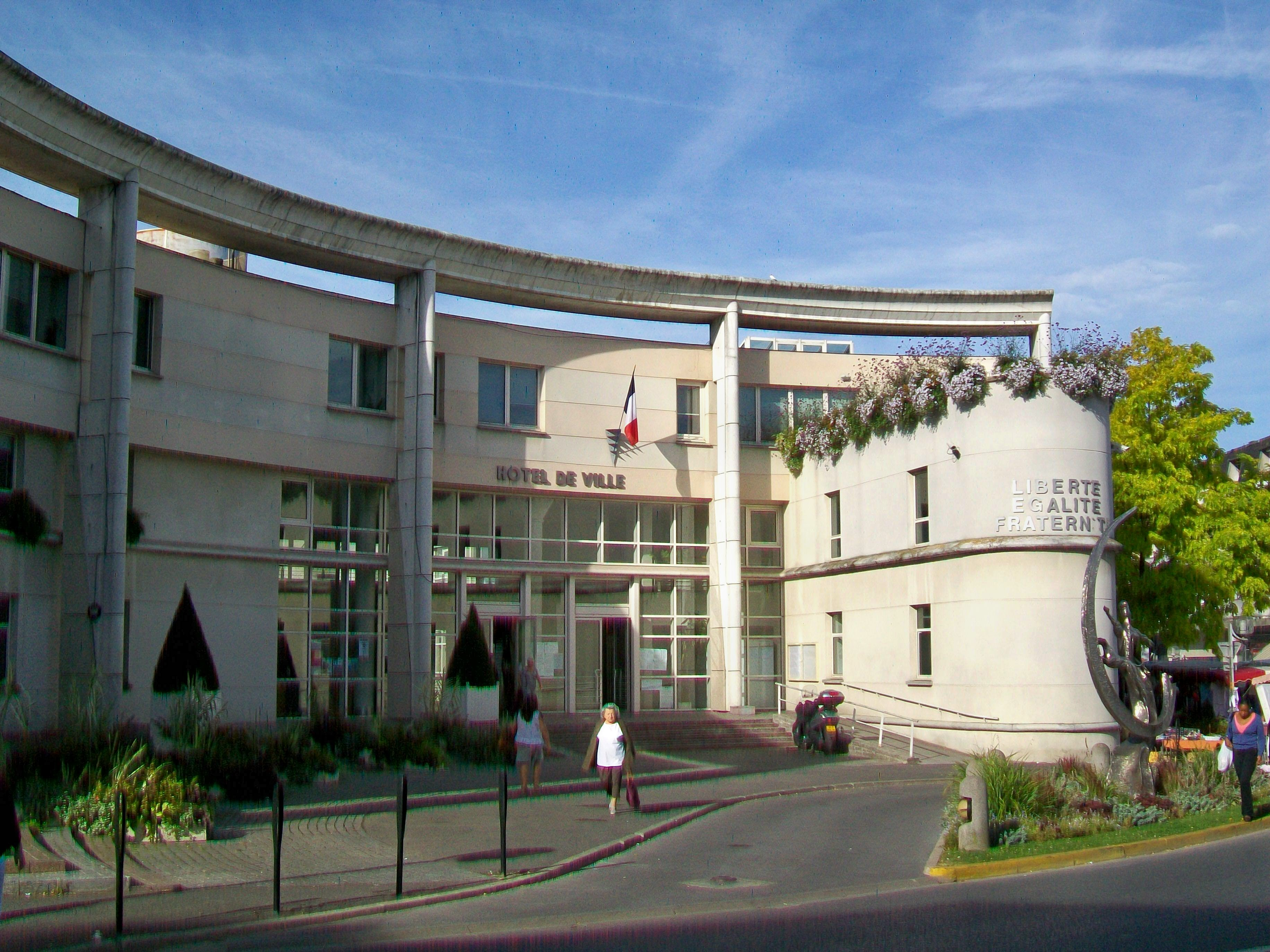
The Hôtel de Ville

In 1973, Goussainville was the site of the crash of a supersonic Russian Tupolev Tu-144 which had been performing aerobatic manoeuvres in the Paris Air Show at le Bourget airport, 8 km to the south. All six people on board the aircraft and eight more on the ground were killed, and fifteen houses in Goussainville's south-east district were destroyed. Sixty people on the ground were injured.

In 1974, a year after the Tupolev Tu-144 crash, Charles de Gaulle Airport opened, putting Goussainville directly under the flight path to a busy airport. The noise of aircraft flying low overhead became a major disturbance and acted as a "constant reminder of the deadly crash."

The town is less than 6 km from Gonesse, the site of the crash of the supersonic Concorde operating as Air France Flight 4590 on 25 July 2000.

The Hôtel de Ville was completed in 1995.

== Population ==
Historical population

Year	Pop.	±% p.a.
1793	850	—
1821	654	−0.93%
1846	628	−0.16%
1872	546	−0.54%
1901	585	+0.24%
1911	759	+2.64%
1921	958	+2.36%
1926	2,556	+21.69%
1931	4,667	+12.80%
1936	6,201	+5.85%
1946	6,789	+0.91%

Year	Pop.	±% p.a.
1954	9,350	+4.08%
1962	13,109	+4.31%
1968	16,197	+3.59%
1975	25,182	+6.51%
1982	23,543	−0.96%
1990	24,812	+0.66%
1999	27,356	+1.09%
2007	30,310	+1.29%
2012	31,255	+0.62%
2017	30,637	−0.40%
2023	31,301	+0.36%

Source: EHESS and INSEE (1968-2023)

== Transport ==
Goussainville is served by two stations on Paris RER line D: Goussainville and Les Noues. Paris's Charles de Gaulle Airport is located 9 km (5.6 mi) away, which is a 15 minutes drive from Goussainville.

== Education ==
As of 2016, there are 1,718 pupils in 13 public pre-schools and 2,782 elementary school pupils in 13 public primary schools. There are a total of 19 campuses with a total of about 4,500 students.

Junior high schools

- Collège Pierre Curie
- Collège Georges Charpak
- Collège Montaigne
- Collège Robespierre

Senior high schools:

- Lycée Romain Rolland

== See also ==
- Communes of the Val-d'Oise department
