= Creusot steam hammer =

1877 steam hammer in Le Creusot, France

Coordinates: 46.78664°N 4.432913°E

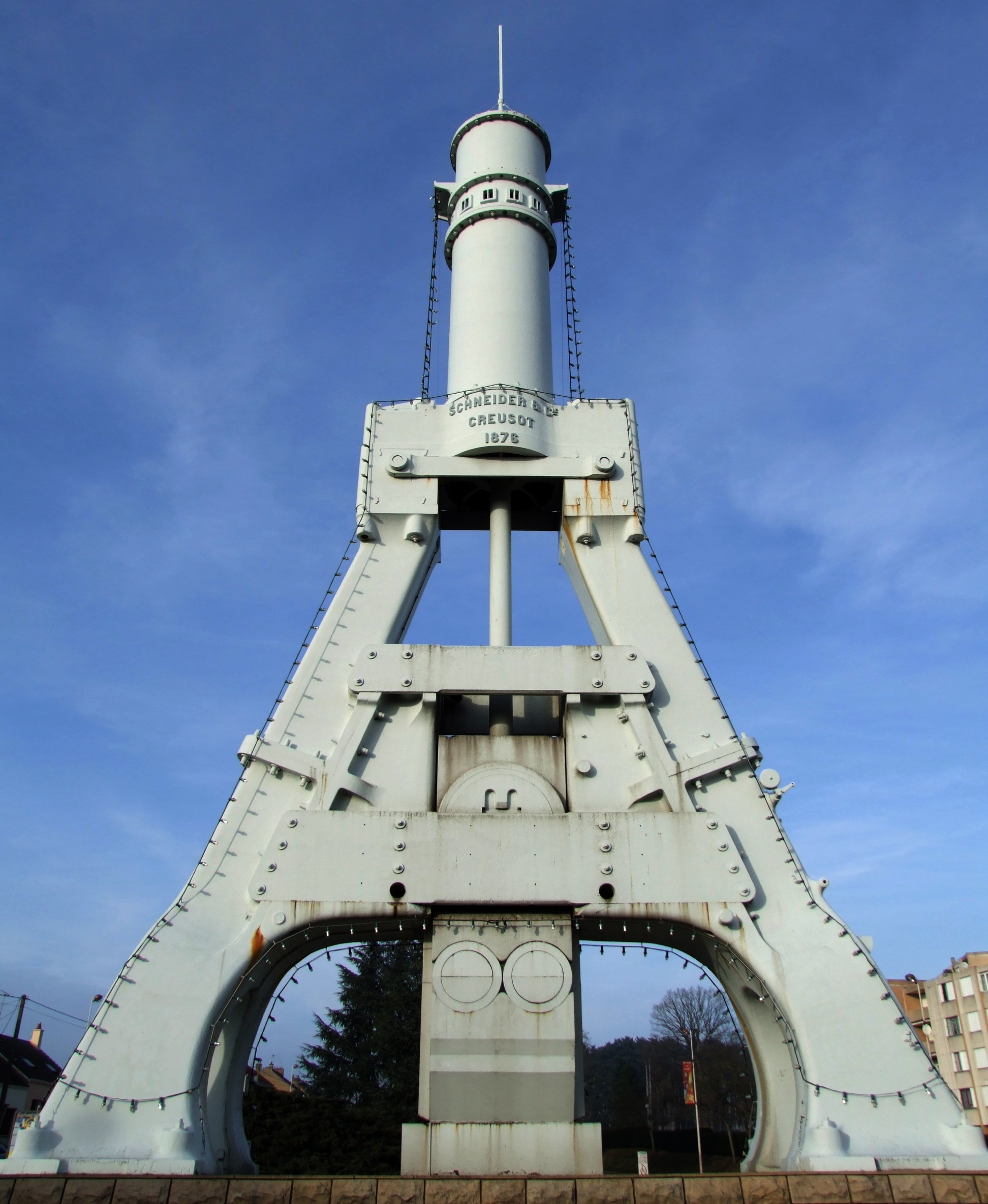
Creusot steam hammer in Le Creusot

The Creusot steam hammer is a giant steam hammer built in 1877 by Schneider and Co. in the French industrial town of Le Creusot. With the ability to deliver a blow of up to 100 tons, the Creusot hammer was the most powerful in the world until 1891, when the Bethlehem Iron Company of the United States purchased patent rights from Schneider and built a steam hammer of almost identical design but capable of delivering a 125-ton blow.

The Creusot hammer is no longer operational, and is a tourist attraction in the town of Le Creusot, where it was built. With few remaining rivals, the hammer today is once again the largest of its kind in the world.

The Creusot steam hammer was named a Historic Mechanical Engineering Landmark by the American Society of Mechanical Engineers in 1981.

== Origins ==
In 1836, Joseph Eugène Schneider and his brother Adolphe Schneider purchased a derelict ironworks in Burgundy, near the town of Le Creusot, and founded Schneider Brothers & Co. (later renamed Schneider & Co.). Two years later the company produced the first steam locomotive to be built in France. Eugène Schneider along with the company's chief engineer, François Bourdon, developed the world's first true steam hammer at the Schneider works in 1841. Schneider and Co. went on to build 110 steam hammers of all sizes between 1843 and 1867, 26 of which were employed by the firm itself. As the jobs grew more demanding, the hammers grew correspondingly larger, and the Schneiders eventually saw a need for a hammer of colossal proportions.

The Creusot steam hammer was completed in 1877, and with its ability to deliver a blow of up to 100 tons, eclipsed the previous record set by the German firm Krupp, whose steam hammer "Fritz", with its 50-ton blow, had held the title as the world's most powerful steam hammer since 1861. In celebration of this technological achievement, a full-scale wooden replica of the Creusot hammer was built and displayed at the Paris Universal Exposition of 1878.

== Description ==
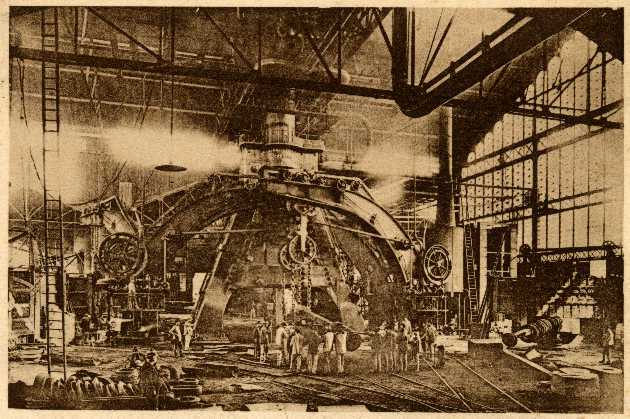
The Creusot steam hammer at work in its original location

The hammer is composed of four distinct parts — the foundation including the anvil, the legs, the steam cylinder and its valves and linkages, and finally, the active mass itself — the piston, piston rod, hammerhead and die.

The anvil weighed a massive 750 tons, and in order to support the weight and the hammer blows, the machine's foundations were built of solid masonry resting on bedrock 11 meters below the soil. A one-metre thick bed of oak timber topped the masonry foundation and provided the immediate floor for the giant anvil.

The four legs are hollow cast and rectangular in cross-section. They were originally bolted to plates embedded in the masonry. The legs are 10.25 meters high and connected to one another at the top in a rigid A-frame design by a 30-ton "table", that in its working life both guided the hammerhead and distributed the shock of its blows. One leg supports the operator's platform from which the machine was controlled.

The steam cylinder itself is 6 meters high and has an inside diameter of 1.9 meters. Steam pressure averaging 5 kg/cm^{2} or 71 psi drove the cylinder upwards through two balanced single-acting slide valves, after which the force of gravity would allow the hammer to fall and deliver a blow.

The piston had a maximum travel of 5 meters and the piston rod was 35 centimeters in diameter. The hammerhead or tup was interchangeable, with a number of differently shaped dies which may account for the hammer's reported variable force of between 75 and 100 tons. The actual energy delivered may have been in the order of 3.3 million foot-pounds (or 500,000 kilogram-metres).

Four separate furnaces provided steam power to four adjacent swan-necked cranes, which were used for manipulating the massive 120-ton iron and steel ingots delivered to the hammer for forging. Six Bessemer converters supplied the steel for the ingots, which were transported on a railway line built expressly for the purpose through the works.

For a comparison of scale, the world's largest modern hydraulic forging presses can apply force of about 80,000 tons.

=== Demonstrations ===
In its heyday, the hammer would sometimes give public demonstrations of its accuracy. It could be used to cork a bottle, crack a nut without damaging the contents, or tap a watch glass without breaking it. With such demonstrations, steam hammers for a time became symbols of industrial precision.

== Redundancy ==
Steam hammers were eventually made redundant with the introduction of hydraulic and mechanical steel presses, which could apply force more evenly and create better quality product. The giant American hammer built by Bethlehem Iron which had superseded the Creusot hammer in 1891 was demolished by 1902, but the Creusot hammer itself had a much longer service life, in use for 54 years until its final retirement in 1930.

== Tourist attraction ==
In 1969 the Creusot hammer was dismantled and reassembled in Le Creusot town square. Unfunctional, it serves as a tourist attraction and a reminder of a bygone era of technological achievement.

== Footnotes ==
Force: The figure for the 'actual force delivered', 3.3 million foot-pounds (or 500,000 kilogram-metres) was calculated by "multiplying the maximum weight of the falling mass by the length of its travel." All figures and units have been obtained from the reference, foot-pounds actually being a measure of work not force.
