= Low Moor Ironworks =

Defunct wrought iron foundry in Yorkshire, England

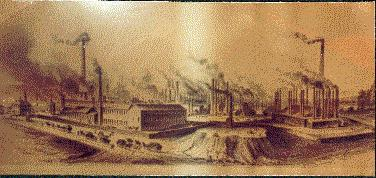
- The ironworks around 1855

- Low Moor in West Yorkshire
- Built: 13 August 1791
- Location: Low Moor, Bradford, England
- Coordinates: 53.752762°N 1.768988°W
- Industry: Ironworking
- Products: Wrought iron
- Defunct: 1920

The Low Moor Ironworks was a wrought iron foundry established in 1791 in the village of Low Moor about 3 miles (4.8 km) south of Bradford in Yorkshire, England. The works were built to exploit the high-quality iron ore and low-sulphur coal found in the area. Low Moor made wrought iron products from 1801 until 1957 for export around the world. At one time it was the largest ironworks in Yorkshire, a major complex of mines, piles of coal and ore, kilns, blast furnaces, forges and slag heaps connected by railway lines. The surrounding countryside was littered with waste, and smoke from the furnaces and machinery blackened the sky. Today Low Moor is still industrial, but the pollution has been mostly eliminated.

== Background ==
The ironworks depended on the excellent resources of high-quality coal and iron ore found in the vicinity. The "better bed" coal came from a seam about 18 to 28 inches (460 to 710 mm) thick resting on hard sandstone. This coal is particularly low in sulphur. About 120 feet (37 m) above this coal seam there is a layer of "black bed" coal. The ironstone lies above this layer, holding about 32% iron. The Halifax coal beds lie about 230 yards (210 m) below the better bed. At the time the ironworks were developed recent technological advances had made it practical to smelt iron using coal rather than charcoal and to use steam engines to power the steps in production of iron goods.

Most of the land occupied by the iron works was part of the Royds Hall estate. Operation of a coal mine on the estate is mentioned in 1673. In 1744 the owner, Edward Rookes Leeds, began to actively develop the coal mines. About 1780 a wooden railway was built from the Low Moor mines to the coal yard in the centre of Bradford, from where the coal could be carried via the Leeds and Liverpool Canal. Soon after, Leeds went bankrupt. The property was twice offered for sale by auction, in December 1786 and October 1787, but no suitable offer was made. Leeds committed suicide in 1787.

In 1788 the estate was sold to a partnership of Richard Hird, a country gentleman, John Preston and John Jarratt for £34,000. After some sales of shares the partners were Richard Hird, Joseph Dawson, (Note: Joseph Dawson came from a poor family, but was helped by a gentleman to attend school and then study at the University of Glasgow. He became a minister at Idle, West Yorkshire, a poorly paying position. To make ends meet he also worked as a farmer, teacher, doctor and coal-master. He invested his savings in the Low Moor ironworks, and became a wealthy man.) a minister, and John Hardy, a solicitor. Dawson was interested in metallurgy and chemistry and was a close friend of Dr. Joseph Priestley. He seems to have been the prime mover in the enterprise. The partners planned to found an ironworks, and engaged an engineer from Wigan named Smalley to build the blast engine. Smalley called on Thomas Woodcock to prepare plans for the furnaces, casting houses and other works. Woodcock moved to Low Moor, and was to be architect and general manager until his death in 1833.

== Expansion ==
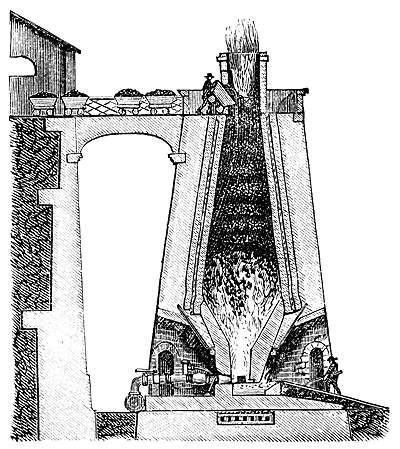
Blast furnace for production of pig iron. Later the Low Moor furnaces used self-tipping wagons to deliver ore, coke and limestone.

Construction of the plant began in June 1790, including blast furnaces and casting shops. The furnaces had square bases, tapering as they rose to about 50 feet (15 m) in height. The two furnaces were blown in on 13 August 1791 and the first casting was made by the forgemen three days later. At first the works produced domestic goods, but soon began producing industrial products including parts for steam engines. In 1795 the company won contracts to provide guns, shot and shells to the government, which had been at war with revolutionary France since 1793. By 1799 the works were producing about 2,000 tons of pig iron per year, from which iron goods were made that ranged from columns used in mill construction to garden furniture.

In 1800, the company opened the Barnby Furnace Colliery on land leased from Walter Spencer Stanhope. This mine worked the "Silkstone Seam". In 1802 the Low Moor Furnace Waggonway was constructed connecting the colliery to Barnby Basin on the Barnsley Canal. The colliery had closed by May 1807. The waggonway was replaced in 1809 by the Silkstone Waggonway which ran over much of its trackbed, and operated until 1870.

The ironworks were owned by the families of the founders throughout the 19th century, with the addition of the Wickhams, who married into the Hirds. The annually employed capital grew from £52,000 in 1793 to £250,000 in 1818. The company started to produce wrought iron in 1801, at first using imported iron but by 1803 using Low Moor pig iron. In 1803 a regiment of volunteers was formed at Low Moor ready to repel the expected French invasion. The works were gradually mechanised. By 1805 there was a self-tipping inclined railway to charge the furnaces, a nail slitting mill, two nose-helve hammers and a plate-rolling mill. As the iron works grew, the company built workers' cottages in the district that took the name of North Brierley and a hostel for the boys who worked in the pits. The boys were given free clothing and schooling. The company also ran several public houses.

By the end of the war with France in 1814 the works were producing 33 tons of pig iron weekly. Prices fell for a while as demand slackened after the war, but demand for gas pipes and street lights began to pick up in 1822. The Airedale poet John Nicholson wrote in 1829,

When first the shapeless sable ore
Is laid in heaps around Low Moor,
The roaring blast, the quiv'ring flame,
Give to the mass another name:
White as the sun the metal runs,
For horse-shoe nails, or thund'ring guns
...
No pen can write, no mind can soar
To tell the wonders of Low Moor.

By 1835 the works were handling a growing volume of orders. There was no room to expand in the original site, which was crowded by industrial works, offices and workers houses. Construction started on a new site to the southeast, and in 1836 two oven-topped blast furnaces came into operation there. In 1842 the company installed a new mill to roll iron plate for engine boilers. In 1843 four pairs of forge hammers were installed, driven by steam engines, and in 1844 the company decided to install one of James Nasmyth's newly invented steam hammers.

== Process ==
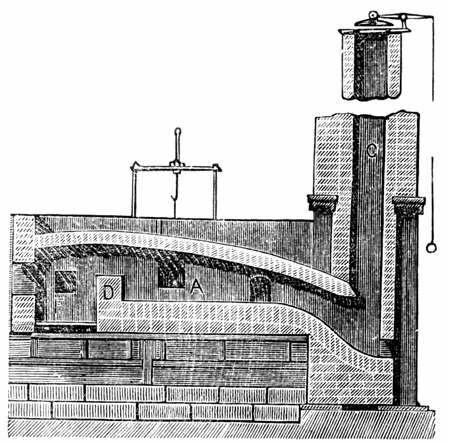
Puddling furnace (1881 illustration)

The process to convert ore into pig iron and then into wrought iron involved first converting the coal to coke to remove water and sulphur, a process that took 48 hours if done in piles in the yard, or 24 hours if done in ovens. About 32% of the better bed coal would be lost in coking. The ironstone was allowed to weather for some time to free it from shale. Limestone was brought from Skipton to help separate clay from the iron ore. In 1832 it took 9,750 pounds (4,420 kg) of coal, 2,800 pounds (1,300 kg) of limestone and 8,500 pounds (3,900 kg) of ironstone to make 2,240 pounds (1,020 kg) of pig iron.

The ironstone was baked with coke and limestone in a kiln, then emptied into a furnace, from which it came out as ore. This was cast into pigs with crystalline or granular structure, and then refined by cold blast, coming out flaky. There were four blast furnaces, with the air delivered by powerful steam engines. The iron was then puddled, becoming granular and malleable. The steam hammers forged the glowing iron into malleable slabs, which were rolled into wrought iron plates. Large quantities of slag from the blast furnaces were sold for use in road-making.

== Full production ==
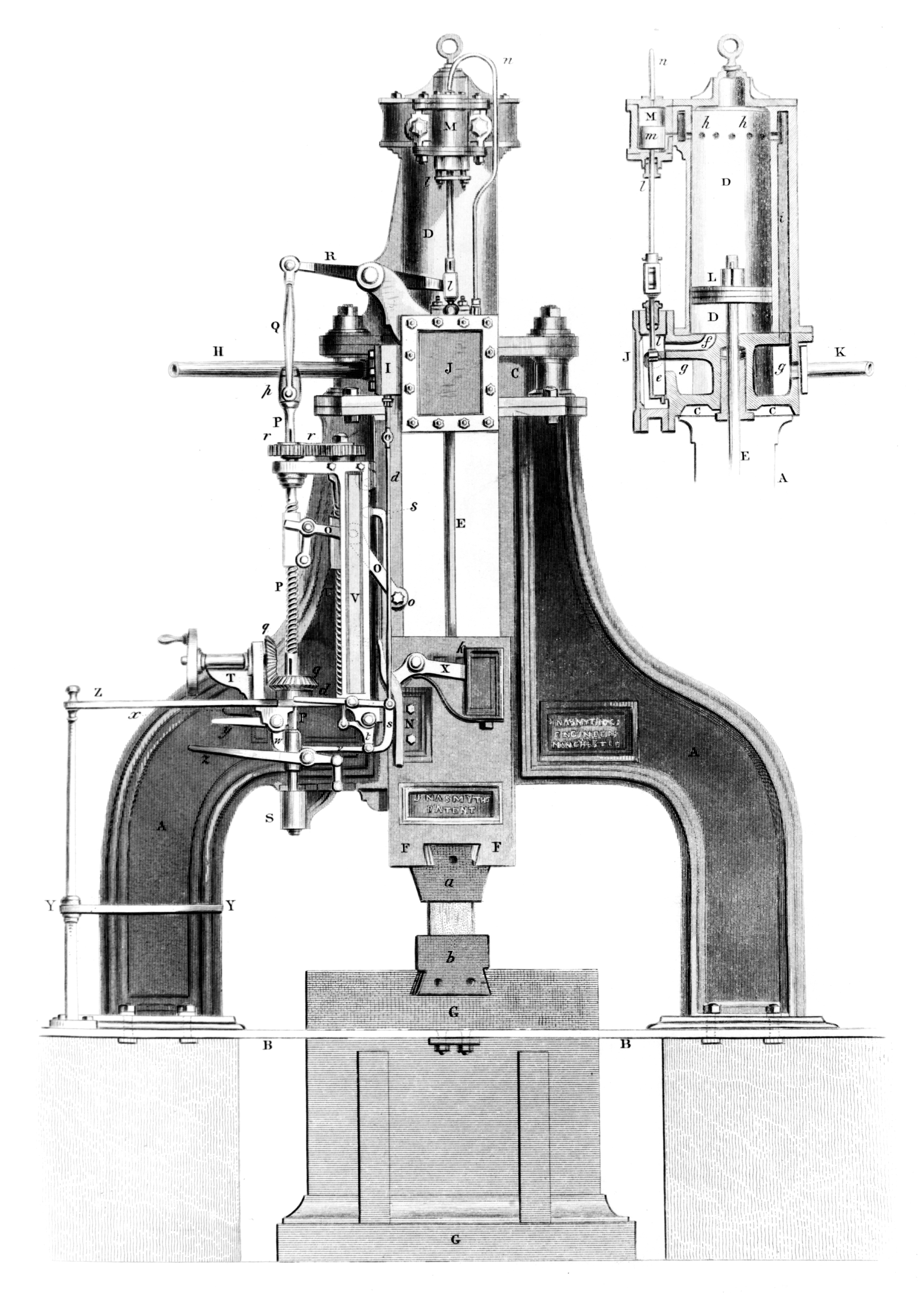
James Nasmyth's patent steam hammer

Robert Wilson, Works Manager at James Nasmyth's Bridgewater foundry in Patricroft near Manchester, had improved Nasmyth's 1842 design for a steam hammer, inventing the self-acting motion that made it possible to adjust the force of the blow delivered by the hammer – a critically important improvement. Nasmyth's steam hammers could now vary the force of the blow across a wide range. Nasmyth's first steam hammer was built for the Low Moor Works. They rejected the machine, but on 18 August 1843 accepted an improved version with a self-acting gear. From 1845 to 1856 Robert Wilson was employed by the Low Moor Ironworks. While at Low Moor he improved the steam hammer with the "circular balanced valve". In the Great Exhibition of 1851 at the Crystal Palace in London the ironworks exhibited an enormous cannon. The company also provided samples of ore, coal, pig iron and wrought iron, a smaller gun, a sugar cane mill, an olive mill and an elliptograph.

The Low Moor company bought the Bierley Ironworks in 1854. By 1855 Low Moor was producing 21,840 tons of iron per year, and was the largest ironworks in Yorkshire. The foundries at Low Moor produced quantities of guns, shells and shot for troops fighting in the Crimean War (1853–56) and the Indian Mutiny (1857–58). The arms business declined after this, as the government increasingly took charge of weapons production. The works turned to making weldless railway tyres, steam engine boilers, sugar pans for refineries in the West Indies, water pipes and heavy iron components for industrial purposes.

By 1863 there were 3,600 employees at the works including 1,993 miners, 420 furnacemen, 770 forgemen and 323 engineers. In 1864 a second steam hammer with an 8-ton ram was installed for heavy forgings. In 1871 a third steam hammer of 7 tons was installed. New rolling mills were also built to meet demand for iron plates in shipbuilding, supplied by slabs forged in the works. By 1867 there were about 4,000 employees. A description of the works at that time said

The accumulation of cinders and calcined shale actually overspreads the country, and will soon rival in cubic bulk the mass of the Pyramids. In some cases the hillocks of rubbish have been levelled, and covered with soil brought from a distance... Iron plates, bars and railway tires, sent to Russia, America, India, and, in fact, all over the world, are the principal manufactures here; but guns (from 32 to 68-pounders) are also made here... Every runlet of water for miles around is damned up to supply the works, and every drop is carefully economised. The great furnaces, with broad, flaring flames rising from them, of course attract attention as the works are approached. In form they resemble an ordinary lime-kiln, and, on the summit, in the midst of the eager flames, are strange-looking wheels–appendages of the machinery by means of which the ironstone and other matters are dragged up an inclined plane on iron waggons to the mouths of the furnaces, which waggons, self-acting, where no living power could perform the office, turn topsy-turvy, and there unload their contents.

In 1868 617,628 tons of Low Moor ironstone were raised, the peak production. In 1876 about 2,000 coal miners were employed in pits ranging in depth from 30 to 150 yards (27 to 137 m) in the surrounding townships of North Bierley, Tong, Bowling, Shelf, Wyke, Clifton, Hipperholme and Cleckheaton. Thirteen pumping engines were used to drain water from the mines. The company also employed about 800 miners in collieries to the east at Beeston, Churwell, Osmondthorpe and Potternewton, near Leeds. Minerals were carried to the works by horse-drawn wagons or by wagons on tramways drawn by stationary engines.

The Low Moor mines produced about 60,000 tons of ore yearly by 1876. The iron was prized for its uniform and brilliant grain, commanding premium prices. The quality seemed to be due in part to the nature of the ore and coal and in part to the manufacturing process. Production came at the cost of aesthetics. An 1876 description said "the natural effect of the perpetual smoke-canopy under which the vegetation of the district exists is to give to it a dinginess not pleasant to look upon... The appearance created by the works themselves and their surroundings has been not inaptly likened to that in the vicinity of the crater of some volcano."

== Decline ==
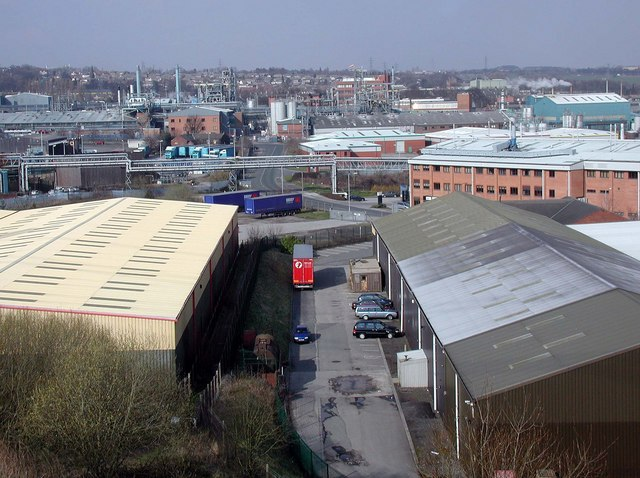
Low Moor industrial area in 2007

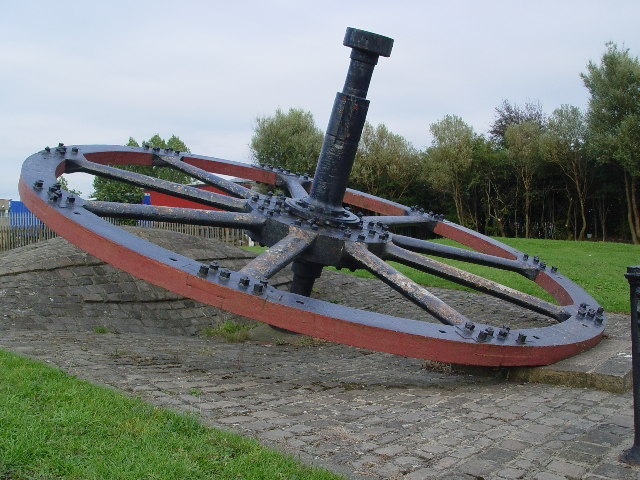
Monument to the Low Moor Iron Works

The company began to run into difficulty in the late 1880s. Its mines were increasingly scattered and expensive. The rail network had a variety of gauges and used a mix of stationary engines and locomotives. Some of the plant was obsolete and operations were generally inefficient. However, there was continued demand for "Best Yorkshire Iron" for applications where safety was critically important. In 1888 Low Moor was converted to a limited liability company, although descendants of the founders retained control. The directors planned two new blast furnaces at the New Works, each 70 feet (21 m) high, with capacities of 340 and 240 tons per week. The first came into operation in 1892. In 1905 an electrical power station was built at the New Works, with boilers fired by gas from the blast furnaces. Apart from the heaviest machines, steam drives were replaced by electrical drives. The outbreak of World War I (1914–1918) caused a temporary surge in demand for shell casings and drop forgings, including shoes for the tracks of the first tanks.

After the war it was clear that future demand for wrought iron was uncertain. The company was taken over by Robert Heath & Sons of Staffordshire, creating a new company called Robert Heath And Low Moor Ltd. Efforts were made to reduce costs, although this affected quality. Attempts to use high-sulphur coal created serious problems and destroyed the reputation of the works as a supplier of high quality iron, while a slump in heavy industry in the 1920s further reduced demand. The company poured money into attempts to diversify the operations, but did not succeed. In 1928 the company was declared bankrupt, and the Low Moor assets bought by Thos. W. Ward Ltd. Many of the mines, tracks and plant were closed or dismantled. Some buildings were sold or leased to other companies, and some plant was modernised. Wrought iron production finally ended in 1957. As of 1971 new owners were producing alloy steel, making about 350 tons per week.
