= François Bourdon =

French engineer and inventor

François Prudent Bourdon
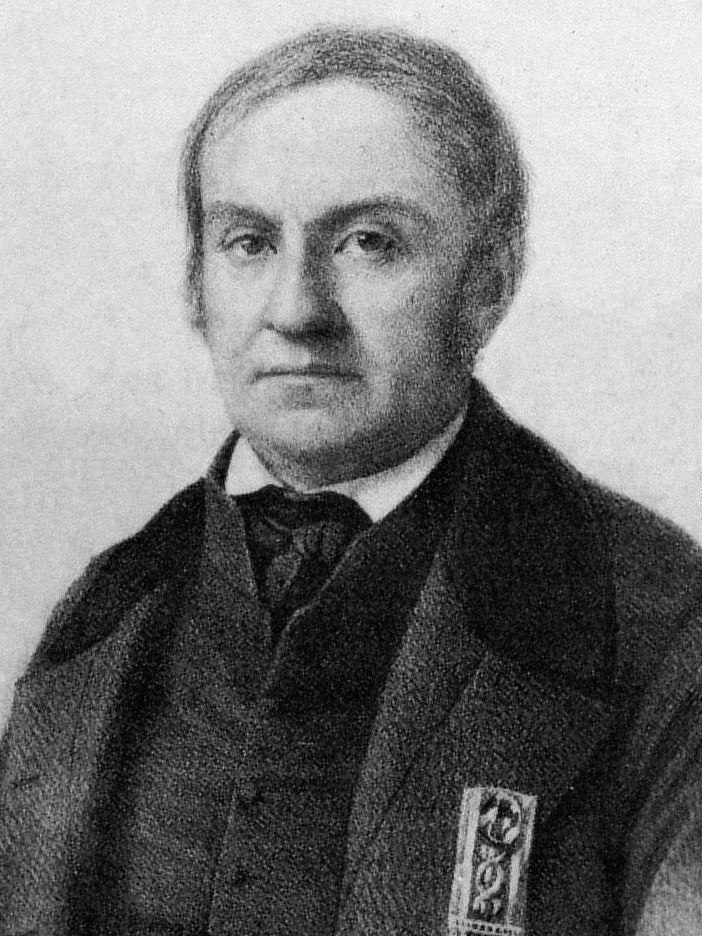
- François Bourdon
- Born: 29 July 1797; Seurre, Côte-d'Or, France
- Died: 19 April 1865 (aged 67); Paris, France
- Occupations: Engineer, inventor
- Known for: Steam hammer

François Prudent Bourdon (29 July 1797 – 19 April 1865) was a French engineer and inventor, mainly interested in development of steam-powered boats for inland navigation. He is known for designing one of the first steam hammers.

== Early years ==
François Prudent Bourdon was born at Seurre in the Côte-d'Or department of France on 29 July 1797. He was educated in the college of Mâcon. His father owned mills and river boats in Mâcon, and François joined his business after leaving school. After several year, François Bourdon and his younger brother founded a workshop. At Saint-Laurent-sur-Saône, a town opposite Mâcon, Francois and his brother Auguste ran an establishment whose main purpose was steam-powered wheat milling.

In 1824 Bourdon took out a patent for a new tugboat design. In 1824 at Lyon, on the Saône between la Mulatière and the île Barbe, Bourdon made several attempts at steam-powered towing. He ran into various difficulties, mostly not technical. Bourdon's first two boats, Océan and Méditerranée, were built at Saint-Laurent-sur-Saône in 1825–26. The two boats were both steam-powered, and both had two 20 hp engines. They had shallow drafts, so could navigate the river most of the year if the river were dredged. Bourdon had a vision of the Saône becoming the key link in a water route from the Mediterranean via the Rhone to Lyon, then north via the Saône towards a network of canals that would connect to the Loire and the Rhine. In 1826 Bourdon created a company for steam navigation of the Saône, but it was short-lived.

== Le Creusot ==
In 1826 the English partners Manby and Wilson acquired the iron forging mills at Le Creusot in 1826. They employed Bourdon from 1827 to 1833 to run the workshop for maintaining the forges and tools. Bourdon's first job was to modernize the works by installing the high-powered rolling mills needed to manufacture long lengths of rail for the railway lines in France. In 1833 Bourdon traveled to the United States for three years to study the high-pressure steam engines used on the river boats there, including the engines built by the American engineer Oliver Evans. He learned many techniques during this trip.

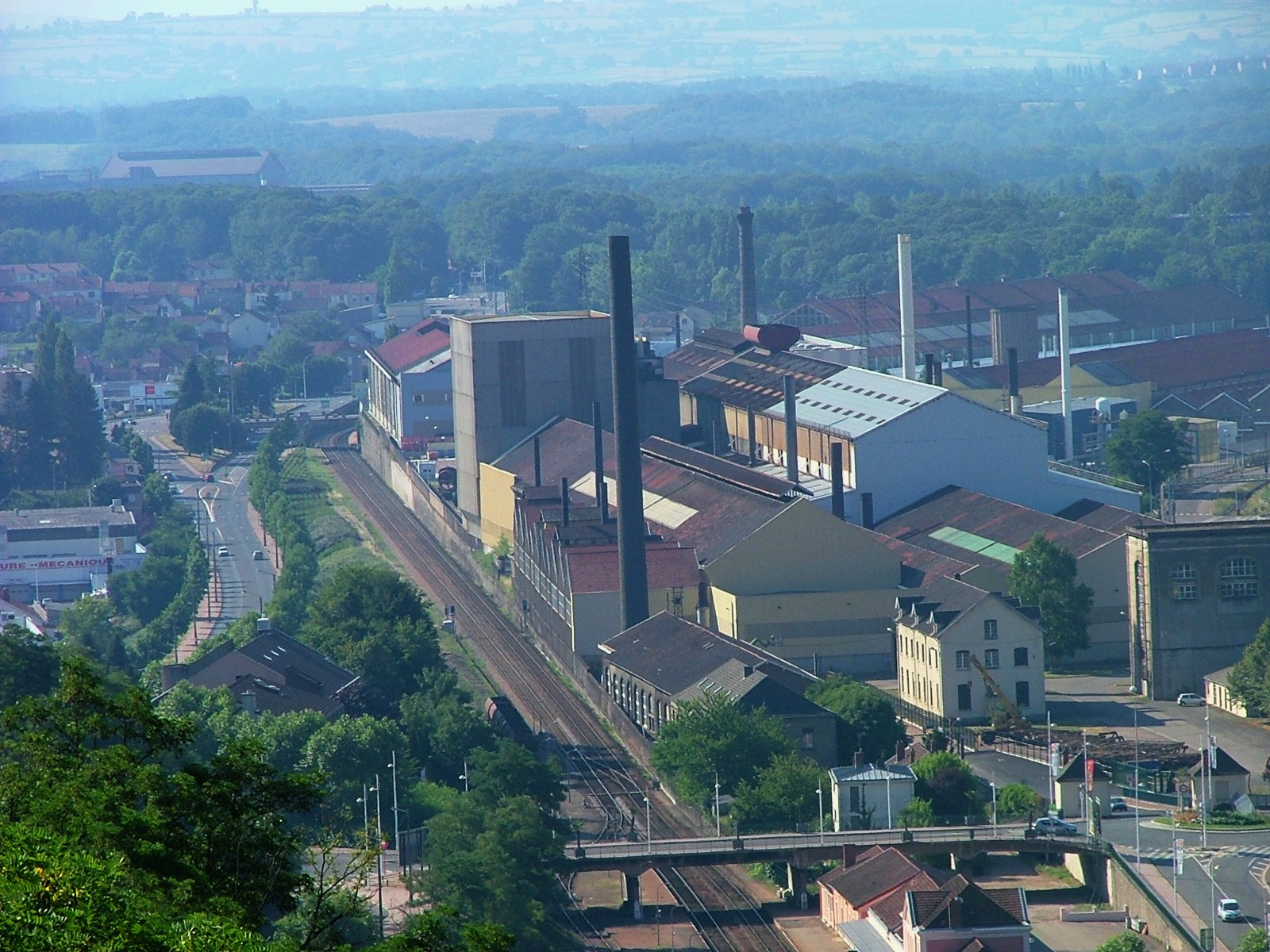
Works at Le Creusot in 2005

In 1836 the brothers Adolphe and Eugène Schneider acquired the works at Le Creusot with investments by François Alexandre Seillière and Louis Boigues. They hired Bourdon in March 1837 to modernize the plant, which had been idle for three years, and to run the mechanical engineering workshops. He was able to devote his time to his passion for mechanical invention and steam navigation. Bourdon built many boats for use on the Rhone and built the first French transatlantic iron boats. He was responsible for building le Crocodile, le Marsouin (1839), le Mistral (1840), le Siroco (1840), la Foudre and l'Ouragan (1841–42).

The Citis was built at Pont sur l'Ognon on the Saône and completed at the Schneider factory at Chalon-sur-Saône. During its trials on 17 January 1841 the boiler exploded in the presence of Eugène Schneider, François Bourdon and his father-in-law Antoine Henri Pognon, mayor of Creusot and chief accountant of the works. Nine people died including Pognon, and many were injured. The accident was used in a campaign against the Creusot works by rivals who were interested in importing machinery from England. In 1843-44 Bourdon made five large river cargo boats, Creusot, Mississippi, Missouri, Althen and Talabot. Each of these modern-looking steam-powered boats was 75 metres (246 ft) or more in length, but no more than 6.3 metres (21 ft) in width. In 1848 he conceived the giants Océan and Méditerranée.

Bourdon developed designs for hauling boats up an inclined plane. He designed a complete set of tools for construction of locomotives, and developed techniques for shaping iron components using a hydraulic press.

== Steam hammer ==
The SS Sirius was the first steamboat to cross the Atlantic, in 1838, closely followed by the 72 metres (236 ft) paddleboat SS Great Western, which began regular crossings. In 1840, a French law authorized construction of 18 similar trans-Atlantic steamers. The Schneiders won orders to build 450-horsepower steam engines to power four of them. A new type of hammer was needed for industrial production of the large forgings needed in these engines.

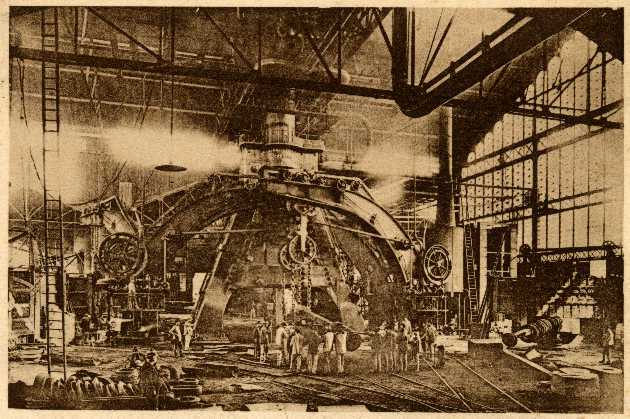
The Creusot steam hammer of 1877, a huge hammer with a design evolved from Bourdon's original

François Bourdon is best known for his invention of the steam hammer, an idea that is also attributed to the Scottish engineer James Nasmyth. In 1839, Bourdon conceived of the idea of directly attaching a mass of iron to the piston rod of a steam engine. Bourdon called his engine a Pilon and made detailed drawings of his design that he showed to all engineers who visited the works at Le Creusot. Around the same time, Nasmyth was faced with the problem of forging a 30 inches (760 mm) diameter shaft for a paddle steamer, larger than any that had been previously made. He came up with his own steam hammer design, making a sketch dated 24 November 1839, but the immediate need disappeared when the practicality of screw propellers was demonstrated. Nasmyth also showed his design to all visitors.

The Schneiders hesitated to build Bourdon's radical new machine. Bourdon and Eugène Schneider visited the Nasmyth works in England in the middle of 1840, where they were shown Nasmyth's sketch. Bourdon pointed out how he had solved some problems in his somewhat different design, leaving a sketch of it. Schneider saw the two leading engineers agreed that such a machine was practical and authorized construction. The first steam hammer in the world was built at Le Creusot in 1840. It weighed 2,500 kilograms (5,500 lb) and lifted to 2 metres (6 ft 7 in). Bourdon filed the patent for the machine on 30 September 1841 and Schneider frères et Cie took out the definitive patent on 19 April 1842.

Bourdon's machine had been operating for fifteen months when Nasmyth visited the Creusot works in April 1842 and saw it in action. Nasmyth's first steam hammer was built later that year after his return to England. In 1843' a dispute broke out between Nasmyth and Bourdon over priority of invention of the steam hammer. Nasmyth, an excellent publicist, managed to convince many people that he was the first. He would attend opening ceremonies for his hammers, and would demonstrate that they were so finely machined that it could crack the top of an egg sitting in a wine glass. However, it is clear that both men had invented the steam hammer independently, both trying to solve the same problem of forging shafts and cranks for the increasingly large steam engines used in locomotives and paddle boats.

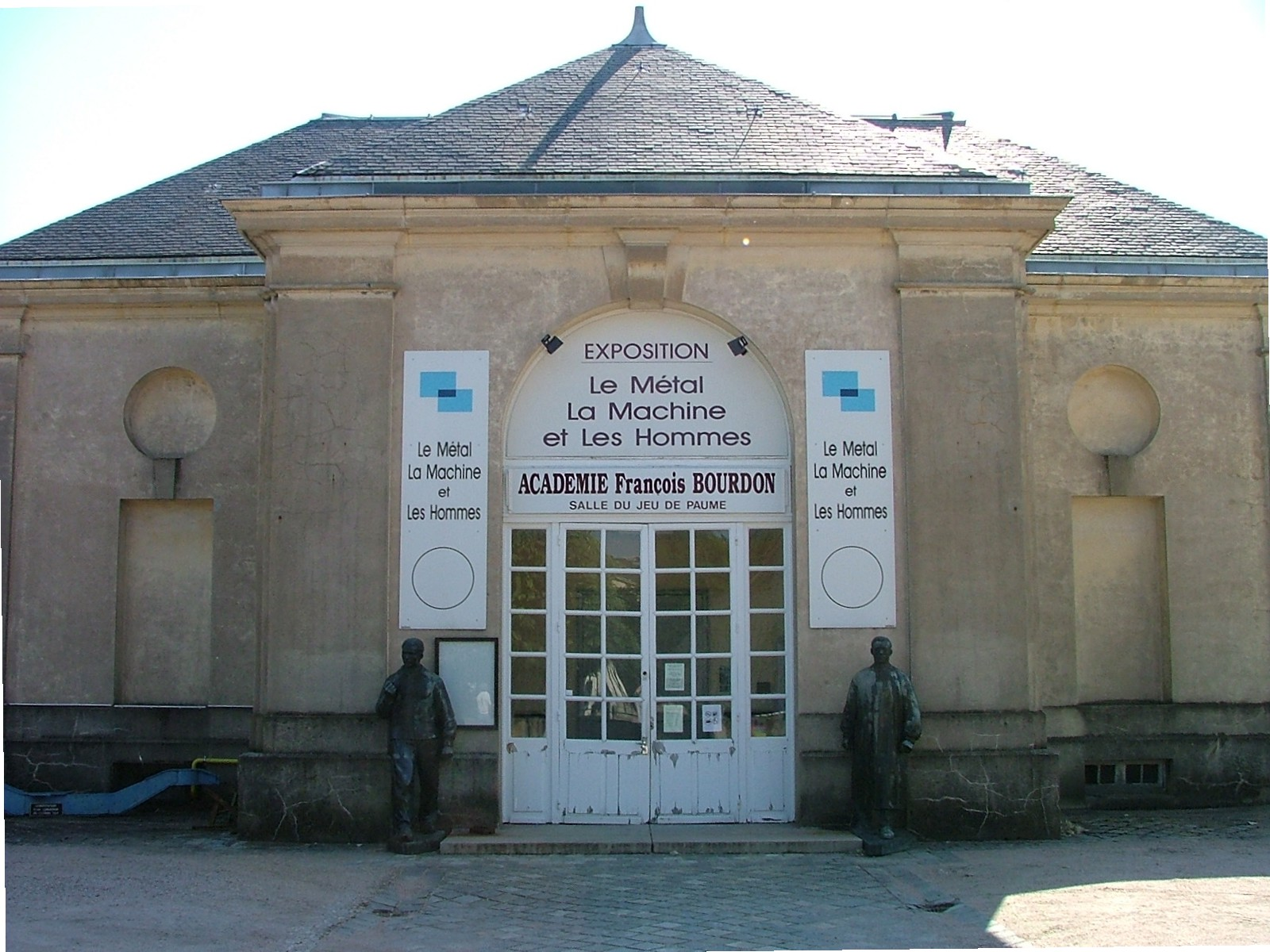
Exhibition "Metal, Machine and Men" created by the François Bourdon Académie in the town of Le Creusot

== Later career ==
Bourdon began a fertile collaboration with his contemporary, the engineer Claude Verpilleux (1798-1875 ). During the French Revolution of 1848 both were elected to the constitutional assembly, although neither had the personalities for a career in politics. Bourdon was elected representative of Saône-et-Loire on 23 April 1848. He sat with the very moderate Republicans, supporters of General Louis-Eugène Cavaignac.

In 1853 Bourdon became director of the Forges et chantiers de la Méditerranée (Mediterranean Forges and Factories). He built several machines for commercial boats and warships. He installed a large hydraulic machine at the Marseille docks designed by George Armstrong, the famous English engineer, among other works.

François Prudent Bourdon died in Paris on 19 April 1865.

== Sources ==
- Boutany (1885). "Who Invented the Steam Hammer?". Engineering News-record. McGraw-Hill.
- Chomienne, C. (1888). "Notes on Steam Hammers". Railway Locomotives and Cars. Simmons-Boardman Publishing Corporation.
- Combe, Jean-Marc; Escudié, Bernard; Payen, Jacques (1991). Vapeurs sur le Rhône: histoire scientifique et technique de la navigation à vapeur de Lyon à la mer. Presses Universitaires Lyon. ISBN 978-2-7297-0400-1.
- D'Angio, Agnès (2006). "The industrial and financial use of patents by Schneider et Cie". Transferts de technologies en Méditerranée. Presses Paris Sorbonne. ISBN 978-2-84050-374-3.
- "François BOURDON". Archives Départementales numérisées de la Côte d’Or.
- "François, Prudent BOURDON". Base de données des députés français depuis 1789. l'Assemblée nationale de France.
- "Nasmyth steam hammer, c.1850". The Science Museum.
