= Steam hammer =

Power hammer

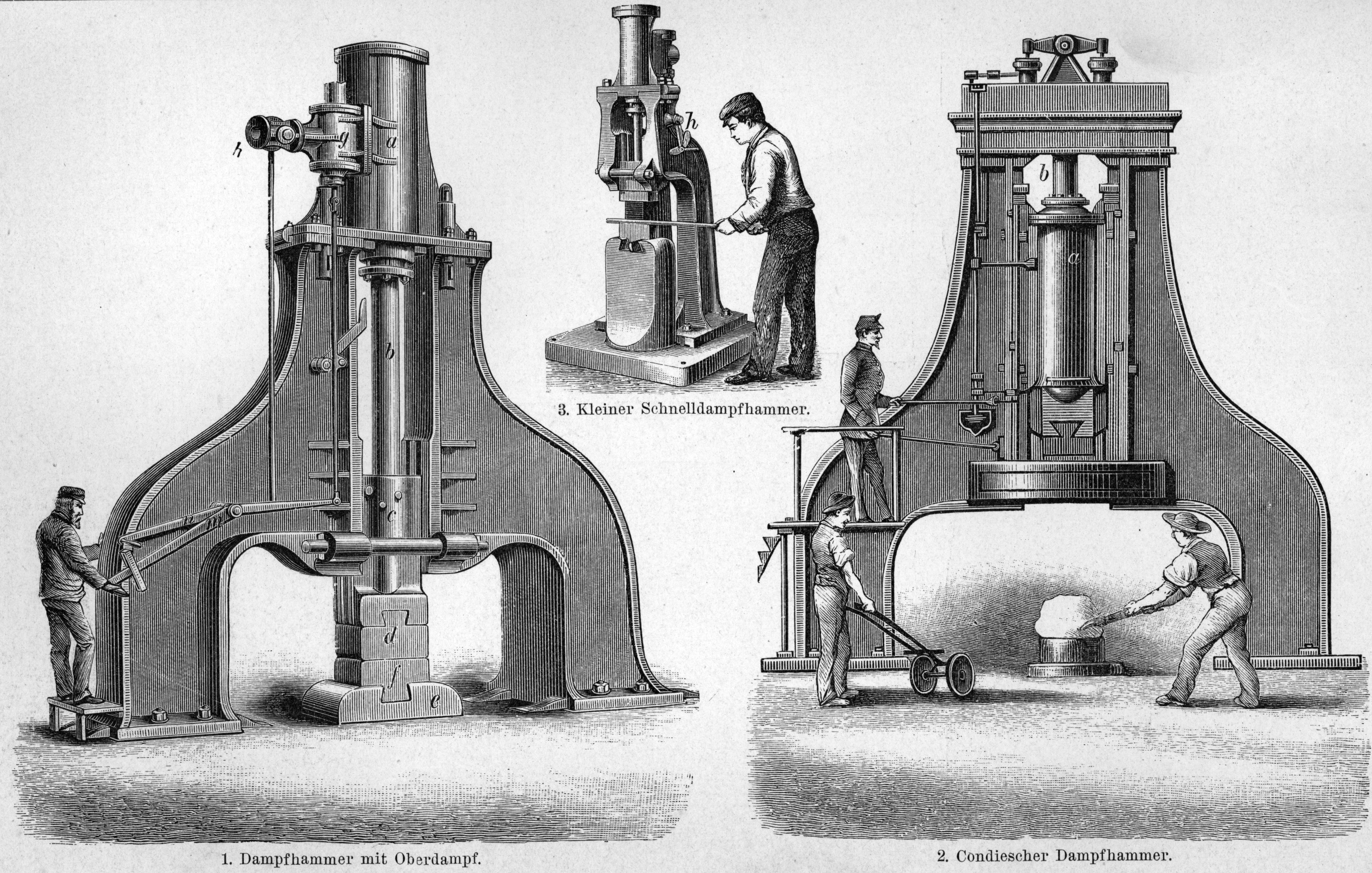
- 1894 illustration of various sizes of single- and double-frame steam hammer
- Industry: Metal working
- Application: Forging, pile driving, riveting etc.
- Fuel source: Wood or coal
- Inventor: François Bourdon, James Nasmyth
- Invented: 1839

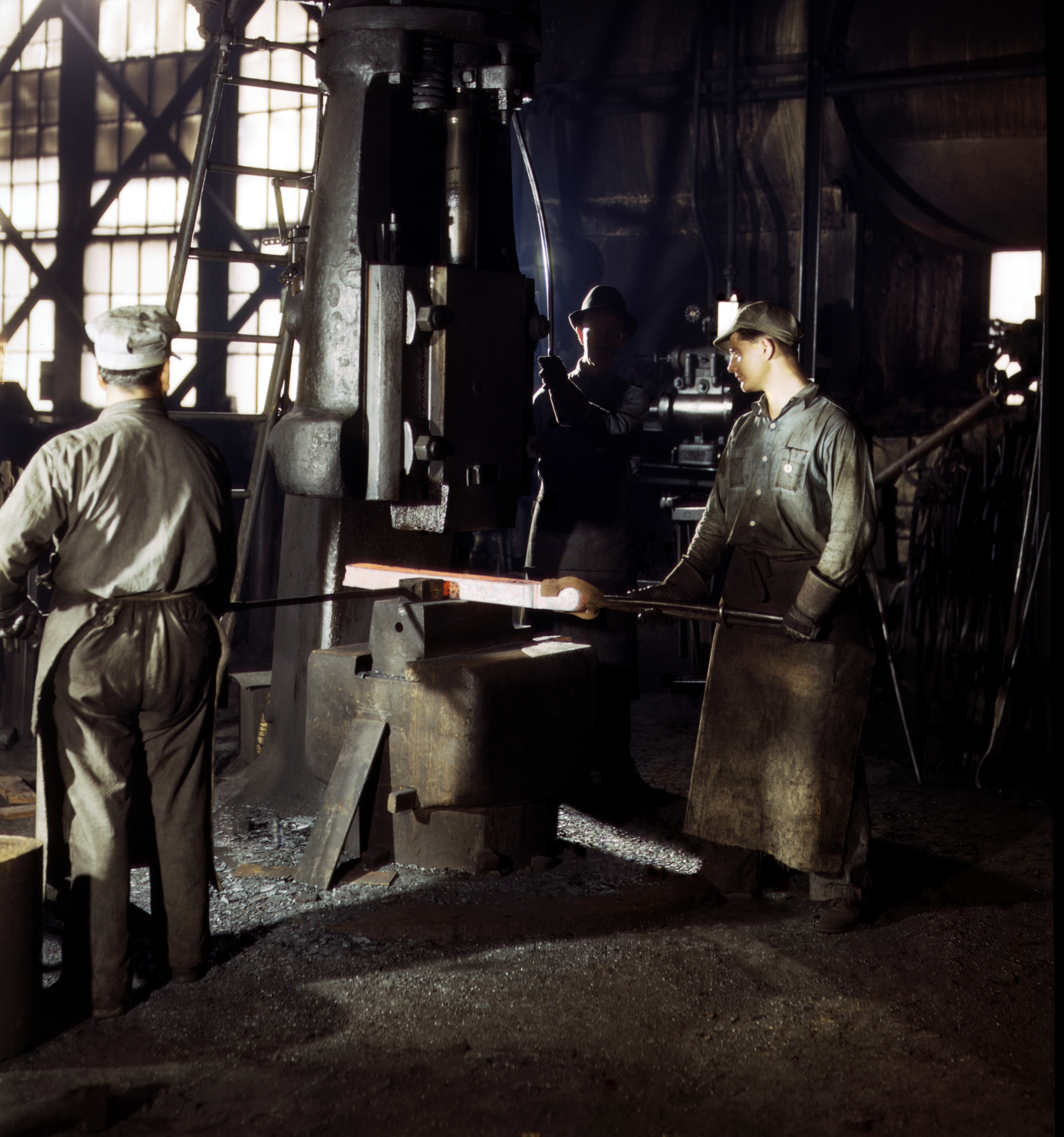
A single-frame steam drop hammer in use at the Atchison, Topeka and Santa Fe Railway shops in Topeka, Kansas, 1943

A steam hammer, also called a drop hammer, is an industrial power hammer driven by steam that is used for tasks such as shaping forgings and driving piles. Typically the hammer is attached to a piston that slides within a fixed cylinder, but in some designs the hammer is attached to a cylinder that slides along a fixed piston.

The concept of the steam hammer was described by James Watt in 1784, but it was not until 1840 that the first working steam hammer was built to meet the needs of forging increasingly large iron or steel components. In 1843 there was an acrimonious dispute between François Bourdon of France and James Nasmyth of Britain over who had invented the machine. Bourdon had built the first working machine, but Nasmyth claimed it was built from a copy of his design.

Steam hammers proved to be invaluable in many industrial processes. Technical improvements gave greater control over the force delivered, greater longevity, greater efficiency and greater power. A steam hammer built in 1891 by the Bethlehem Iron Company delivered a 125-ton blow. In the 20th century steam hammers were gradually displaced in forging by mechanical and hydraulic presses, but some are still in use. Compressed air power hammers, descendants of the early steam hammers, are still manufactured.

== Mechanism ==
A single-acting steam hammer is raised by the pressure of steam injected into the lower part of a cylinder and drops under gravity when the pressure is released. With the more common double-acting steam hammer, steam is also used to push the ram down, giving a more powerful blow at the die. The weight of the ram may range from 225 to 22,500 kg (500 to 50,000 lb). The piece being worked is placed between a bottom die resting on an anvil block and a top die attached to the ram (hammer).

Hammers are subject to repeated concussion, which could cause fracturing of cast iron components. The early hammers were therefore made from a number of parts bolted together, which made it cheaper to replace broken parts, and also gave it a degree of elasticity that made fractures less likely.

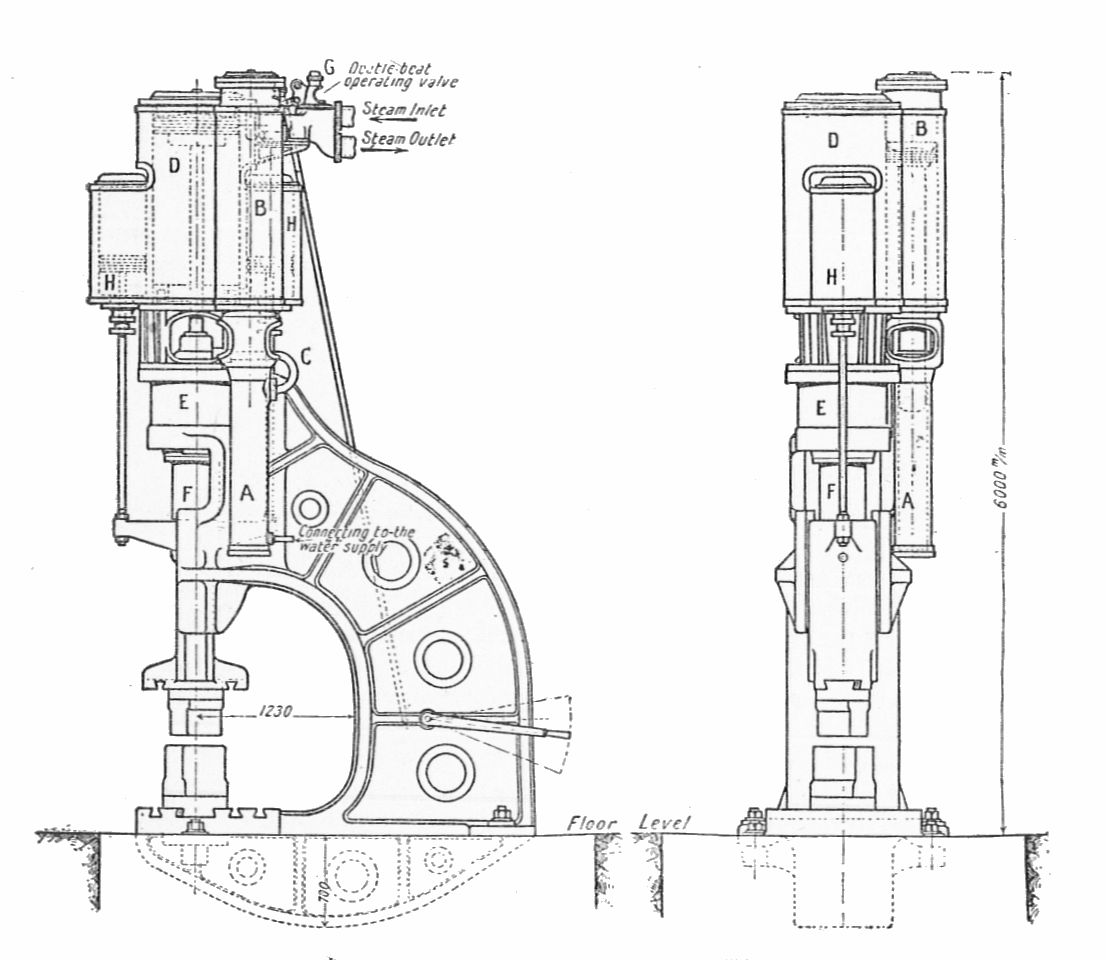
A single-frame double-acting steam hammer

A steam hammer may have one or two supporting frames. The single frame design lets the operator move around the dies more easily, while the double frame can support a more powerful hammer. The frame(s) and the anvil block are mounted on wooden beams that protect the concrete foundations by absorbing the shock.

Deep foundations are needed, but a large steam drop hammer will still shake the building that holds it. This may be solved with a counterblow steam hammer, in which two converging rams drive the top and bottom dies together. The upper ram is driven down and the lower ram is pulled or driven up. These hammers produce a large impact and can make large forgings. They can be installed with smaller foundations than anvil hammers of similar force. Counterblow hammers are not often used in the United States, but are common in Europe.

With some early steam hammers an operator moved the valves by hand, controlling each blow. With others the valve action was automatic, allowing for rapid repetitive hammering. Automatic hammers could give an elastic blow, where steam cushioned the piston towards the end of the down stroke, or a dead blow with no cushioning. The elastic blow gave a quicker rate of hammering, but less force than the dead blow. Machines were built that could run in either mode according to the job requirement. The force of the blow could be controlled by varying the amount of steam introduced to cushion the blow. A modern air/steam hammer can deliver up to 300 blows per minute.

== History ==
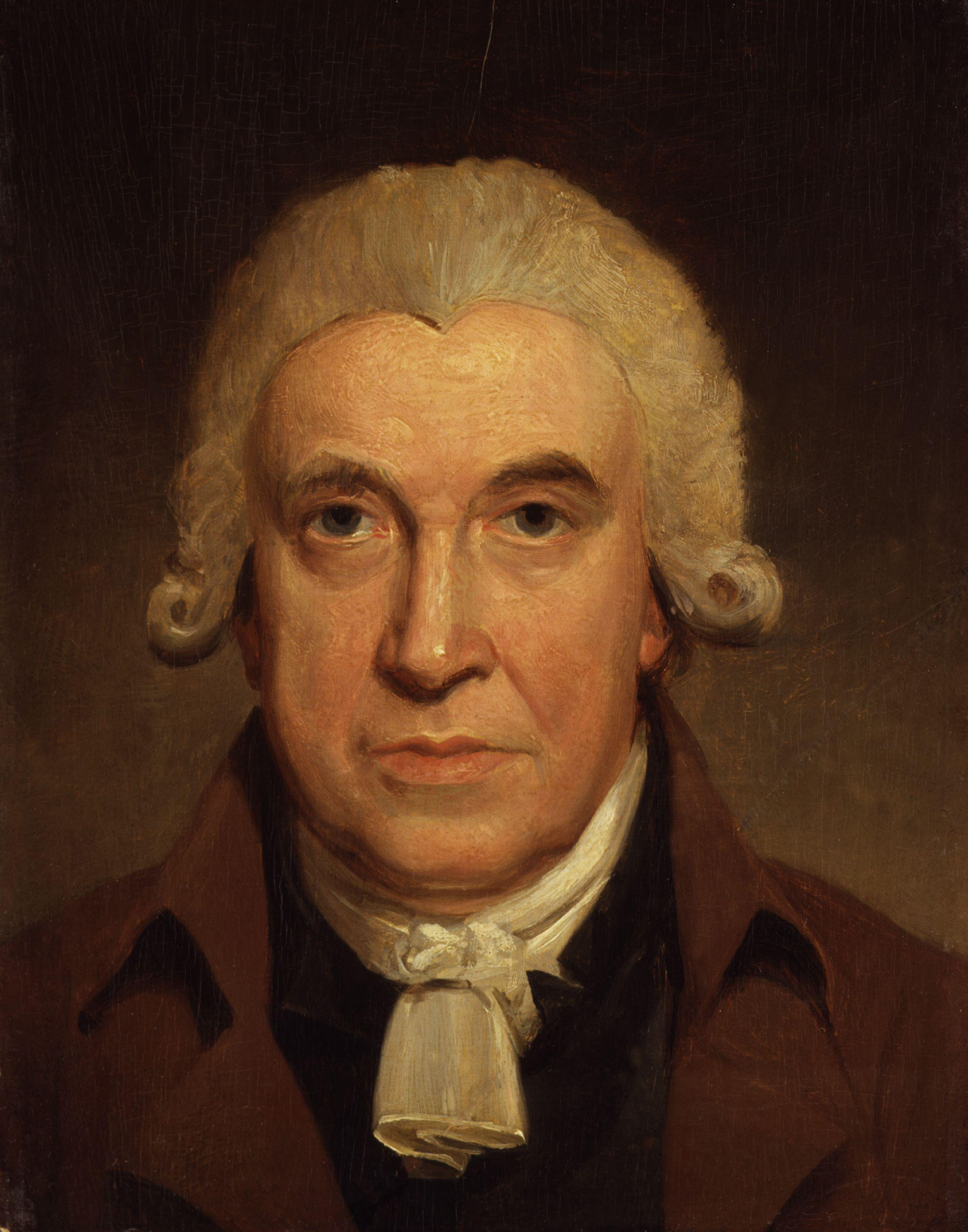
James Watt (1736–1819) described the concept of a steam hammer

=== Concept ===
The possibility of a steam hammer was noted by James Watt (1736–1819) in his 28 April 1784 patent for an improved steam engine. Watt described "Heavy Hammers or Stampers, for forging or stamping iron, copper, or other metals, or other matters without the intervention of rotative motions or wheels, by fixing the Hammer or Stamper to be so worked, either directly to the piston or piston rod of the engine." Watt's design had the cylinder at one end of a wooden beam and the hammer at the other. The hammer did not move vertically, but in the arc of a circle. On 6 June 1806 W. Deverell, engineer of Surrey, filed a patent for a steam-powered hammer or stamper. The hammer would be welded to a piston rod contained in a cylinder. Steam from a boiler would be let in under the piston, raising it and compressing the air above it. The steam would then be released and the compressed air would force the piston down.

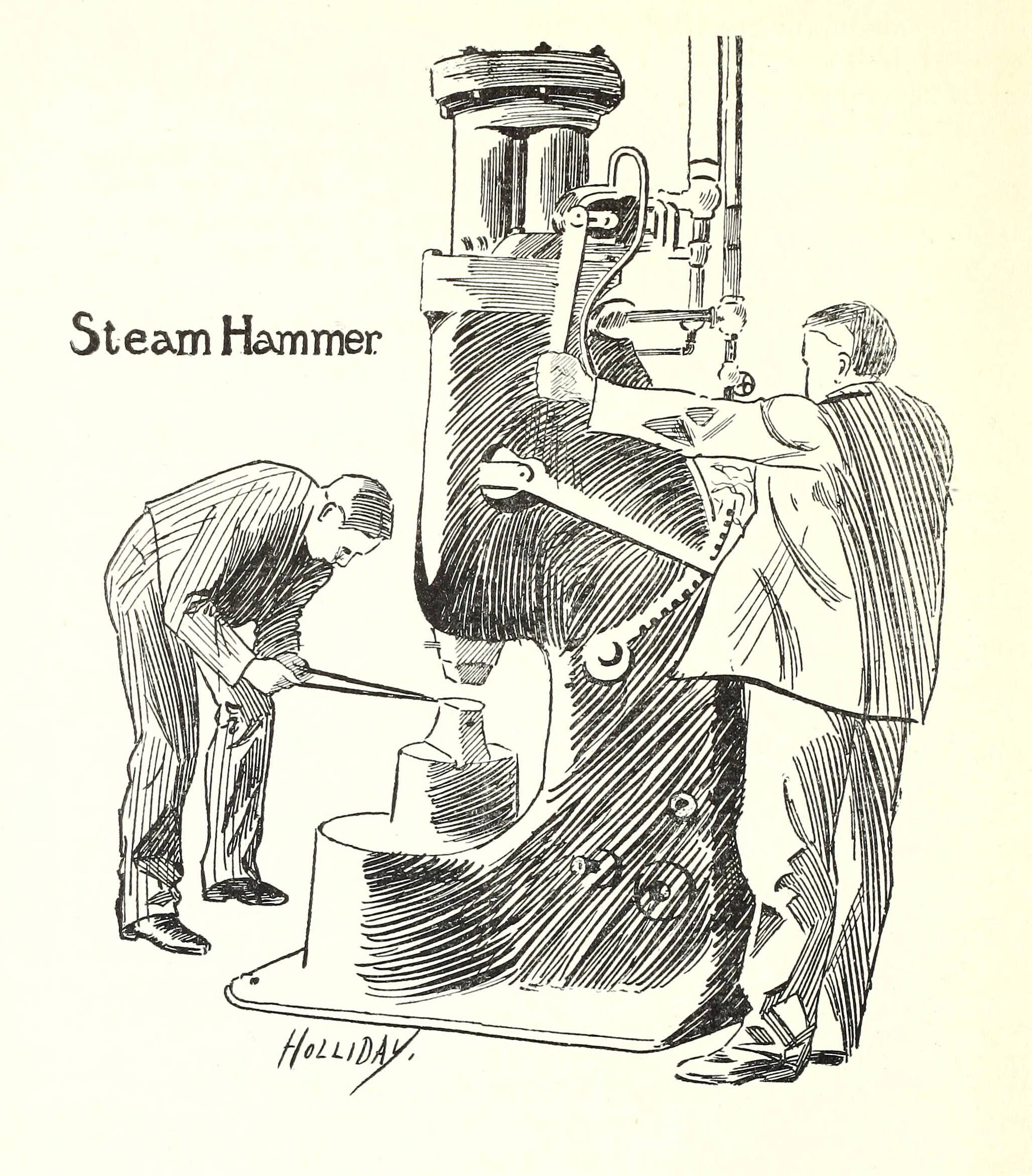
1899 Drawing of Steam Hammer

In August 1827 John Hague was awarded a patent for a method of working cranes and tilt-hammers driven by a piston in an oscillating cylinder where air power supplied the motive force. A partial vacuum was made in one end of a long cylinder by an air pump worked by a steam engine or some other power source, and atmospheric pressure drove the piston into that end of the cylinder. When a valve was reversed, the vacuum was formed in the other end and the piston forced in the opposite direction. Hague made a hammer to this design for planishing frying pans. Many years later, when discussing the advantages of air over steam for delivering power, it was recalled that Hague's air hammer "worked with such an extraordinary rapidity that it was impossible to see where the hammer was in working, and the effect was seemed more like giving one continuous pressure." However, it was not possible to regulate the force of the blows.

=== Invention ===
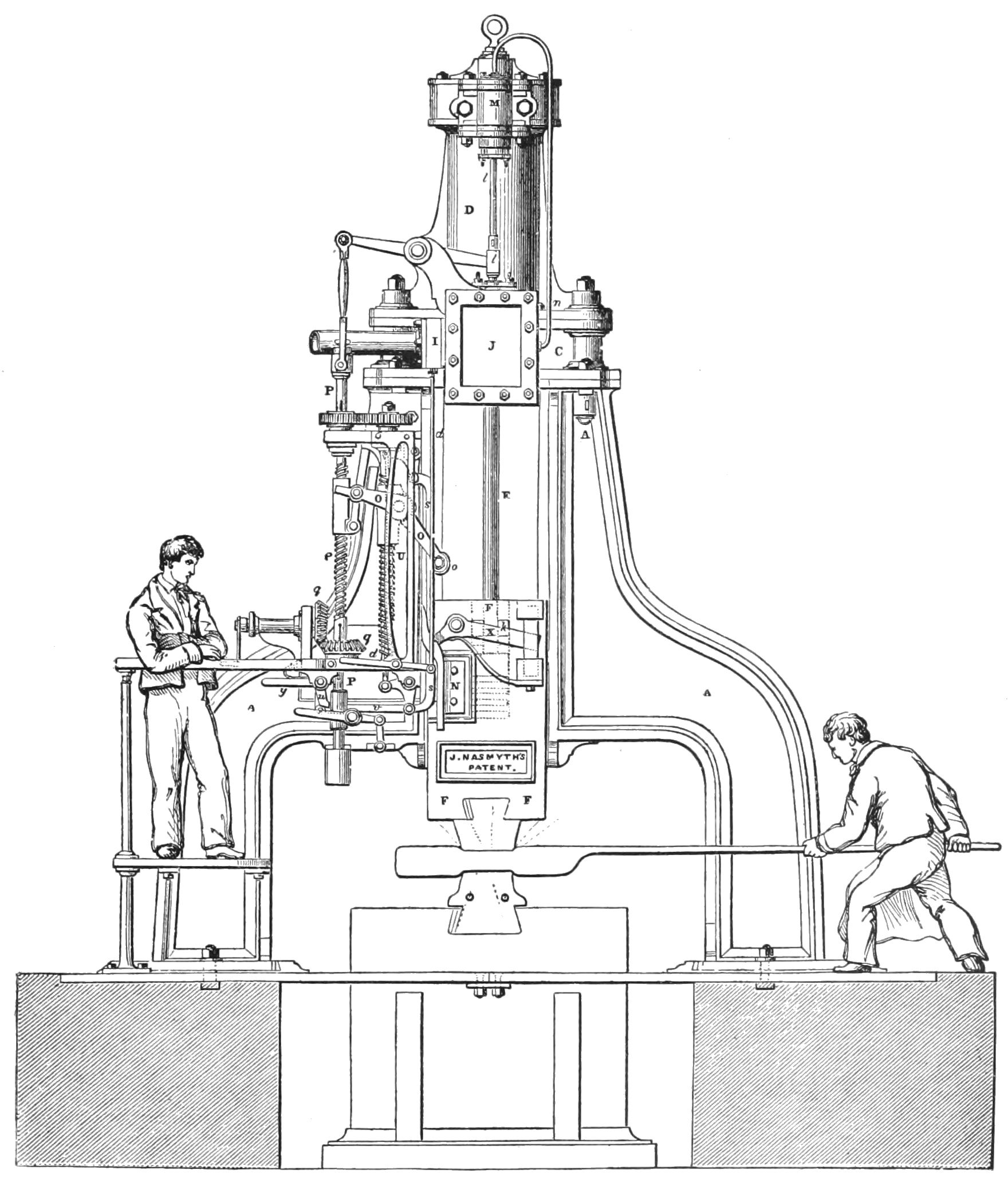
The Nasmyth steam hammer

It seems probable that the Scottish engineer James Nasmyth (1808–1890) and his French counterpart François Bourdon (1797–1865) reinvented the steam hammer independently in 1839, both trying to solve the same problem of forging shafts and cranks for the increasingly large steam engines used in locomotives and paddle boats. An 1847 report suggests the inventor to have been the American Lewis Kirk, however. In Nasmyth's 1883 "autobiography", written by Samuel Smiles, he described how the need arose for a paddle shaft for Isambard Kingdom Brunel's new transatlantic steamer SS Great Britain, with a 30 inches (760 mm) diameter shaft, larger than any that had been previously forged. He came up with his steam hammer design, making a sketch dated 24 November 1839, but the immediate need disappeared when the practicality of screw propellers was demonstrated and the Great Britain was converted to that design. Nasmyth showed his design to all visitors.

Bourdon came up with the idea of what he called a "Pilon" in 1839 and made detailed drawings of his design, which he also showed to all engineers who visited the works at Le Creusot owned by the brothers Adolphe and Eugène Schneider. However, the Schneiders hesitated to build Bourdon's radical new machine. Bourdon and Eugène Schneider visited the Nasmyth works in England in the middle of 1840, where they were shown Nasmyth's sketch. This confirmed the feasibility of the concept to Schneider. In 1840 Bourdon built the first steam hammer in the world at the Schneider & Cie works at Le Creusot. It weighed 2,500 kilograms (5,500 lb) and lifted to 2 metres (6 ft 7 in). The Schneiders patented the design in 1841.

Nasmyth visited Le Creusot in April 1842. By his account, Bourdon took him to the forge department so he might, as he said, "see his own child". Nasmyth said "there it was, in truth–a thumping child of my brain!" After returning from France in 1842 Nasmyth built his first steam hammer in his Patricroft foundry in Manchester, England, adjacent to the (then new) Liverpool and Manchester Railway and the Bridgewater Canal. In 1843 a dispute broke out between Nasmyth and Bourdon over priority of invention of the steam hammer. Nasmyth, an excellent publicist, managed to convince many people that he was the first.

=== Early improvements ===
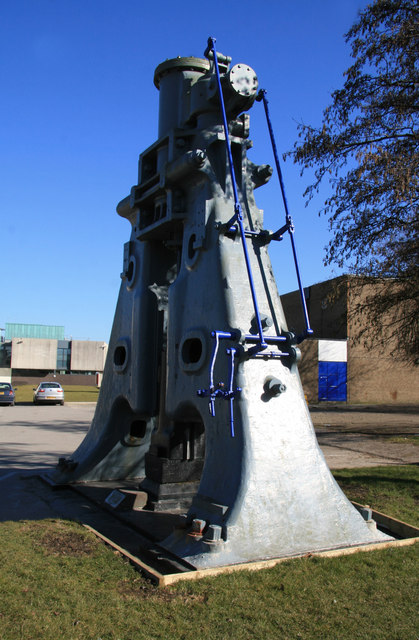
Nasmyth & Wilson steam hammer at the University of Bolton

Nasmyth's first steam hammer, described in his patent of 9 December 1842, was built for the Low Moor Works at Bradford. They rejected the machine, but on 18 August 1843 accepted an improved version with a self-acting gear. Robert Wilson (1803–1882), who had also invented the screw propeller and was manager of Nasmyth's Bridgewater works, invented the self-acting motion that made it possible to adjust the force of the blow delivered by the hammer – a critically important improvement. An early writer said of Wilson's gear, "... I would be prouder to say that I was the inventor of that motion, then to say I had commanded a regiment at Waterloo..." Nasmyth's steam hammers could now vary the force of the blow across a wide range. Nasmyth was fond of breaking an egg placed in a wineglass without breaking the glass, followed by a blow that shook the building.

By 1868 engineers had introduced further improvements to the original design. John Condie's steam hammer, built for Fulton in Glasgow, had a stationary piston and a moving cylinder to which the hammer was attached. The piston was hollow, and was used to deliver steam to the cylinder and then remove it. The hammer weighed 6.5 tons with a stroke of 7.5 feet (2.3 m). Condie steam hammers were used to forge the shafts of Isambard Kingdom Brunel's SS Great Eastern. A high-speed compressed-air hammer was described in The Mechanics' Magazine in 1865, a variant of the steam hammer for use where steam power was not available or a very dry environment was required.

The Bowling Ironworks steam hammers had the steam cylinder bolted to the back of the hammer, thus reducing the height of the machine. These were designed by John Charles Pearce, who took out a patent for his steam hammer design several years before Nasmyth's patent expired. Marie-Joseph Farcot of Paris proposed a number of improvements including an arrangement so the steam acted from above, increasing the striking force, improved valve arrangements and the use of springs and material to absorb the shock and prevent breakage. John Ramsbottom invented a duplex hammer, with two rams moving horizontally towards a forging placed between them.

Using the same principles of operation, Nasmyth developed a steam-powered pile-driving machine. At its first use at Devonport, a dramatic contest was carried out. His engine drove a pile in four and half minutes compared with the twelve hours that the conventional method required. It was soon found that a hammer with a relatively short fall height was more effective than a taller machine. The shorter machine could deliver many more blows in a given time, driving the pile faster even though each blow was smaller. It also caused less damage to the pile.

Riveting machines designed by Garforth and Cook were based on the steam hammer. The catalog for the Great Exhibition held in London in 1851 said of Garforth's design, "With this machine, one man and three boys can rivet with perfect ease, and in the firmest manner, at the rate of six rivets per minute, or three hundred and sixty per hour." Other variants included crushers to help extract iron ore from quartz and a hammer to drive holes in the rock of a quarry to hold gunpowder charges. An 1883 book on modern steam practice said

The direct application of steam to forging hammers is beyond question the greatest improvement that has ever been made in forging machinery; not only has it simplified the operations that were carried on before its invention, but it has added many branches, and extended the art of forging, to purposes that could never have been attained except by the steam hammer. ... The steam hammer ... seems to be so perfectly adapted to fill the different conditions of power hammering that there seems nothing left to be desired...

=== Later development ===
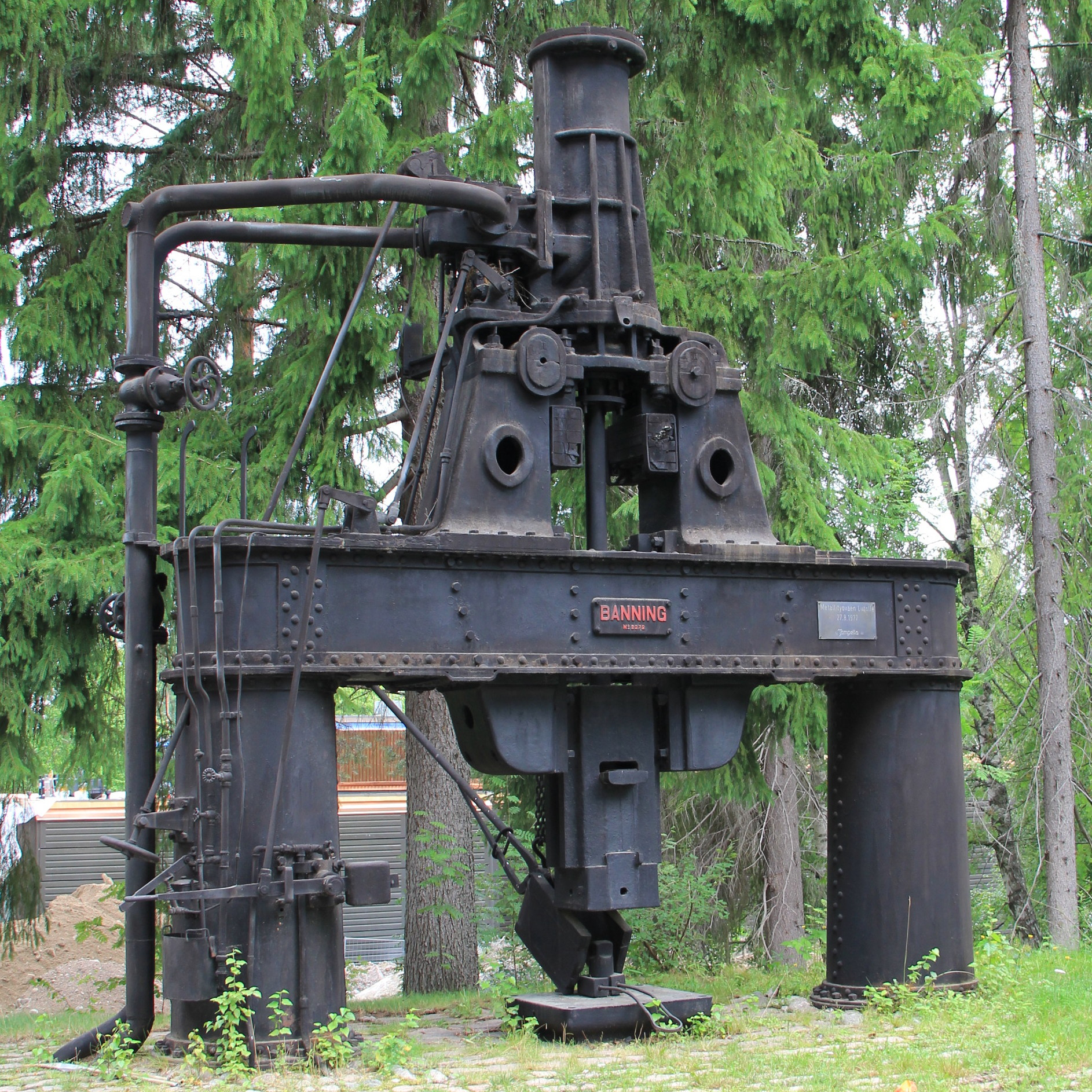
Steam hammer manufactured by F. Banning AG in 1929, used by Tampella, located since 1977 at the Murikka Institute in Tampere, Finland as memorial of iron industry in the city.

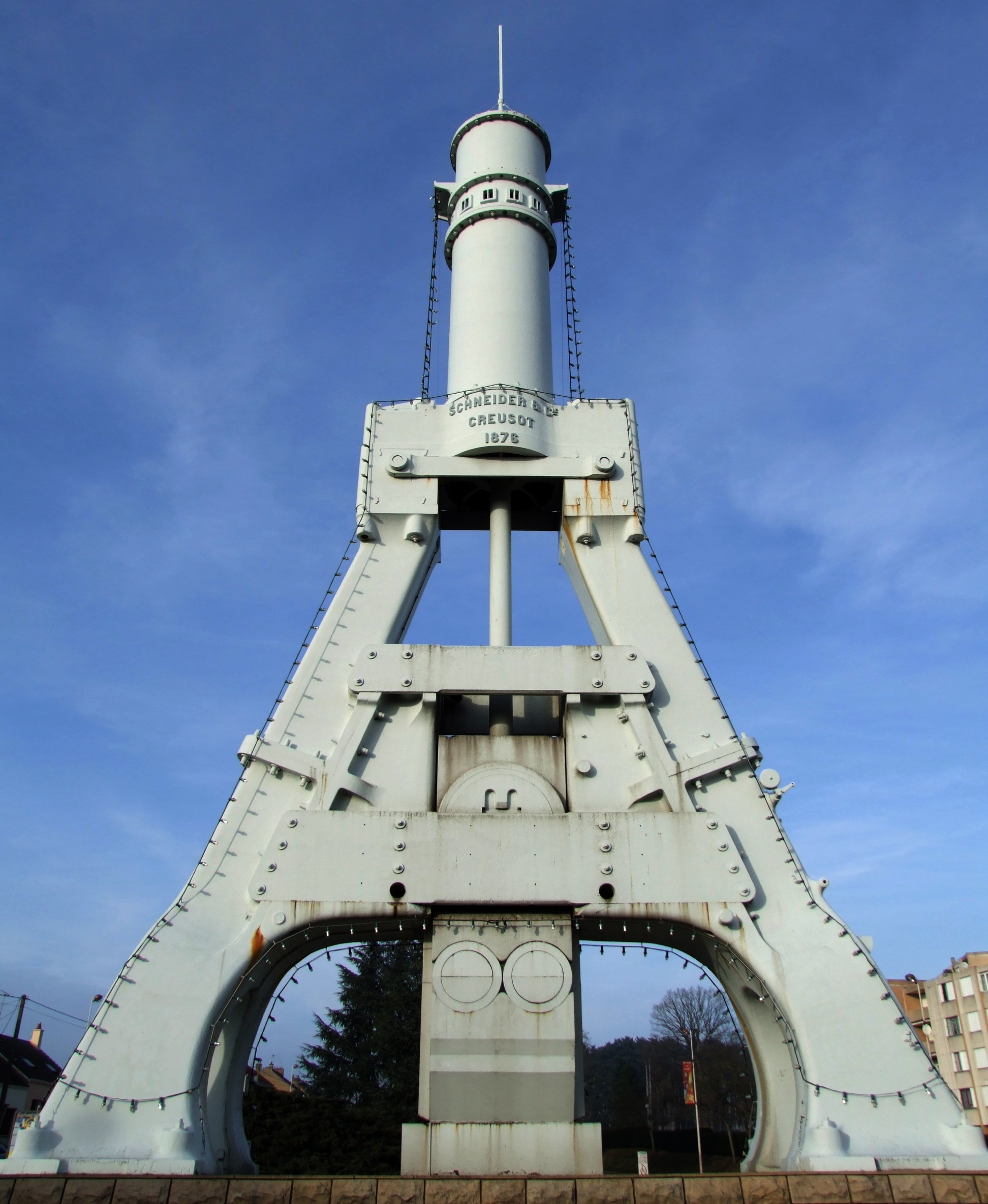
The giant Creusot steam hammer built in 1877 by Schneider et Cie in Le Creusot

Schneider & Co. built 110 steam hammers between 1843 and 1867 with different sizes and strike rates, but trending towards ever larger machines to handle the demands of large cannon, engine shafts and armor plate, with steel increasingly used in place of wrought iron. In 1861 the "Fritz" steam hammer came into operation at the Krupp works in Essen, Germany. With a 50-ton blow, for many years it was the most powerful in the world.

There is a story that the Fritz steam hammer took its name from a machinist named Fritz whom Alfred Krupp presented to the Kaiser Wilhelm when he visited the works in 1877. Krupp told the emperor that Fritz had such perfect control of the machine that he could let the hammer drop without harming an object placed on the center of the block. The Emperor immediately put his watch, which was studded with diamonds, on the block and motioned Fritz to start the hammer. When the machinist hesitated, Krupp told him "Fritz let fly!" He did as he was told, the watch was unharmed, and the emperor gave Fritz the watch as a gift. Krupp had the words "Fritz let fly!" engraved on the hammer.

The Schneiders eventually saw a need for a hammer of colossal proportions. The Creusot steam hammer was a giant steam hammer built in 1877 by Schneider and Co. in the French industrial town of Le Creusot. With the ability to deliver a blow of up to 100 tons, the Creusot hammer was the largest and most powerful in the world. A wooden replica was built for the Exposition Universelle (1878) in Paris. In 1891 the Bethlehem Iron Company of the United States purchased patent rights from Schneider and built a steam hammer of almost identical design but capable of delivering a 125-ton blow.

Eventually the great steam hammers became obsolete, displaced by hydraulic and mechanical presses. The presses applied force slowly and at a uniform rate, ensuring that the internal structure of the forging was uniform, without hidden internal flaws. They were also cheaper to operate, not requiring steam to be blown off, and much cheaper to build, not requiring huge strong foundations.

The 1877 Creusot steam hammer now stands as a monument in the Creusot town square. An original Nasmyth hammer stands facing his foundry buildings (now a "business park"). A larger Nasmyth & Wilson steam hammer stands in the campus of the University of Bolton.

Steam hammers continue to be used for driving piles into the ground. Steam supplied by a circulating steam generator is more efficient than air. However, today compressed air is often used rather than steam. As of 2013 manufacturers continued to sell air/steam pile-driving hammers. Forging services suppliers also continue to use steam hammers of varying sizes based on classical designs.

== See also ==
- Trip hammer
- Power hammer
- Pile driver
- Frohnauer Hammer Mill
