= Robert Wilson (engineer) =

- Born: 10 September 1803; Dunbar, Scotland
- Died: 28 July 1882 (aged 78); Matlock, Derbyshire, England
- Occupation: Engineer
- Known for: Screw propeller

Robert Wilson FRSE FRSSA (10 September 1803 – 28 July 1882) was a Scottish engineer, remembered as inventor of a special kind of a screw propeller, which he demonstrated in 1827 (although the first patent was awarded to another inventor in 1836). Wilson also designed a self-acting motion for steam hammers which was key to making them practical for industrial use, among many other inventions.

== Early years ==
Robert Wilson was born in Dunbar on the eastern Scottish coast on 10 September 1803, son of a fisherman. His father was drowned in 1810, and the family moved inland. Wilson left school at the age of nine. He became a joiner's apprentice. From an early age he began experimenting with model boats driven by "rotating sculls", with different numbers of blades on a shaft, and blades of different shapes and sizes set at different angles. The minutes of the Dunbar Mechanic's Institute of 18 October 1827 record,

Mr Robert Watson presented to the meeting two models invented by Mr Robert Wilson (member of this institution)–the first, a Horizontal Wind Wheel; the second, a Model with an Apparatus for propelling Steam vessels from the stern, a kind of Revolving Scull. By it the vessel goes with greater speed than with side paddles, and produces so little motion of the water as to fit admirably for canal navigation. About three months ago, this model, with the apparatus attached, was tried on the water in the presence of the Honourable Capt. Antony Maitland and Sir William Houston, was well as several leading members of this institution.

James Maitland, 8th Earl of Lauderdale became interested in Wilson's experiments, and in 1827 notified the Admiralty of the invention, but did not gain their attention. Wilson conducted successful sea trials in April 1828 on the Firth of Forth near to Leith, observed by witnesses who included Vice-Admiral David Milne. However, Wilson was forced to stop when he ran into debt. He resumed the trials in June 1832 using a loaned 18 feet (5.5 m) boat, and won the silver medal of the Highland Society of Scotland. Once again the Admiralty ignored his results. On 17 September 1833 the captain superintendent of the Woolwich dockyard wrote "We have carefully examined the papers ... the plan proposed ... is objectionable, as it involves a greater loss of power than the common mode of applying the [paddle]wheels to the side." (Note: Francis Pettit Smith of Kent became interested in screw propulsion in 1835 and was granted a patent in 1836. He is often said to be the inventor of the technique. Later Wilson was to claim that Smith had modified his patented design so it was exactly the same as that tested by Wilson in 1827. John Ericsson, an American engineer and inventor born in Sweden, is also credited with the invention.)

== Foundry manager ==
In 1838 Wilson was appointed Works Manager at James Nasmyth's Bridgewater Foundry in Patricroft near Manchester. He improved Nasmyth's design for a steam hammer, inventing the self-acting motion that made it possible to adjust the force of the blow delivered by the hammer – a critically important improvement. An early writer said of Wilson's gear, "... I would be prouder to say that I was the inventor of that motion, then to say I had commanded a regiment at Waterloo..." Nasmyth's steam hammers could now vary the force of the blow across a wide range. Nasmyth was fond of breaking an egg placed in a wineglass without breaking the glass, followed by a blow that shook the building.

From 1845 to 1856 Wilson was employed by the Low Moor Ironworks near Bradford in Yorkshire. While at Low Moor he improved the steam hammer with the "circular balanced valve". He returned to the Bridgewater foundry in July 1856, and became Managing Partner when Nasmyth retired at the end of that year. The company designed and manufactured machine tools, hydraulic presses, pumps and locomotives. Wilson built a very large double-acting steam hammer (Note: A single-acting steam hammer is raised by the pressure of steam injected into the lower part of a cylinder and drops under gravity when the pressure is released. With a double-acting steam hammer, steam is also used to push the ram down, giving a more powerful blow.) for the Royal Arsenal at Woolwich. The company was renamed Nasmyth, Wilson & Co. in 1867, and Wilson continued to be a partner until 1882.

Between 1842 and 1880 Wilson took out more than thirty patents for mechanical devices. In 1857 he became a member of the Institution of Mechanical Engineers. In 1873 he was made a Fellow of the Royal Society of Edinburgh. He was also a member of the Royal Scottish Society of Arts. He was finally awarded £500 by the War Office for his double action screw propeller for torpedoes in 1880. Wilson died on 28 July 1882 in Matlock, Derbyshire, England at the age of 78.

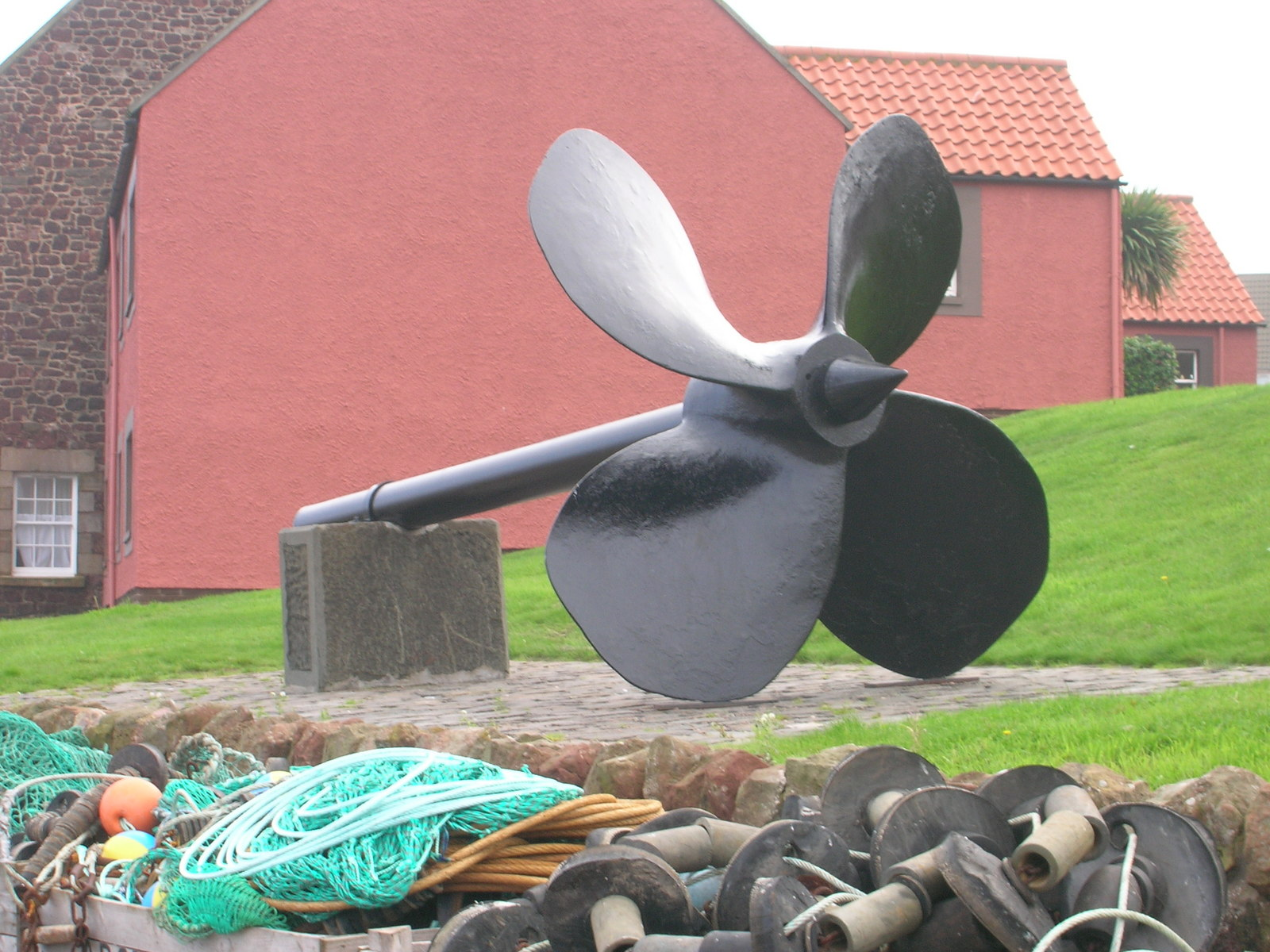
monument to Wilson and his invention of the Propeller, Dunbar harbour

== Bibliography ==
- Wilson, Robert (1860). The screw propeller: who invented it?.
- Wilson, Robert (1875). A treatise on steam boilers.
- Wilson, Robert (1877). Common Sense for Gas-users. Being a Catechism of Gas-lighting. For Householders, Etc.
