= Anti-Invasion Floating Mortar =

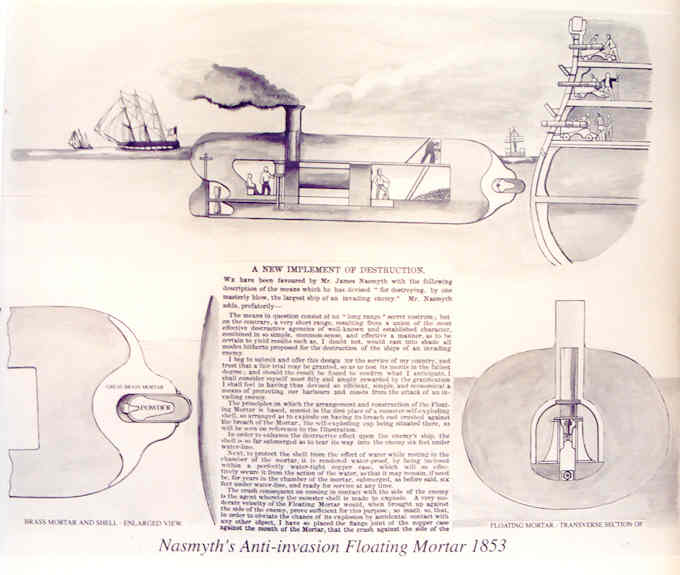
- Naysmith Mortar (1853)

History
- Name: Anti-Invasion Floating Mortar
- In service: Never built

General characteristics (as designed)
- Length: 80 ft (24 m)
- Beam: 30 ft (9.1 m)
- Propulsion: Steam engine, single screw
- Speed: More than 10 knots (19 km/h; 12 mph)
- Armament: Explosive-filled ram
- Armour: 10 ft (3.0 m)

Also known as Naysmyth's Submarine Mortar and the Steam Ram, the Anti-Invasion Floating Hammer was a semi-submerged naval ship design conceived and published by inventor James Nasmyth in 1853.

== About ==
The mortar had a length of 80 feet (24 m) and a beam of 30 feet (9.1 m) and was equipped with a small steam engine that drove a single propeller. The walls of the mortar were 10 feet (3.0 m) thick, protecting it against potential enemy gunfire of that period. At the front of the boat was a hollow brass cap shaped like a ram that was 9 feet thick. Inside the ram was a case filled with a heavy charge of explosive powder. With only the funnel and a domed structure covering the pilot being visible above water, the mortar sought to attack enemy ships by ramming the hull with the explosive-filled ram at speeds of over 10 knots (19 km/h; 12 mph). Because of potential dangers associated with its means of attack, the Anti-Invasion Floating Mortar was never built.

== See also ==
- Spar torpedo
- USS Monitor
- Monitor (warship)
