= Bidestroff =

- Commune
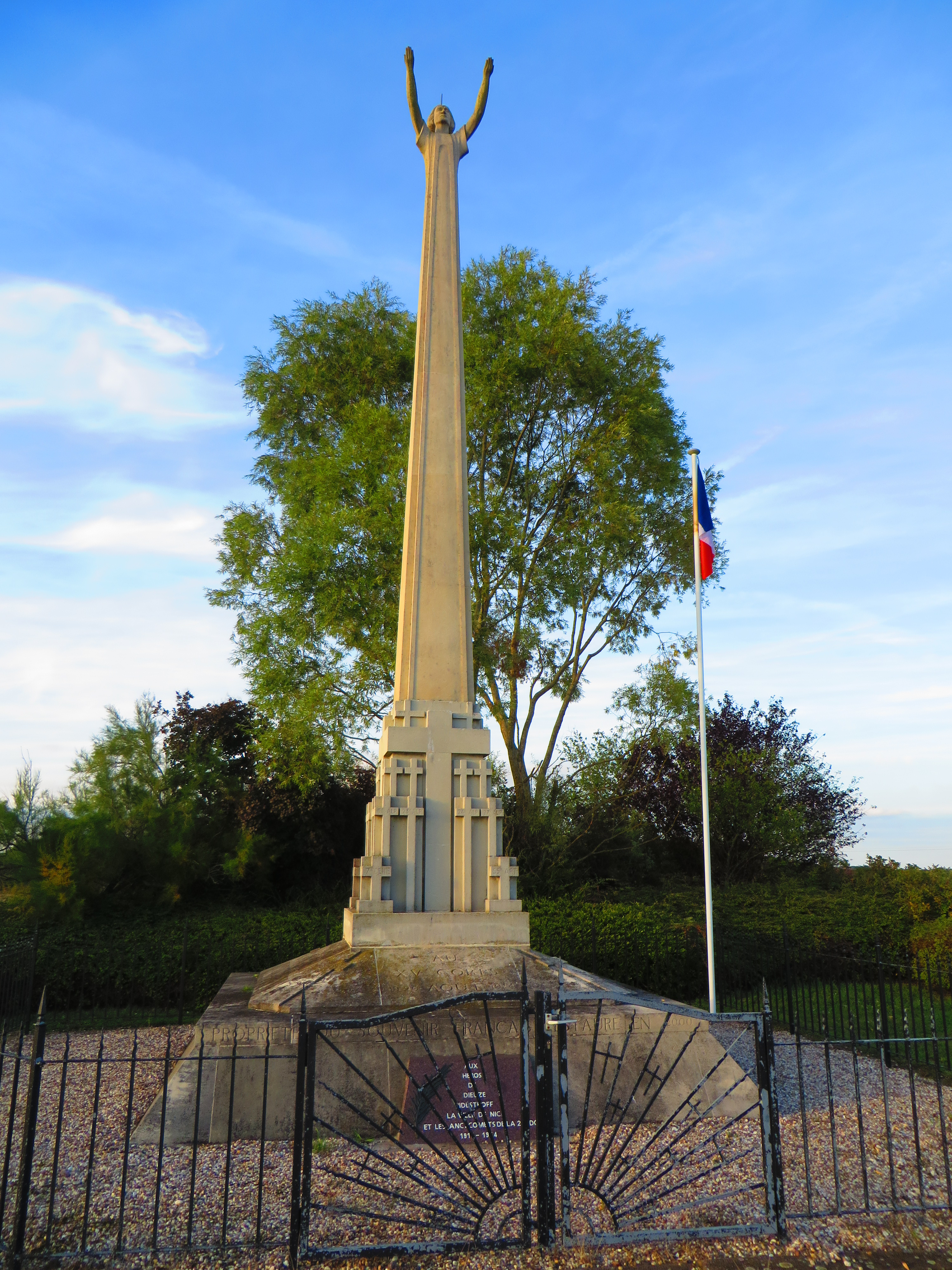
- The war memorial in Bidestroff

- Coat of arms
- Location of Bidestroff
- Location within France Location within Grand Est
- Coordinates: 48°50′58″N 6°47′15″E
- Country: France
- Region: Grand Est
- Department: Moselle
- Arrondissement: Sarrebourg-Château-Salins
- Canton: Le Saulnois
- Intercommunality: CC Saulnois

Government
  - Mayor (2020–2026): Hervé Bello
- Area^{1}: 7.95 km^{2} (3.07 sq mi)
- Elevation: 240 m (790 ft)
- Highest elevation: 275 m (902 ft)
- Lowest elevation: 210 m (690 ft)
- Population (2023): 115
  - Density: 14.5/km^{2} (37.5/sq mi)
- Time zone: UTC+01:00 (CET)
  - Summer (DST): UTC+02:00 (CEST)
- INSEE/Postal code: 57081 /57260
- ^{1} French Land Register data, which excludes lakes, ponds, glaciers > 1 km^{2} (0.386 sq mi or 247 acres) and river estuaries.

Bidestroff (French pronunciation: [bidɛstʁɔf]; German: Biedesdorf) is a commune in the Moselle department in Grand Est in northeastern France.

== Population ==
Historical population
| Year | Pop. | ±% p.a. |
|---|---|---|
| 1968 | 146 | — |
| 1975 | 110 | −3.96% |
| 1982 | 104 | −0.80% |
| 1990 | 128 | +2.63% |
| 1999 | 145 | +1.40% |
| 2007 | 132 | −1.17% |
| 2012 | 124 | −1.24% |
| 2017 | 129 | +0.79% |
| 2023 | 115 | −1.90% |
Source: INSEE

== See also ==
- Communes of the Moselle department
