= Adolphe Schneider =

French businessman

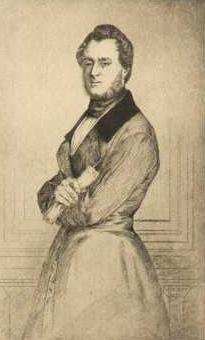
- Born: François Antoine Adolphe Schneider; 23 October 1802; Nancy, Meurthe, France
- Died: 3 August 1845 (aged 42); Creusot, Saône-et-Loire, France
- Occupation: Industrialist

Adolphe Schneider (23 October 1802 – 3 August 1845) was a French financier and industrialist who developed a major metalworking enterprise at Le Creusot, the parent of today's Schneider Electric.

== Early years ==
Adolphe Schneider was born in Nancy, France, on 23 October 1802. He was the son of Antoine Schneider (1759–1828), Châtelain de Bidestroff, and Catherine Duran. His cousin was Antoine Virgile Schneider, who was known for his military service in Greece. Virgile married a Polish heiress who brought a considerable dowry. He was elected a deputy for Sarreguemines in 1834, became minister of war and was involved with construction of the fortifications of Paris.

In 1821, at the age of nineteen, Adolphe Schneider entered the Seillière bank. Schneider had been recommended to François Seillière by his cousin Virgile. Seillière was from a Catholic family from Lorraine that had moved to Paris. The bank specialized in helping companies involved in iron-making and metallurgy such as Ignace-François de Wendel. (Note: The De Wendel family had established a forge and foundry at Hayange in Lorraine.) Schneider quickly showed he had a strong business sense with exceptional qualities of listening, understanding, analysis and improvisation. In 1829 Seillière began to give him a share in the profits from supplies of wool, wheat and wood from the north and from marine insurance.

In 1830 Schneider was the bank's agent with the French expeditionary force to Algiers, for which the bank was providing supplies. Schneider met the army's needs from Spanish suppliers, who were cheaper than the French. The project was a great success for the bank. Schneider received a 2% commission on all the merchandise, which gave him enough capital to go into business on his own account as a cloth merchant. On 7 July 1831 he married Valérie Aignan (1812–1861) in Paris. They had three children: Camille, Marie, and Paul Henry.

Around this time Schneider formed a relationship with the owners of the Le Creusot ironworks, and loaned them money. The works at Le Creusot had been founded fifty years before by a company partly owned by King Louis XVI. Despite an investment of 30 million francs, the works had never prospered. Le Creusot went bankrupt and was sold at auction in 1835 for 1,850,000 francs.

== Industrialist ==
Adolph's younger brother Eugène Schneider had begun work as a clerk in Reims, then joined his brother at the Seillière bank. In 1827 the baron de Neuflize employed him as manager of a forge near Sedan, a position he held for nearly ten years. In 1835 Schneider obtained financing and acquired the works at Le Creusot from the purchaser at a premium of one million francs. Adolphe brought in Eugène to run the works while he handled finance and sales.

In 1838 the works built the first French railway locomotive, and since then Le Creusot supplied almost all locomotives in France. At that time the works employed about 2,000 men. In 1842 the inventor François Bourdon designed and built a steam hammer for the works, one of the first. Schneider entered politics in 1840, when he was elected to the municipal council of Creusot. On 29 March 1841 he became mayor. He became a member of the Chamber of Deputies in 1842.

Adolphe Schneider died on 3 August 1845 from a fall from his horse. His brother replaced him in the Chamber of Deputies. He is buried in the cemetery of Père-Lachaise in Paris.

== Legacy ==
The industrial empire of Schneider et Cie. based on metallurgy and armament manufacturing prospered with the development of railways, iron ships and modern weapons such as machine guns, tanks and artillery. At one time the Schneider-Creusot iron works were the world's largest. Adolphe's grandson Jacques Schneider inherited the family business, and was a balloonist and aircraft enthusiast who created the Schneider Trophy. After World War I the arms business went bankrupt, and Jacques Schneider died in poverty. The parent company survived and prospered and today is Schneider Electric.

== Sources ==
- Fontaine, Jacqueline (2010-09-01). La Scolarisation et la Formation professionnelle des filles au pays de Schneider: (1844-1942) (in French). Editions L'Harmattan. p. 20. ISBN 978-2-296-26310-9.
- Hartmann, Gérard (25 May 2008). "La 1ère Coupe internationale de vitesse Jacques Schneider" (PDF).
- "Jacques SCHNEIDER". Geneanet.
- Landes, David S. (1999-05-17). The Wealth and Poverty of Nations: Why Some Are So Rich and Some So Poor. W. W. Norton. p. 272. ISBN 978-0-393-06981-5.
- Pound, Ezra (1959). Annotated Index to The Cantos of Ezra Pound: Cantos I-LXXXIV. University of California Press. GGKEY:P0R08T98409.
- "The Schneider Cup: Death of Donor". Barrier Miner. 4 May 1928.
- Thurston, Robert Henry (1876). "Conservatoire des Arts et Métiers". Reports of the Commissioners of the United States to the International Exhibition Held at Vienna, 1873. U.S. Government Printing Office. p. 394.
