= Eugène Schneider =

French industrialist and politician

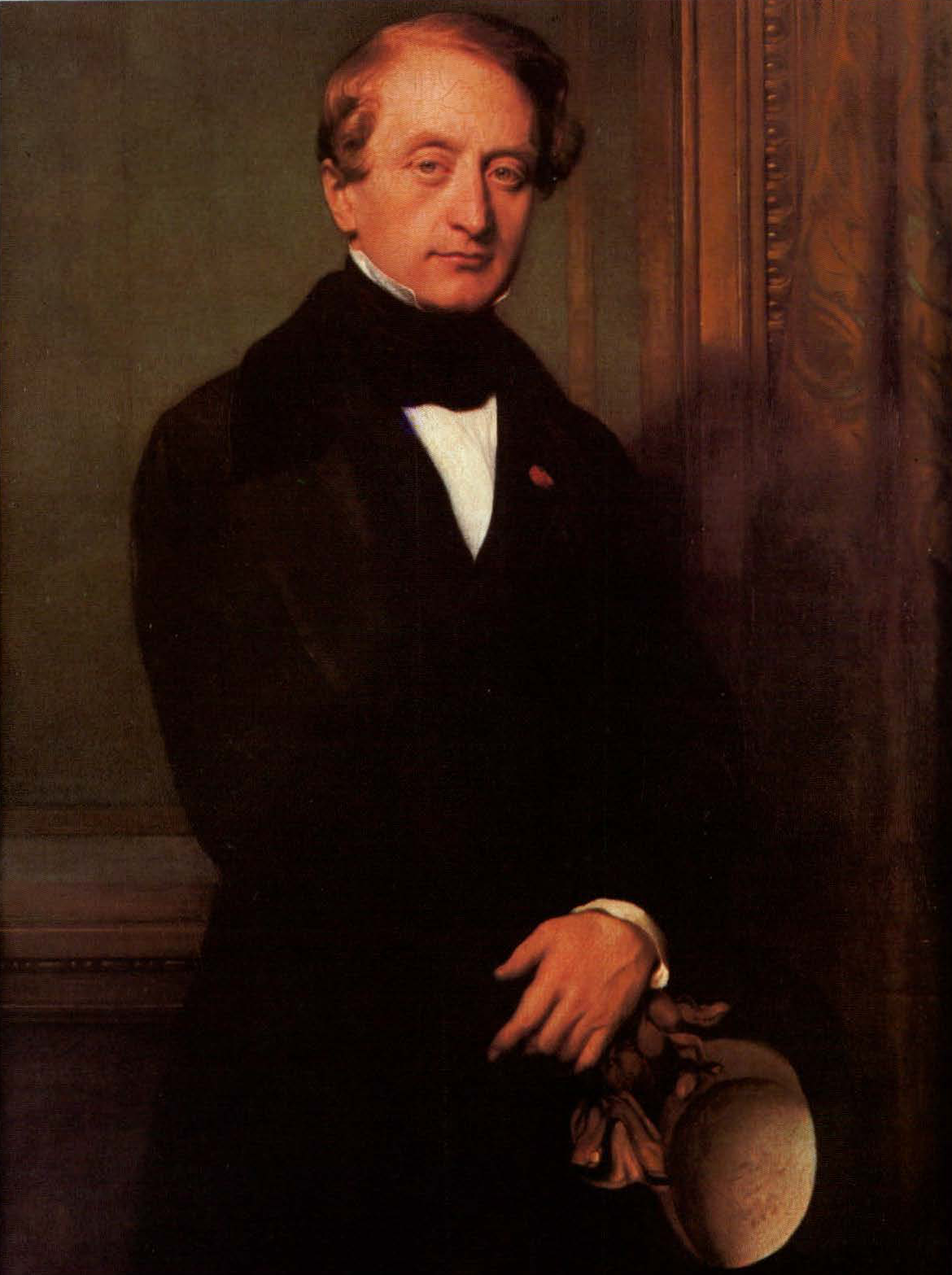

Président du Corps législatif
- In office 2 April 1867 – 4 September 1870
- Preceded by: Alexandre Colonna-Walewski
- Succeeded by: Jules Grévy

Minister of Commerce and Agriculture
- In office 24 January 1851 – 10 April 1851
- Preceded by: Louis Bernard Bonjean
- Succeeded by: Louis Buffet

President of the Conseil général de Saône-et-Loire
- In office 1852–1869

Deputy of Saône-et-Loire
- In office 13 September 1845 – 4 September 1870
- Preceded by: Adolphe Schneider

Personal details
- Born: Joseph Eugène Schneider; 29 March 1805 Bidestroff, Moselle, France
- Died: 27 November 1875 (aged 70) Paris, France
- Children: Henri Schneider
- Relatives: Adolphe Schneider (brother); Eugène Schneider II (grandson)

Joseph Eugène Schneider (29 March 1805 – 27 November 1875) was a French industrialist and politician. In 1836, he co-founded the Schneider company with his brother, Adolphe Schneider. For many years he was a Deputy, and he was briefly Minister of Commerce and Agriculture in 1851.

== Early life ==
Eugène Schneider was born on 29 March 1805 in Bidestroff, in the department of Moselle, France. He was the brother of Adolphe Schneider (1802–45), who served as a Deputy from 1842 to 1845. His father died when he was young, and he took a modest job in a trading house in Reims, then in the bank of Baron François-Alexandre Seillière.

== Business career ==
Schneider showed great aptitude for business, and at the age of 25 was appointed a director of the forges at Bazeilles.

In 1833, his brother was appointed managing director of Le Creuzot, and he was added as co-manager the same year. He made a powerful contribution to the prosperity of this establishment.

After his brother died Schneider became the sole director of Le Creuzot and soon was a powerful industrialist.

In the crisis year of 1848 Charles de Wendel and Eugène Schneider saved the foundry at Fourchambault from bankruptcy by co-signing a huge bank loan.

Schneider obtained a monopoly in supplying arms to the French government, supplied the materials for government-encouraged railway construction.

What would become the Comité des forges was founded in 1864. The committee had the goals of managing relations between the industry and government, promoting exports and coordinating prices.

Eugène Schneider was the first president. There were ten members, each representing a region.

== Political career ==
After his brother's death Eugène Schneider was elected General Counselor of Couches and Montcenis. He was elected Deputy of the 5th college of Saône-et-Loire (Autun) on 13 September 1845.

During the July Monarchy, Schneider was a deputy until 24 February 1848, sitting with the government majority.

During the French Second Republic Schneider ran unsuccessfully in 1848 for election to the Constituent Assembly, and again ran unsuccessfully in 1849 for election to the Legislative Assembly.

On 20 January 1851, Louis-Napoleon Bonaparte, President of the Republic, invited Schneider to join an interim cabinet as Minister of Agriculture and Commerce, which he kept until 10 April 1851. Schneider was then appointed Commander of the Legion of Honour.

Schneider supported the coup d'état of 2 December 1851 that launched the Second French Empire. He became a member of the consultative commission, and on 29 February 1852 was elected to the Corps législatif for the 2nd constituency of Saône-et-Loire, running as the official candidate.

He was reelected in turn of 22 June 1857, 1 June 1863 and 24 May 1869. Schneider was President of the Corps from 2 April 1867 to 4 September 1870.

When Jérôme David was reappointed Vice-President in June 1869, this was seen as a promise to the reactionary party, and Schneider submitted his resignation. He agreed to remain only at the personal request of the emperor.

He was a member of the Corps législatif until 4 September 1870, always sitting with the dynastic majority.

== Death ==
Schneider died on 27 November 1875 in Paris. He was buried in the San Charles church in Le Creusot (Saône-et-Loire). His son Henri Schneider took over control of the Le Creusot foundry.

== Legacy ==
He is one of the 72 names inscribed on the Eiffel Tower.

== See also ==
- List of works by Henri Chapu (the first statue of Eugène Schneider in Le Creusot)

== Sources ==
- "Comité des forges", Encyclopédie Larousse (in French), Éditions Larousse
- Cooper, Thompson (1872), Men of the Time: A Dictionary of Contemporaries, G. Routledge and sons
- Eugène, Joseph Schneider (in French), Assemblée nationale
- Gille, Bertrand (1968), La Sidérurgie française au XIXe siècle: Recherches histioriques (in French), Librairie Droz, ISBN 978-2-600-04046-4
- Landes, David S. (1999-05-17), The Wealth and Poverty of Nations: Why Some Are So Rich and Some So Poor, W. W. Norton, ISBN 978-0-393-06981-5
- Priouret, Roger (1992-02-04), Origines du patronat français, Grasset, ISBN 978-2-246-79486-8
- Quigley, Carroll (1966), Tragedy And Hope, New York: Macmillan, ISBN 0-945001-10-X
- Robert, Adolphe; Cougny, Gaston (1889), "Schneider (Eugène, Joseph)", Dictionnaire des parlementaires français de 1789 à 1889 (in French)
