= Elvire de Brissac =

French novelist and biographer

- Born: 19 January 1939 (age 87)
- Occupations: Novelist, biographer
- Parent(s): Pierre de Cossé Brissac, 12th Duke of Brissac; Marie-Zélie Schneider
- Relatives: Eugène Schneider (maternal great-great-grandfather); Henri Schneider (maternal great-grandfather); Eugène Schneider II (maternal grandfather); Charles Schneider (maternal uncle); Lilian Constantini (maternal aunt)

Elvire de Brissac (born 19 January 1939) is a French novelist and biographer. Her awards include the Prix des Deux Magots, Grand prix des lectrices de Elle, Prix Contrepoint, Prix Goncourt, and the Prix Femina essai.

== Biography ==
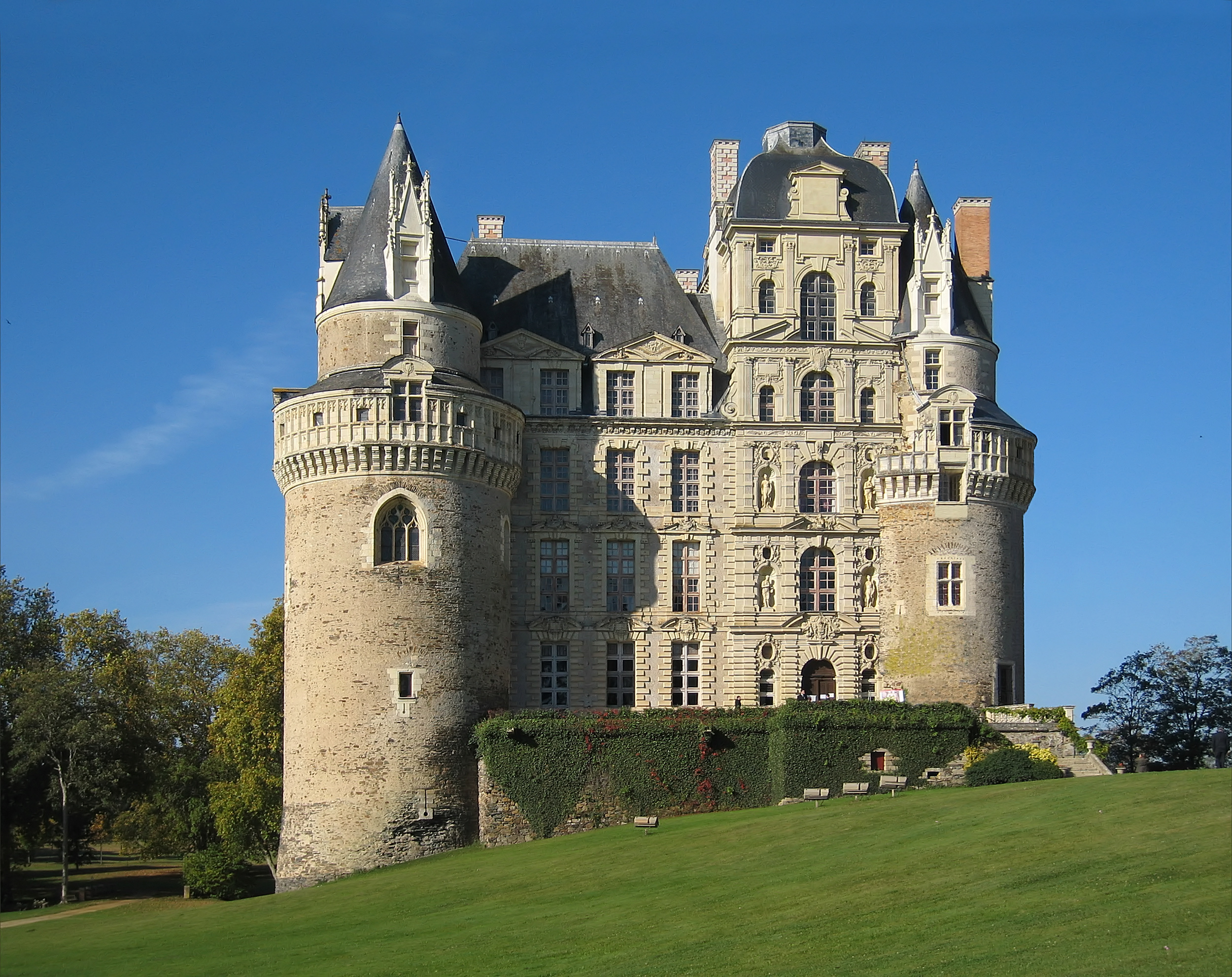
Château de Brissac

Elvire de Brissac was born on 19 January 1939. Her father Pierre de Cossé Brissac was the 12th Duke of Brissac, a businessman and author. Her mother Marie-Zélie Schneider, also known as May Schneider, was the daughter of French industrialist Eugène Schneider II and an heiress to the Schneider-Creusot fortune.

She grew up at the Château de Brissac in Brissac-Quincé, Maine-et-Loire, France.

She is a novelist and biographer.

She received the Prix des Deux Magots for A Pleur-Joie in 1969, the Grand prix des lectrices de Elle and the Prix Contrepoint for Un long mois de septembre in 1972, the Prix Goncourt for Les anges d'en bas in 1999, and the Prix Femina Essai for Ô dix-neuvième! in 2001.

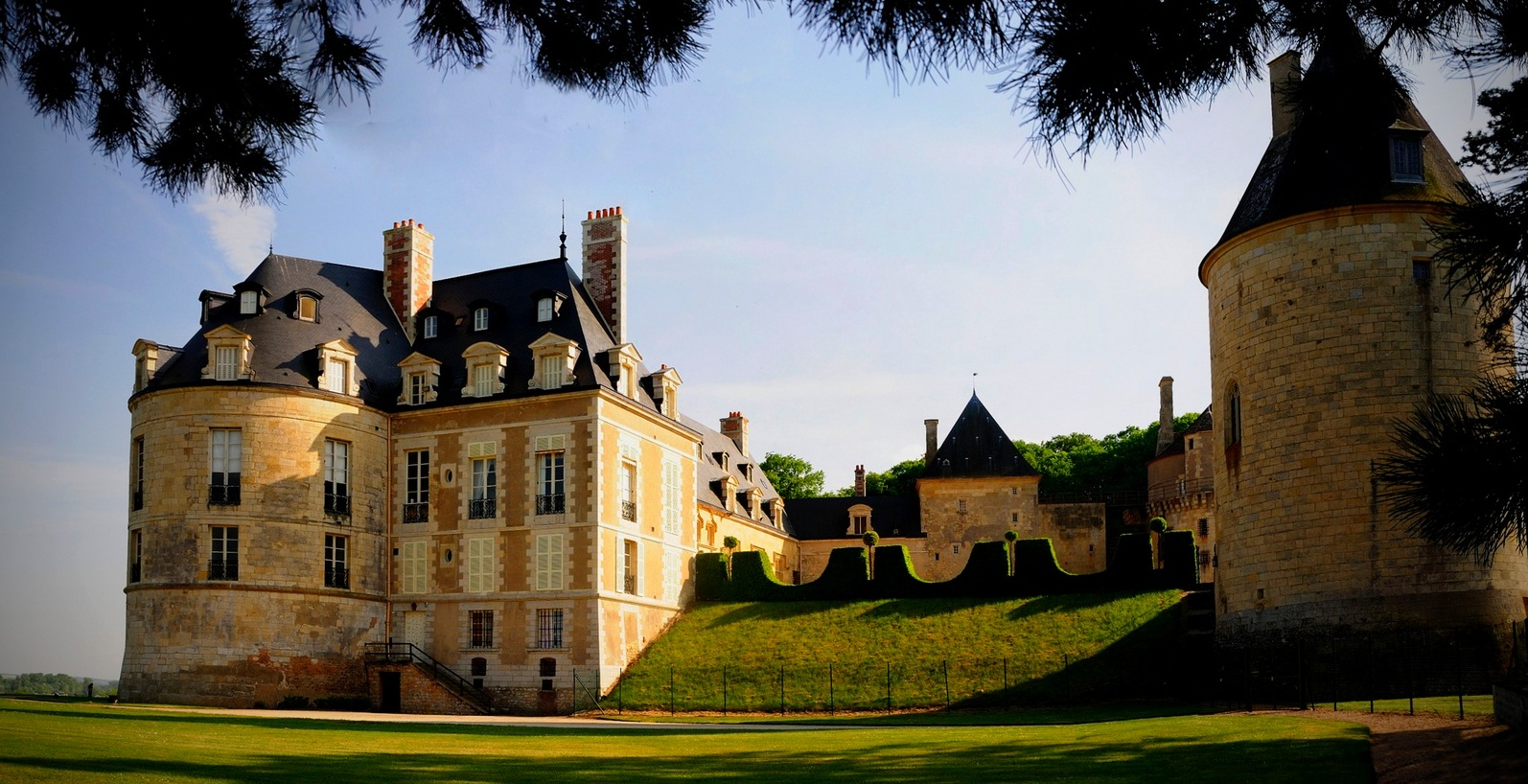
Château d'Apremont-sur-Allier

She resides at the Château d'Apremont-sur-Allier in Apremont-sur-Allier, Cher, France.

== Bibliography ==
=== Novels ===
- À pleur-joie, Grasset (1969).
- Un long mois de septembre (Paris: Grasset, 1971) Grand prix des lectrices de Elle
- Les Règles (Paris: Gallimard, 1974).
- Ballade américaine (Paris: Stock, 1976).
- Grabuge et l’Indomptable Amélie (Paris: Folio Junior, 1977).
- Ma chère République (Paris: Grasset, 1983).
- Le Repos (Paris: Grasset, 1986).
- Au Diable (Paris: Grasset, 1993).
- Le Tour de l'arbre (Paris: Grasset, 1996).
- Une forêt soumise (Paris: Grasset, 1997).
- Les Anges d’en bas (Paris: Grasset, 1998).
- Connaissez-vous les rides ? (Paris: Grasset, 2005).
- La Corde et le Vent (Paris: Grasset, 2014).

=== Biographies ===
- Ô dix-neuvième ! (Paris: Grasset, 2001).
- Il était une fois les Schneider, 1871-1942 (Paris: Grasset, 2007).
- Voyage imaginaire autour de Barbe Nicole Ponsardin Veuve Clicquot (1777 - 1866) (Paris: Grasset, 2009).
