= Hôtel de Ville, Le Creusot =

Town hall in Le Creusot, France

Hôtel de Ville
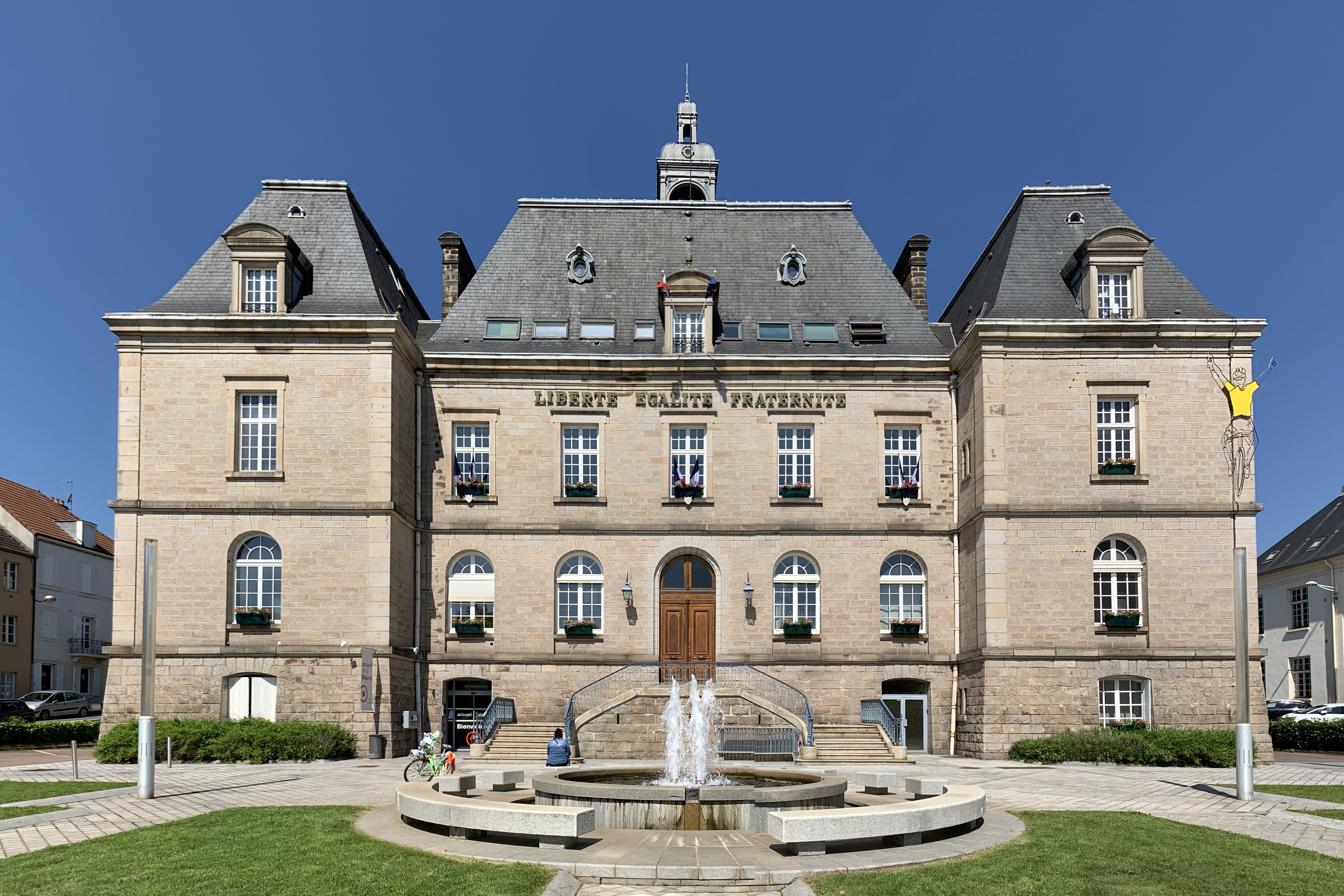
- The main frontage of the Hôtel de Ville in July 2021

General information
- Type: City hall
- Architectural style: Neoclassical style
- Location: Le Creusot, France
- Coordinates: 46.8053°N 4.4283°E
- Completed: 1901

Design and construction
- Architect: Louis Legrand

The Hôtel de Ville (French pronunciation: [otɛl də vil], City Hall) is a municipal building in Le Creusot, Saône-et-Loire, in eastern France, standing on Rue Clemenceau. It has been included on the Inventaire général des monuments by the French Ministry of Culture since 2000.

== History ==
Following the French Revolution, the new town council initially established itself in a building, which has since been demolished, on Rue Chaptal in 1790. The council subsequently relocated to a property, also since demolished, on Place de l'Église (now Place Schneider) and, after that, to a building, also since demolished, on Rue de Chalon (now Rue Clemenceau).

In the late 19th century, following a substantial increase in population, the council led by the mayor, Eugène Schneider II, decided to commission a more substantial town hall. This was made possible by a donation of FFr 250,000 from the engineering business, Schneider & Co. The site they selected was the Square du Guide which had been the venue for local politicians delivering speeches during industrial unrest in the late 19th century. The new building was designed by Louis Legrand in the neoclassical style, built in ashlar stone and was officially opened in 1901.

The design involved a symmetrical main frontage of seven bays facing onto Rue Clemenceau with the end bays projected forward as pavilions. The central bay featured a double forestair leading up to a round-headed doorway. The building was fenestrated by segmental-headed windows at basement level, round-headed windows on the ground floor and by casement windows with cornices on the first floor. There were three dormer windows with curved pediments at attic level, and the roof was surmounted by a square belfry, with a lantern and a finial. Internally, the principal room was the Salle du Conseil (council chamber).

On the night of 19 June 1943, during the Second World War, the Royal Air Force initiated a heavy bombing raid, targeting the Schneider factory and inflicting damage on the town hall and many other buildings in the town. After the war the new chairman of Schneider & Co, Charles Schneider, led the reconstruction of the factories, the town and its main public buildings. In 2005, the council initiated works to create an artificial terrace on stilts, known as the "Esplanade des Droits de l'Homme" (Human Rights Esplanade), in the area in front of the town hall. This allowed underground car parking to be provided below the esplanade.
