= Dominique Schneidre =

French novelist

- Born: Dominique Schneider; July 8, 1942 (age 84)
- Occupation: Novelist
- Parent(s): Charles Schneider; Lilian Constantini
- Relatives: Eugène Schneider (paternal great-great-grandfather); Adolphe Schneider (paternal great-great-granduncle); Henri Schneider (paternal great-grandfather); Eugène Schneider, II (paternal grandfather); Jean Schneider (paternal uncle); Jules Guesde (maternal great-grandfather)

Dominique Schneidre (born Dominique Schneider; July 8, 1942) is a French novelist.

== Early life ==
Dominique Schneidre was born on July 8, 1942. Her father, Charles Schneider, was a businessman. Her mother, Lilian Constantini, was an actress. Her sister, Catherine Schneider, is a former wife of director Roger Vadim.

Her paternal grandfather, Eugène Schneider, II, was a businessman, banker and politician. Her paternal great-grandfather, Henri Schneider, was a businessman. Her paternal great-great-grandfather, Eugène Schneider, was the co-founder, with her paternal great-great-granduncle Adolphe Schneider, of Schneider-Creusot in 1836. The company became known as Schneider Electric in 1999.

Her maternal great-grandfather, Jules Guesde, was a journalist and Socialist politician.

== Career ==
Schneider started her career as a psychoanalyst. She is a novelist. She has written seven novels. She has also co-written a children's book and a biography about her family.

Schneider was the recipient of the Prix Anna de Noailles from the Académie française in 2002 for Fortune de mère.

Her 2014 novel, Avons-nous assez navigué, is about an elderly woman who goes to the Palais Garnier to see Eugene Onegin. There, she meets an old lover, Antoine, and tries to rekindle their romance.

== Personal life ==
She lives in an apartment overlooking the Jardin du Luxembourg in the 6th arrondissement of Paris.

== Bibliography ==
=== Novels ===
- Atteinte à la mémoire des morts (Paris: Éditions Robert Laffont, 1987, 301 pages).
- Les Chagrins d'éternité (Paris: Éditions Robert Laffont, 1988, 187 pages).
- La Capitane (Paris: Éditions du Seuil, 1990, 282 pages).
- Gratin (Paris: Éditions JC Lattès, 1993, 175 pages).
- Le Corps principal (Paris: Éditions Albin Michel, 1997, 313 pages).
- Fortune de mère (Paris, Éditions Fayard, 2001, 359 pages).pages).
- Avons-nous assez navigué (Paris: Éditions JC Lattès, 2014, 200 pages).

=== Children's book ===
- Les Secrets d’Illan illustrés par Cézanne (with Lucien Chaminade; Paris: Réunion des Musées Nationaux/Éditions Calmann-Lévy, 1995, 26 pages).

=== Biography ===
- Les Schneider, Le Creusot : une famille, une entreprise, une ville : 1836-1960 (with Caroline Mathieu, Bernard Clément; Paris: Réunion des Musées Nationaux/Éditions Fayard, Le Creusot, Écomusée, 1995, 366 pages).
