= François de Cossé, 13th Duke of Brissac =

French aristocrat (1929–2021)

François de Cossé
- Arms of the Cossé family

President of the Jockey-Club de Paris
- In office 1997–2014

13th Duke of Brissac
- In office 4 April 1993 – 6 April 2021
- Preceded by: Pierre de Cossé
- Succeeded by: Charles-André de Cossé

Grand Master of the Order of Saint Lazarus
- In office 1986–2004

Personal details
- Born: Eugène Marie Timoléon François de Cossé; 19 February 1929 Le Creusot, France
- Died: 6 April 2021 (aged 92) Charcé-Saint-Ellier-sur-Aubance, France

François de Cossé, 13th Duke of Brissac (19 February 1929 – 6 April 2021), was a French nobleman and landowner. He held the French noble title of Duke of Brissac from 1993 until his death in 2021.

== Biography ==
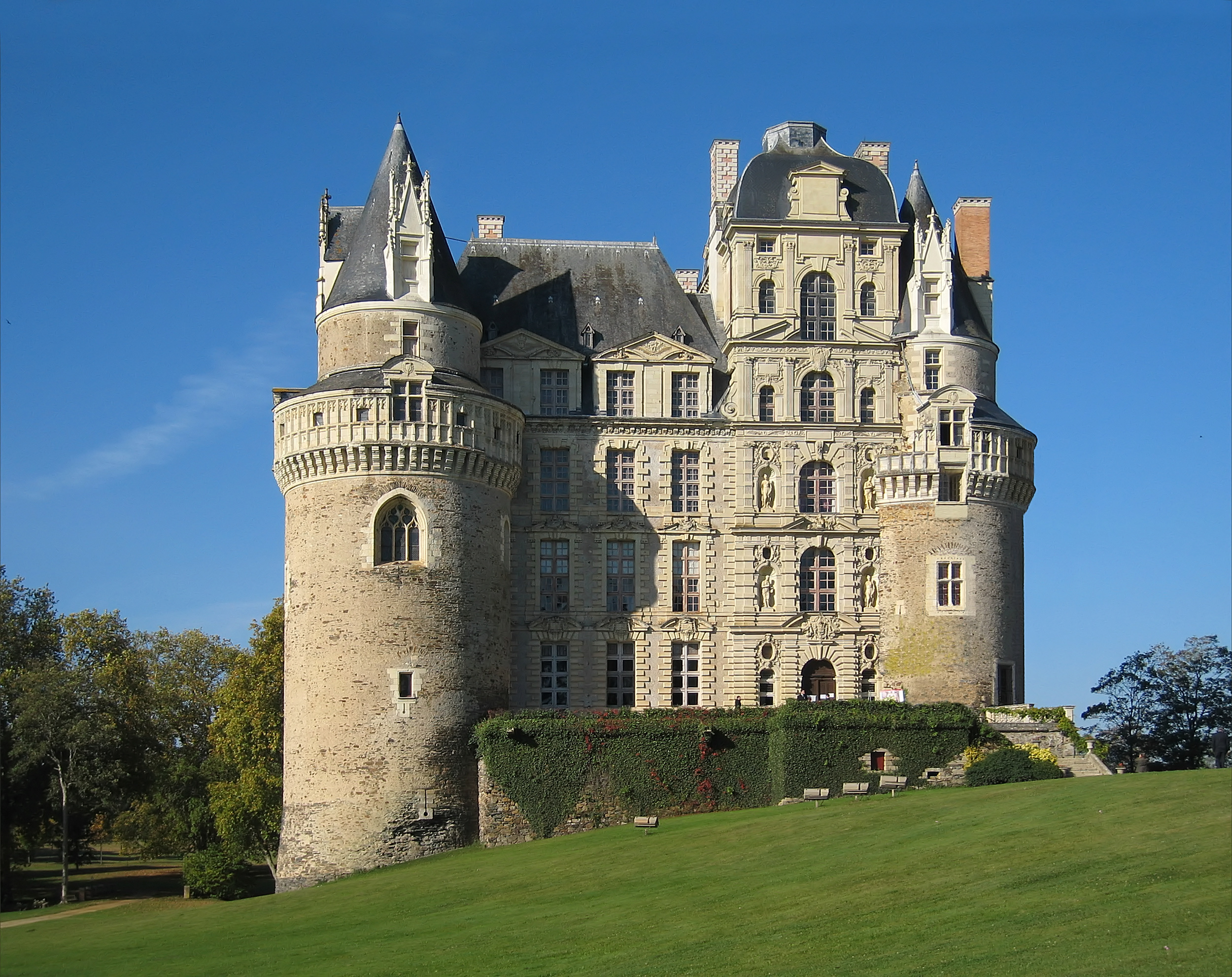
Château de Brissac

He was the elder son of Pierre de Cossé, 12th Duke of Brissac, and his wife Marie Zélie Antoinette Eugénie Schneider. She was the daughter of industrialist Eugène Schneider II.

In 1958, he married Jacqueline Alice Marie de Contades. Their children included the following: Agnès Alexandra Marie Bienvenue, Charles-André Raymond Timoléon Aymard Hubert Marie, Angélique Patricia Marie, Marie-Antoinette Elvire, and Pierre-Emmanuel Timoléon Marie Raymond.

He served as President of the Jockey-Club de Paris from 1997 to 2014, and he was Grand Master of the Order of Saint Lazarus from 1986 to 2004. He was the proprietor of the Château de Brissac in Brissac-Quincé.

The 13th Duke of Brissac died at his manor of La Roche in Charcé-Saint-Ellier-sur-Aubance on 6 April 2021, at the age of 92. He was succeeded in the ducal title by his elder son, Charles-André.

== Bibliography ==
- Les Brissac (1952)
- Les Brissac et l'histoire (1973)
- L'histoire de la maison Cossé-Brissac (1987)

French nobility
Preceded by Pierre de Cossé	Duke of Brissac; 1993–2021	Succeeded by Charles-André de Cossé
