= Château de la Verrerie =

Château de la Verrerie may refer to:

- Château de la Verrerie (Saône-et-Loire)
- Château de la Verrerie (Cher)
