= François de Cossé, 11th Duke of Brissac =

French aristocrat and author (1868–1944)

François de Cossé
- Duke of Brissac
- Full name: Anne Marie Timoléon François de Cossé
- Born: 12 February 1868; Paris, France
- Died: 1944 (aged 75–76)
- Spouse: Mathilde Renée de Crussol d'Uzès
- Issue: Pierre de Cossé
- Father: Roland de Cossé
- Mother: Jeanne Marie Say

Anne Marie Timoléon François de Cossé, 11th Duke of Brissac (1868–1944), was a French nobleman and author. He held the French noble title of Duke of Brissac from 1883 until his death in 1944.

== Early life and career ==
He was born on 12 February 1868 in Paris, France. His maternal grandfather, Louis Say, was the founder of the Say sugar empire (now known as Béghin-Say, a subsidiary of Tereos). His maternal granduncle, Jean-Baptiste Say, was a classical liberal economist.

He was educated at the École spéciale militaire de Saint-Cyr, a military academy in Brittany, France. He wrote a historical book about the Austrian court, titled Un Carrousel à la cour d'Autriche. In 1894, he wrote a second book, based on his memories about the army.

== Marriage and later life ==
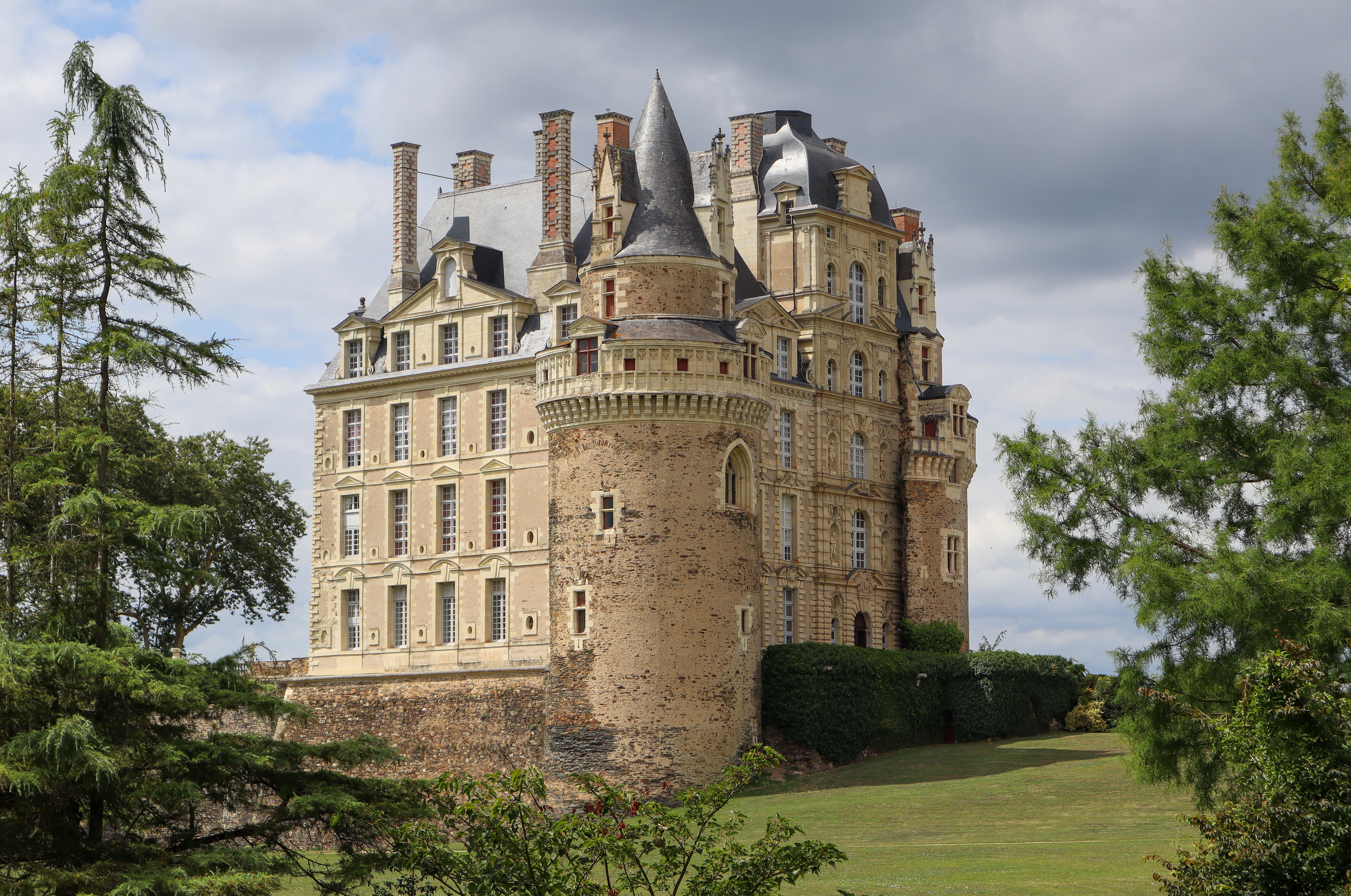
Château de Brissac

On 4 November 1894, he married Mathilde Renée de Crussol d'Uzès (1875–1908). She was the younger daughter of the 12th Duke of Uzès and his wife, Anne de Rochechouart de Mortemart. They resided at the Château de Brissac in Brissac-Quincé, France.

The 11th Duke of Brissac died in 1944. He was succeeded in the ducal title by his son, Pierre de Cossé.

== Bibliography ==
- Un Carrousel à la cour d'Autriche. (Nancy: imprimerie de Berger-Levrault).
- Leçons de chic. Souvenirs et traditions militaires, par une sabretache (1894, Paris: imprimerie de Berger-Levrault).

French nobility
Preceded by Marie Arthur Timoléon de Cossé	Duke of Brissac; 1883–1944	Succeeded by Pierre de Cossé
