= Canton of Le Creusot-2 =

Coordinates: 46.80°N 4.45°E

The canton of Le Creusot-2 is an administrative division of the Saône-et-Loire department, eastern France. It was created at the French canton reorganisation which came into effect in March 2015. Its seat is in Le Creusot.

It consists of the following communes:

1. Le Breuil
2. Le Creusot (partly)
3. Saint-Firmin
4. Saint-Pierre-de-Varennes
5. Saint-Sernin-du-Bois
