= Lucien Sergi =

French footballer (born 1971)

Personal information
- Full name: Lucien Sergi
- Date of birth: September 20, 1971 (age 55)
- Place of birth: Le Creusot, France
- Height: 1.73 m (5 ft 8 in)
- Position: Defender

Senior career*
Years	Team	Apps	(Gls)
1990–1997	Louhans-Cuiseaux	178	(3)
1997–1999	Valence	68	(0)
1999–2000	Chamois Niortais	16	(0)
2000–2001	Grenoble	13	(1)
2001–2006	Croix-de-Savoie	125	(2)
- * Club domestic league appearances and goals

Lucien Sergi (born September 20, 1971) is a former professional footballer who played as a right-back.

== See also ==
- Football in France
- List of football clubs in France
