= Le Breuil, Saône-et-Loire =

Le Breuil
- Commune
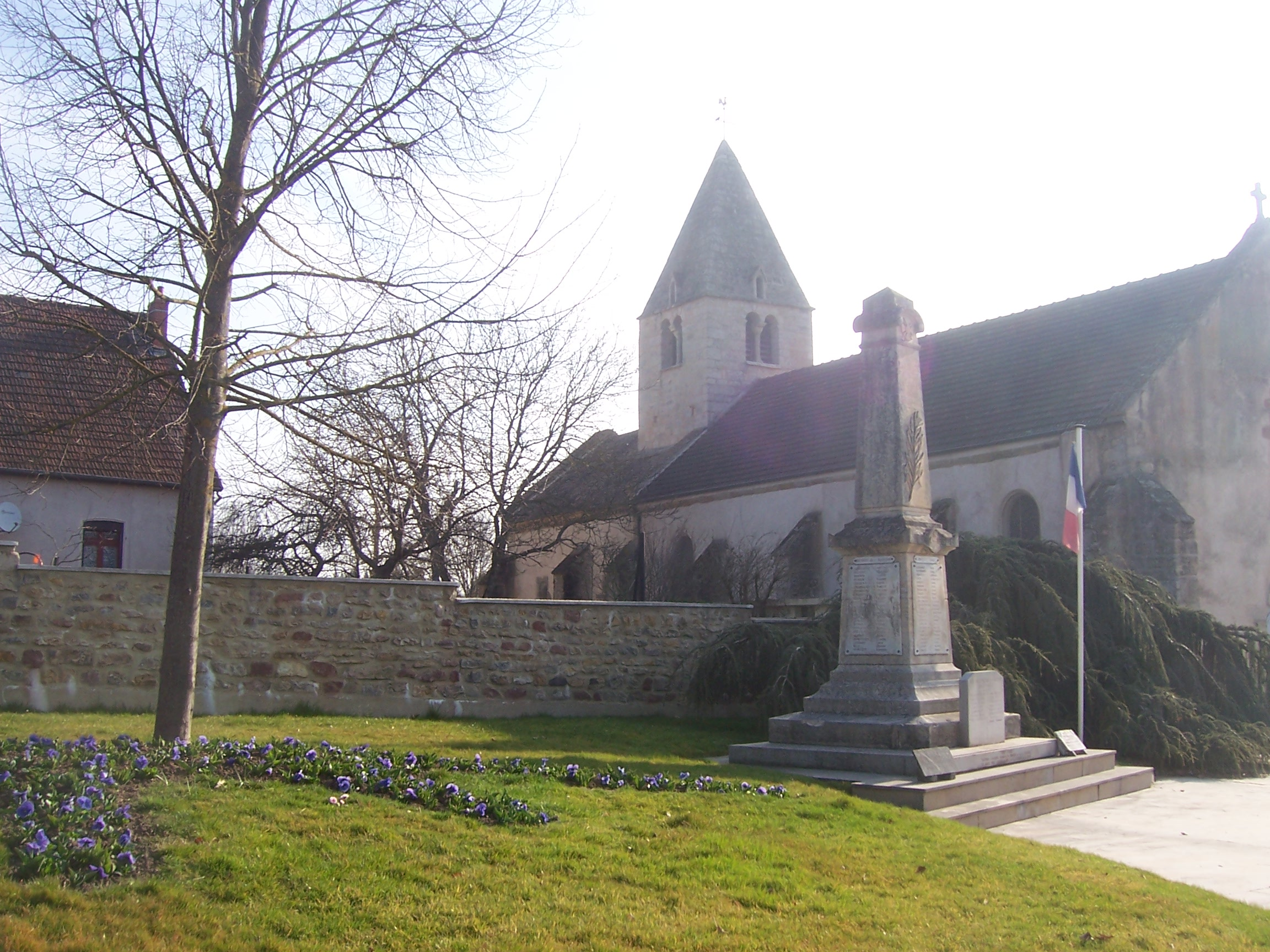
- The church in Le Breuil
- Location of Le Breuil
- Location within France Location within Bourgogne-Franche-Comté
- Coordinates: 46°47′43″N 4°29′01″E
- Country: France
- Region: Bourgogne-Franche-Comté
- Department: Saône-et-Loire
- Arrondissement: Autun
- Canton: Le Creusot-2
- Intercommunality: CU Creusot Montceau

Government
  - Mayor (2020–2026): Chantal Cordelier
- Area^{1}: 28.8 km^{2} (11.1 sq mi)
- Elevation: 338 m (1,109 ft)
- Highest elevation: 421 m (1,381 ft)
- Lowest elevation: 277 m (909 ft)
- Population (2023): 3,538
  - Density: 123/km^{2} (318/sq mi)
- Time zone: UTC+01:00 (CET)
  - Summer (DST): UTC+02:00 (CEST)
- INSEE/Postal code: 71059 /71670
- ^{1} French Land Register data, which excludes lakes, ponds, glaciers > 1 km^{2} (0.386 sq mi or 247 acres) and river estuaries.

Le Breuil (French pronunciation: [lə bʁœj]) is a commune in the Saône-et-Loire department in the region of Bourgogne-Franche-Comté in eastern France.

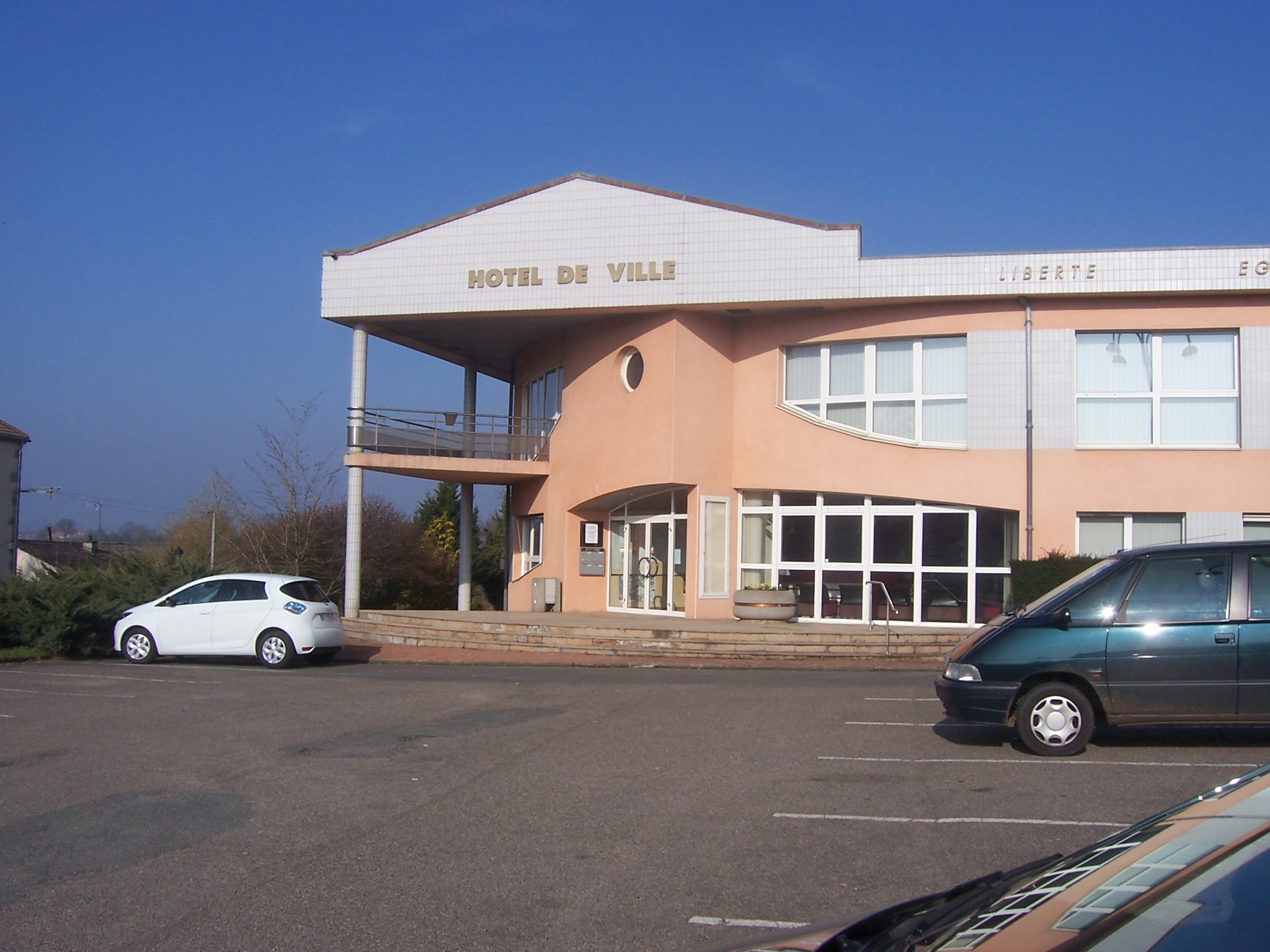
Town hall

== Population ==
Historical population
Year	Pop.	±% p.a.
1968	2,471	—
1975	3,067	+3.13%
1982	3,368	+1.35%
1990	3,741	+1.32%
1999	3,667	−0.22%
2007	3,537	−0.45%
2012	3,600	+0.35%
2017	3,573	−0.15%
2023	3,538	−0.16%
Source: INSEE

== See also ==
- Communes of the Saône-et-Loire department
