= Pierre de Cossé, 12th Duke of Brissac =

French aristocrat and author (1900–1993)

Pierre de Cossé
- Duke of Brissac
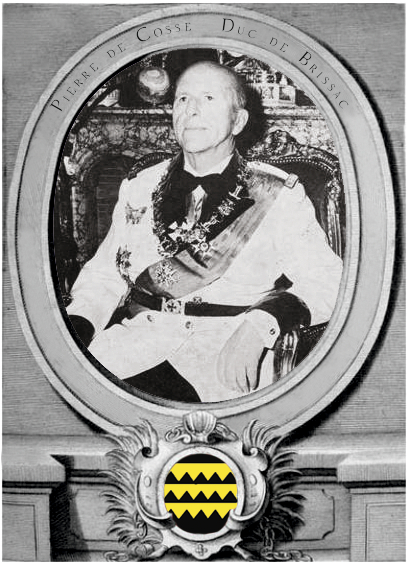
- Born: 13 March 1900; Paris, France
- Died: 4 April 1993 (aged 93); Paris, France
- Spouse: May Schneider (m. 1924)
- Issue: 4, including François and Elvire
- Father: François de Cossé, 11th Duke of Brissac
- Mother: Mathilde de Crussol d'Uzès
- Occupation: Memoirist

Pierre de Cossé, 12th Duke of Brissac (13 March 1900 – 4 April 1993), was a French nobleman and author who wrote historical memoirs. He held the French noble title of Duke of Brissac from 1944 until his death in 1993. His father-in-law was Eugène Schneider II, while Maurice Herzog was his son-in-law.

== Early life ==
He was born in 1900 in Paris, France. His father, François de Cossé, was the 11th Duke of Brissac from 1883 to 1944. His mother was Mathilde de Crussol d'Uzès, younger daughter of the 12th Duke of Uzès and his wife, Anne de Rochechouart de Mortemart.

== Career ==
He was the author of historical memoirs, and four of his memoirs were about his family, the Dukes of Brissac. In addition, he wrote the foreword to Guide du protocole et des usages, a book on good manners written by Jacques Gandouin in 1979.

== Personal life ==
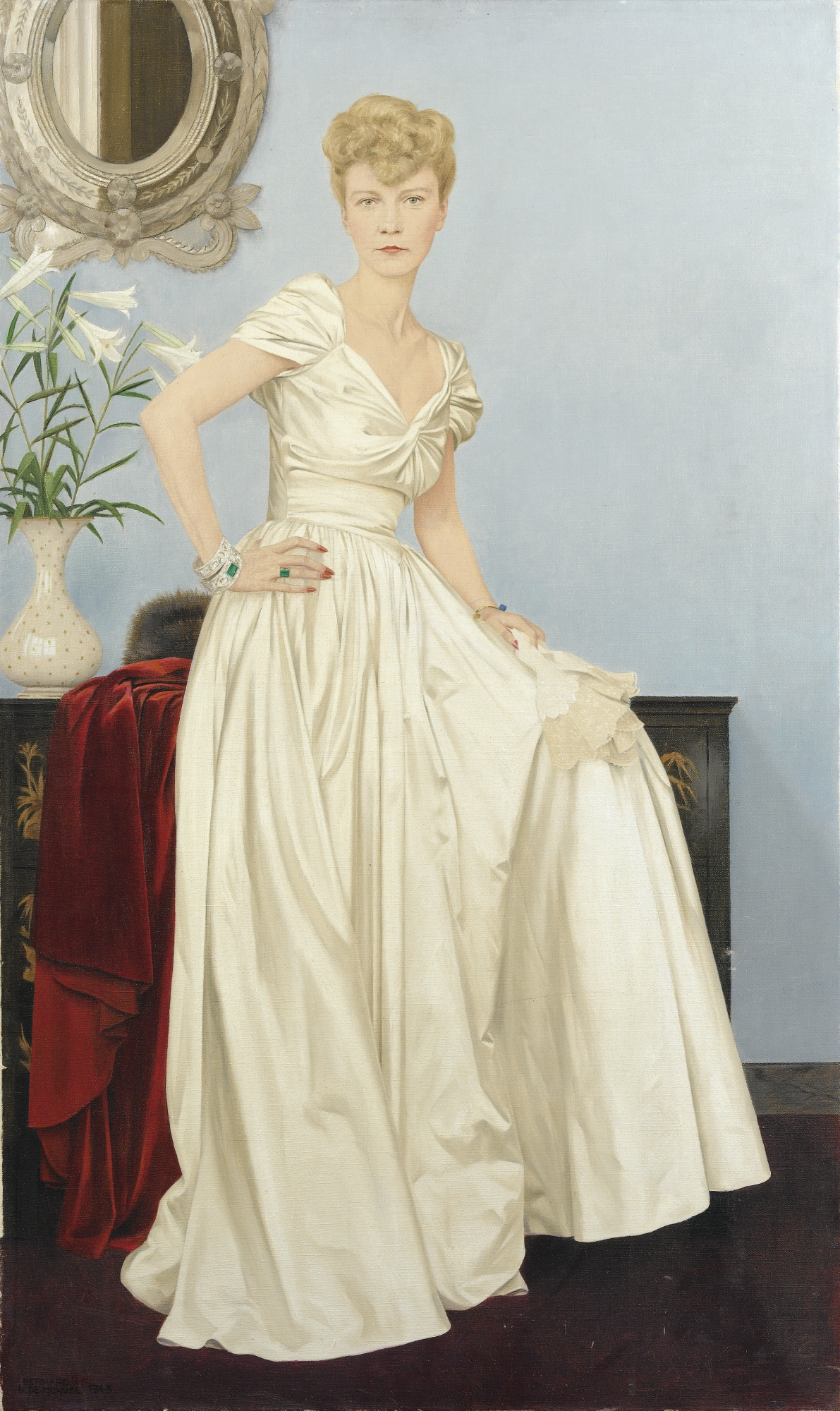
May Schneider, Duchess of Brissac

In 1924, he married Marie Zélie Antoinette Eugénie Schneider (1902–1999), known as May Schneider, the daughter of French industrialist Eugène Schneider II. They resided at the Château de La Celle in La Celle-les-Bordes, France.

They were the parents of two sons and two daughters:

1. Marie Pierre de Cossé (1925-2024), who married Simon Nora in 1947. They divorced in 1954 and she married, secondly, Maurice Herzog in 1964.
2. François de Cossé, 13th Duke of Brissac (1929–2021), who married Jacqueline Alice de Contades, daughter of Count André de Contades and Daisy Thome, in 1958.
3. Giles de Cossé (1935–2001).
4. Elvire de Brissac (b. 1939), a novelist.

The 12th Duke of Brissac died in 1993 in Paris, at the age of 93. He was succeeded in the ducal title by his elder son, François.

== Distinctions ==
- Grand Master of the Order of Saint Lazarus

== Published works ==
- La duchesse d'Uzès (Paris, Gründ, 1950, 201 pages).
- Les Brissac, Maison de Cossé (Paris: Éditions Fasquelle, 1973, 448 pages).
- A la Billebaude à travers l'Yveline (Chaumont, France: Éditions Crépin-Leblond, 1955, 214 pages).
- Chasse (Chaumont, France: Éditions Crépin-Leblond, 1957, 109 pages).
- Nord Kapp ou la Norvège vue par un Français (Paris: Éditions Del Duca, 1967).
- En d'autres temps (1900-1939) (Paris: Grasset, 1972, 455 pages).
- La suite des temps (1939-1958) (Paris: Grasset, 1974).
- Le temps qui court (1959-1974) (Paris: Grasset, 1977).
- Le château d'en face (1974-1985) (Paris: Grasset, 1986).

French nobility
| Preceded by François de Cossé | Duke of Brissac; 1944–1993 | Succeeded by François de Cossé |
