= Saint-Sernin-du-Bois =

- Commune
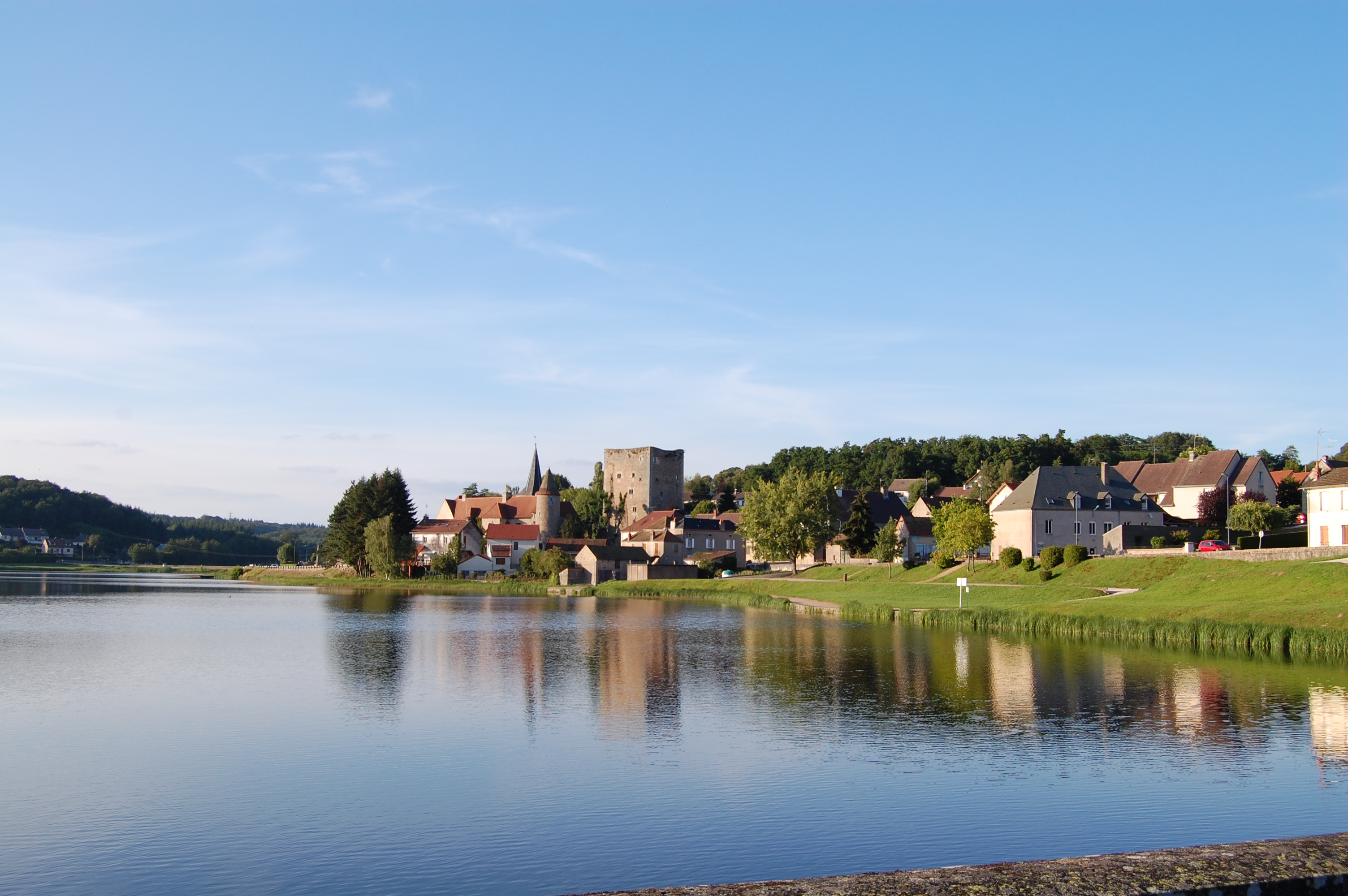
- A general view of Saint-Sernin-du-Bois

- Coat of arms
- Location of Saint-Sernin-du-Bois
- Location within France Location within Bourgogne-Franche-Comté
- Coordinates: 46°50′27″N 4°26′05″E
- Country: France
- Region: Bourgogne-Franche-Comté
- Department: Saône-et-Loire
- Arrondissement: Autun
- Canton: Le Creusot-2
- Intercommunality: CU Creusot Montceau
- Area^{1}: 14.67 km^{2} (5.66 sq mi)
- Elevation: 450 m (1,480 ft)
- Highest elevation: 537 m (1,762 ft)
- Lowest elevation: 318 m (1,043 ft)
- Population (2023): 1,734
  - Density: 118.2/km^{2} (306.1/sq mi)
- Time zone: UTC+01:00 (CET)
  - Summer (DST): UTC+02:00 (CEST)
- INSEE/Postal code: 71479 /71200
- ^{1} French Land Register data, which excludes lakes, ponds, glaciers > 1 km^{2} (0.386 sq mi or 247 acres) and river estuaries.

Saint-Sernin-du-Bois (French pronunciation: [sɛ̃ sɛʁnɛ̃ dy bwa]) is a commune in the Saône-et-Loire department in the region of Bourgogne-Franche-Comté in eastern France.

== See also ==
- Communes of the Saône-et-Loire department
