= Saint-Firmin, Saône-et-Loire =

Saint-Firmin
- Commune
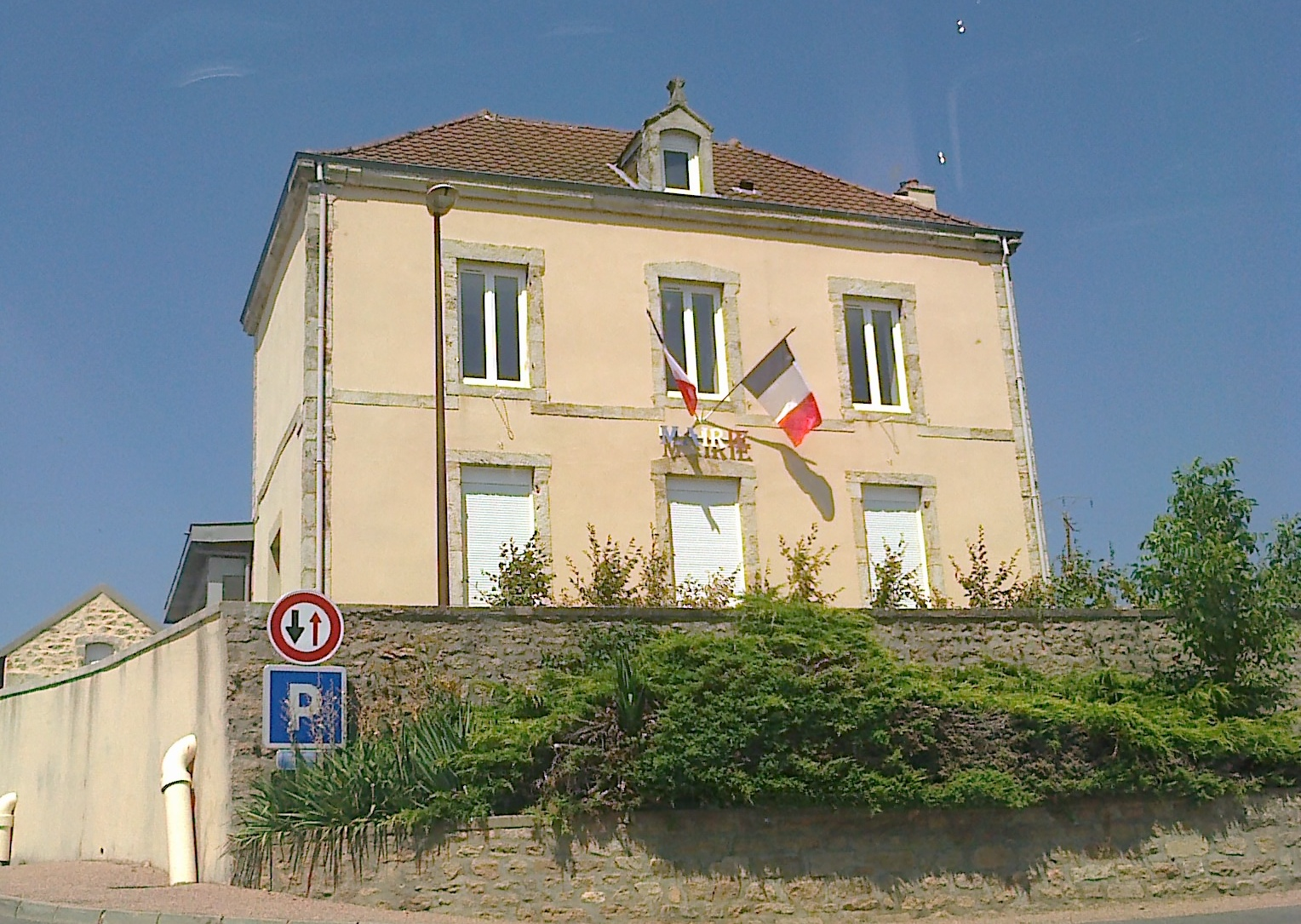
- Town hall

- Coat of arms
- Location of Saint-Firmin
- Location within France Location within Bourgogne-Franche-Comté
- Coordinates: 46°49′48″N 4°28′11″E
- Country: France
- Region: Bourgogne-Franche-Comté
- Department: Saône-et-Loire
- Arrondissement: Autun
- Canton: Le Creusot-2
- Intercommunality: CU Creusot Montceau

Government
  - Mayor (2026–32): Magali Douhéret
- Area^{1}: 15.77 km^{2} (6.09 sq mi)
- Elevation: 410 m (1,350 ft)
- Highest elevation: 512 m (1,680 ft)
- Lowest elevation: 336 m (1,102 ft)
- Population (2023): 773
  - Density: 49.0/km^{2} (127/sq mi)
- Time zone: UTC+01:00 (CET)
  - Summer (DST): UTC+02:00 (CEST)
- INSEE/Postal code: 71413 /71670
- ^{1} French Land Register data, which excludes lakes, ponds, glaciers > 1 km^{2} (0.386 sq mi or 247 acres) and river estuaries.

Saint-Firmin (French pronunciation: [sɛ̃ fiʁmɛ̃]) is a commune in the Saône-et-Loire department in the region of Bourgogne-Franche-Comté in eastern France.

== See also ==
- Communes of the Saône-et-Loire department
