= Saint-Pierre-de-Varennes =

- Commune
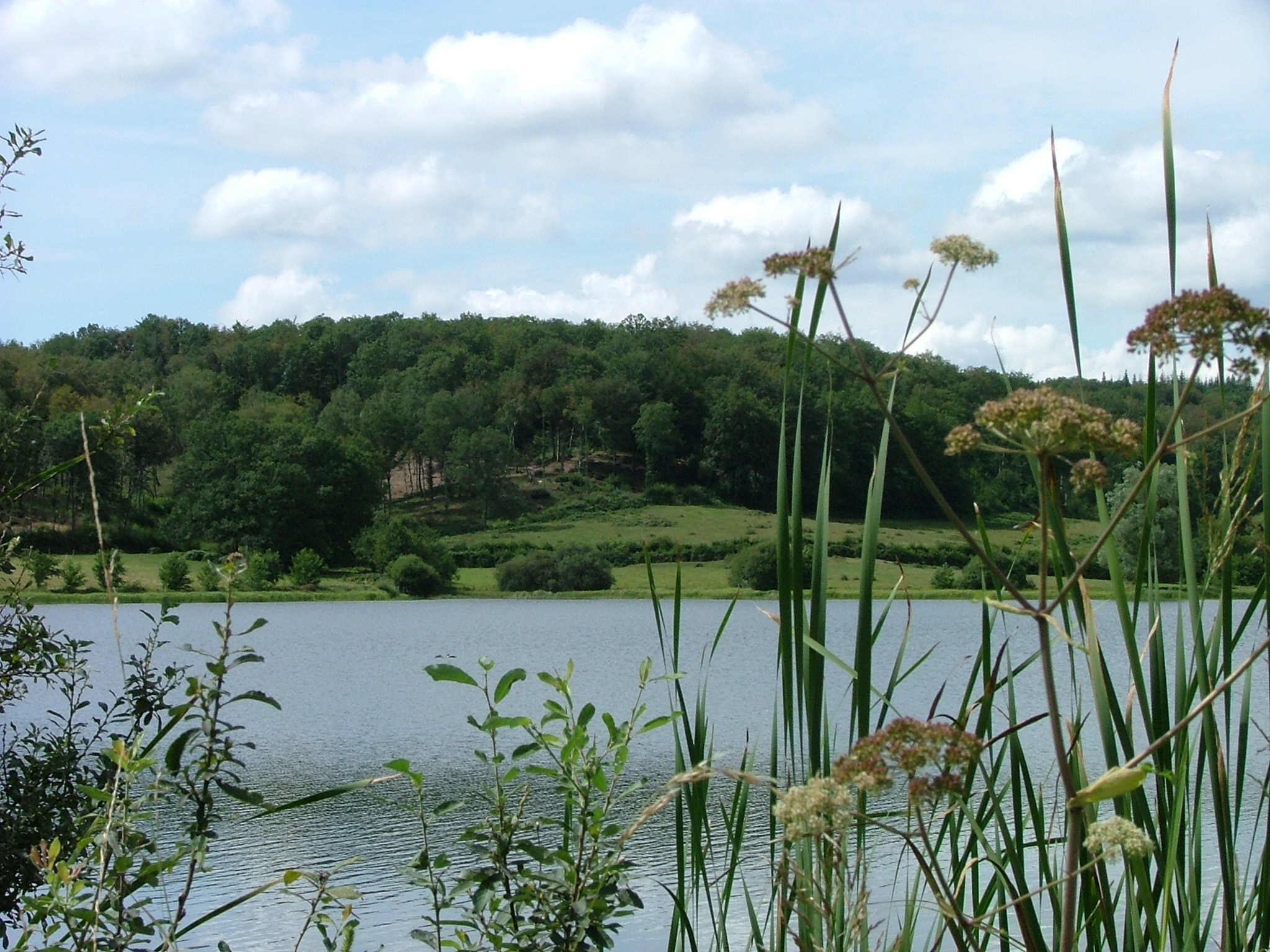
- Brandon Pond

- Coat of arms
- Location of Saint-Pierre-de-Varennes
- Location within France Location within Bourgogne-Franche-Comté
- Coordinates: 46°50′32″N 4°29′58″E
- Country: France
- Region: Bourgogne-Franche-Comté
- Department: Saône-et-Loire
- Arrondissement: Autun
- Canton: Le Creusot-2
- Intercommunality: CU Creusot Montceau
- Area^{1}: 23.08 km^{2} (8.91 sq mi)
- Elevation: 450 m (1,480 ft)
- Highest elevation: 490 m (1,610 ft)
- Lowest elevation: 285 m (935 ft)
- Population (2023): 836
  - Density: 36.2/km^{2} (93.8/sq mi)
- Time zone: UTC+01:00 (CET)
  - Summer (DST): UTC+02:00 (CEST)
- INSEE/Postal code: 71468 /71670
- ^{1} French Land Register data, which excludes lakes, ponds, glaciers > 1 km^{2} (0.386 sq mi or 247 acres) and river estuaries.

Saint-Pierre-de-Varennes (French pronunciation: [sɛ̃ pjɛʁ də vaʁɛn]) is a commune in the Saône-et-Loire department in the region of Bourgogne-Franche-Comté in eastern France.

== See also ==
- Communes of the Saône-et-Loire department
