= Château d'Apremont-sur-Allier =

Historic castle in France

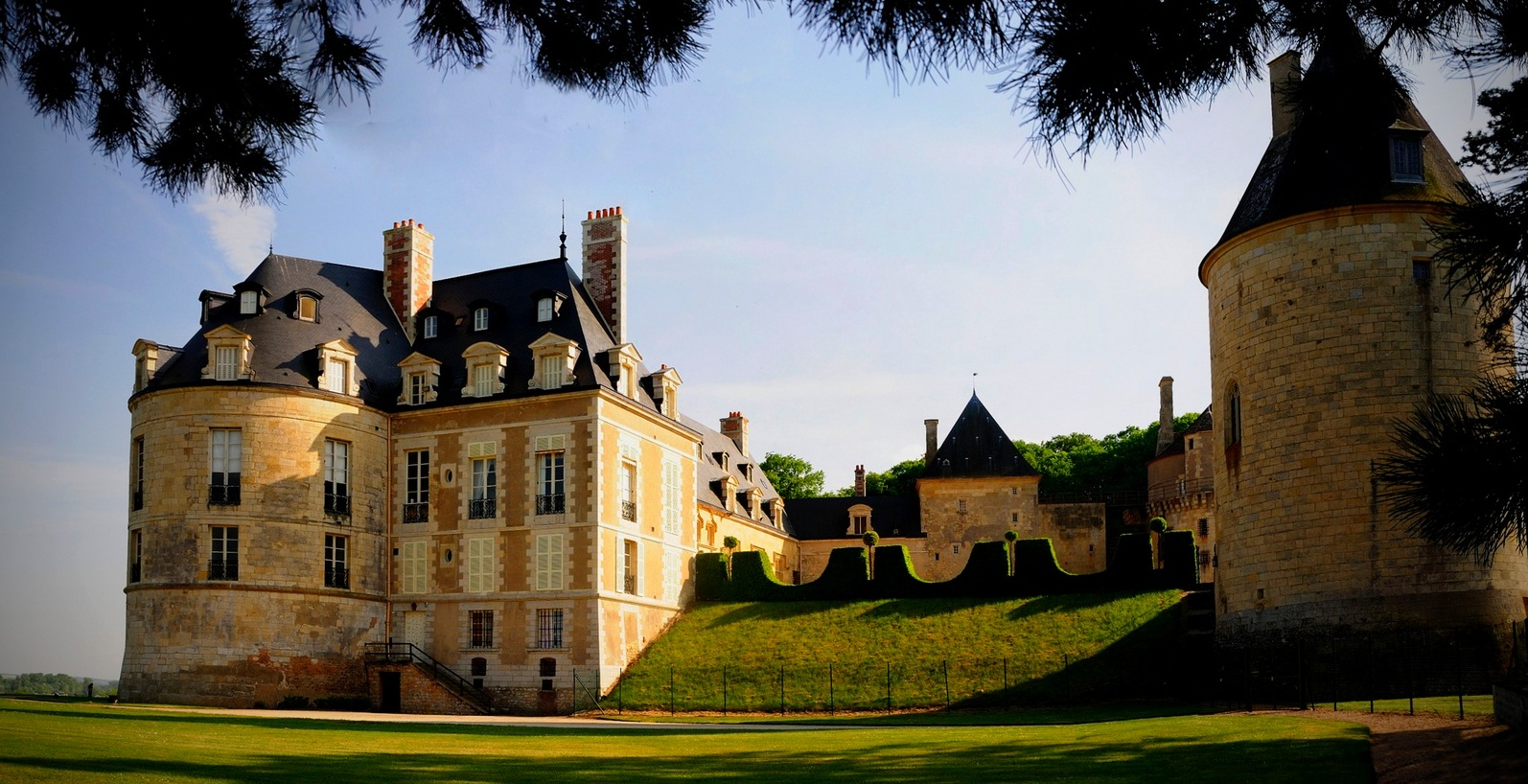

- Location within France

General information
- Coordinates: 46°54′15″N 3°2′50″E

The Château d'Apremont-sur-Allier is a historic castle in Apremont-sur-Allier, France.

== History ==
Built in the second half of the 15th century, the castle has five towers. By the 17th century, another story had been added. At the beginning of the 19th century, stables were built.

In the 1930s, the castle was inherited by Antoinette de Saint-Sauveur, wife of Eugène Schneider, II. From 1934 to 1942, a Mr. de Galéa restored it in the Gothic Revival architectural style. Upon Schneider's death in 1942, the castle was occupied by the Germans. After the war, his widow moved back in and resumed restoration efforts.

In more recent years, the castle has been the residence of the novelist Elvire de Brissac. De Brissac has expanded the forest by planting 400,000 trees, including 300,000 oak trees.

== Architectural significance ==
It has been listed as an official historical monument by the French Ministry of Culture since 1989.

There is a carriage museum in the stables on the castle grounds.
