= Apremont-sur-Allier =

- Commune
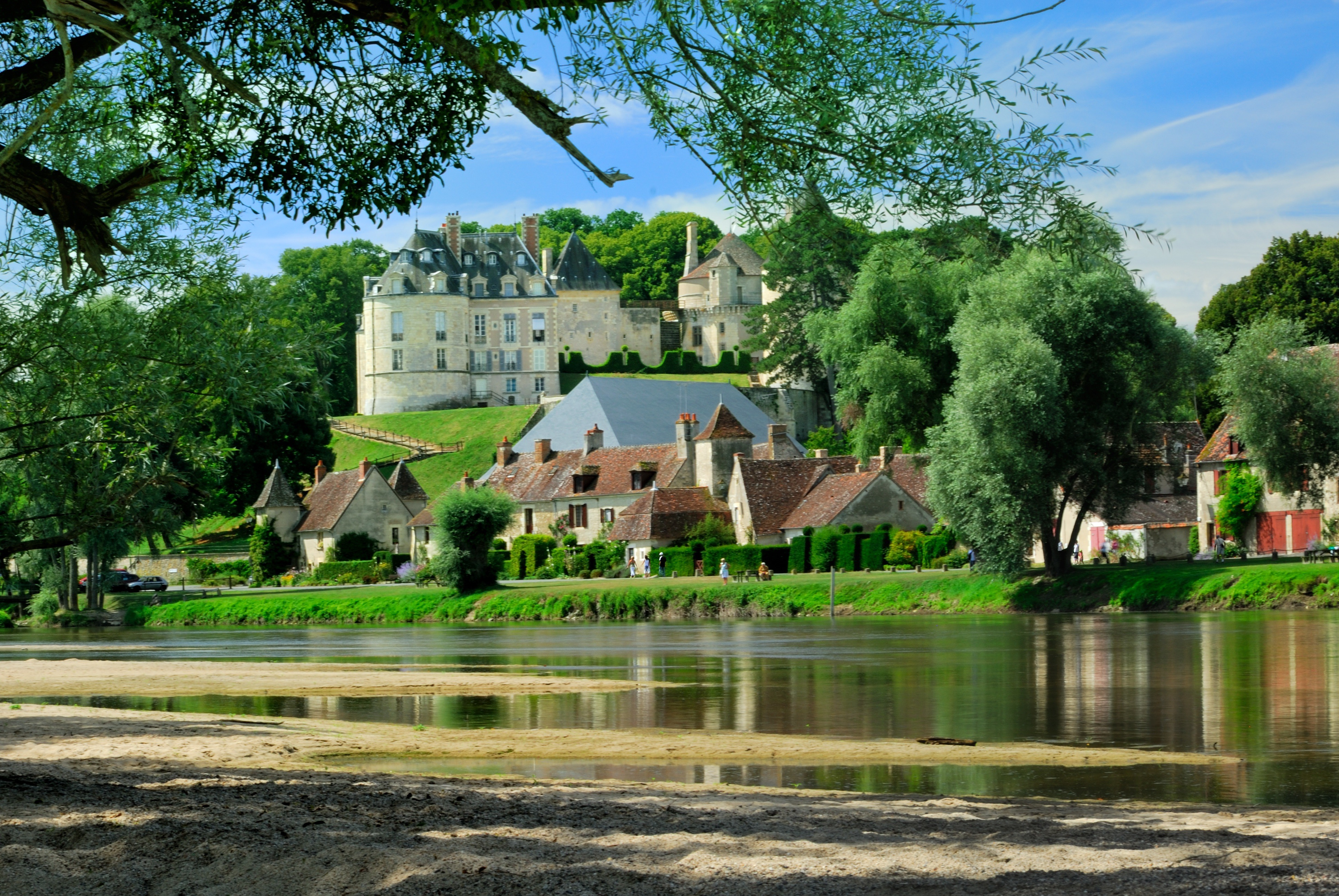
- View of the village with the castle in the background
- Location of Apremont-sur-Allier
- Location within France Location within Centre-Val de Loire
- Coordinates: 46°54′22″N 3°02′53″E
- Country: France
- Region: Centre-Val de Loire
- Department: Cher
- Arrondissement: Saint-Amand-Montrond
- Canton: La Guerche-sur-l'Aubois
- Intercommunality: Portes du Berry, entre Loire et Val d'Aubois

Government
  - Mayor (2020–2026): Nathalie de Bartillat
- Area^{1}: 30.69 km^{2} (11.85 sq mi)
- Elevation: 197 m (646 ft)
- Highest elevation: 226 m (741 ft)
- Lowest elevation: 168 m (551 ft)
- Population (2023): 66
  - Density: 2.2/km^{2} (5.6/sq mi)
- Time zone: UTC+01:00 (CET)
  - Summer (DST): UTC+02:00 (CEST)
- INSEE/Postal code: 18007 /18150
- ^{1} French Land Register data, which excludes lakes, ponds, glaciers > 1 km^{2} (0.386 sq mi or 247 acres) and river estuaries.

Apremont-sur-Allier (French pronunciation: [apʁəmɔ̃ syʁ alje], literally Apremont on Allier) is a commune in the Cher department in the Centre-Val de Loire region of France.

== Geography ==
An area of forestry and farming comprising a small village and two hamlets situated by the west bank of the river Allier, some 35 miles (56 km) southeast of Bourges at the junction of the D100 with the D76 and D45 roads. The river forms the boundary between the commune and the department of Nièvre.

== Population ==
Historical population
Year	Pop.	±% p.a.
1968	180	—
1975	144	−3.14%
1982	106	−4.28%
1990	83	−3.01%
1999	87	+0.52%
2007	77	−1.51%
2012	72	−1.33%
2017	71	−0.28%
2023	66	−1.21%
Source: INSEE

== Sights ==
- The church, dating from the 13th century.
- The Château d'Apremont-sur-Allier, a castle dating from the 15th century and the surrounding "Parc Floral" gardens.
- A carriage museum (Musée des calèches) in the stables of the castle.
- The village is a member of the Les Plus Beaux Villages de France ("The most beautiful villages of France") association.
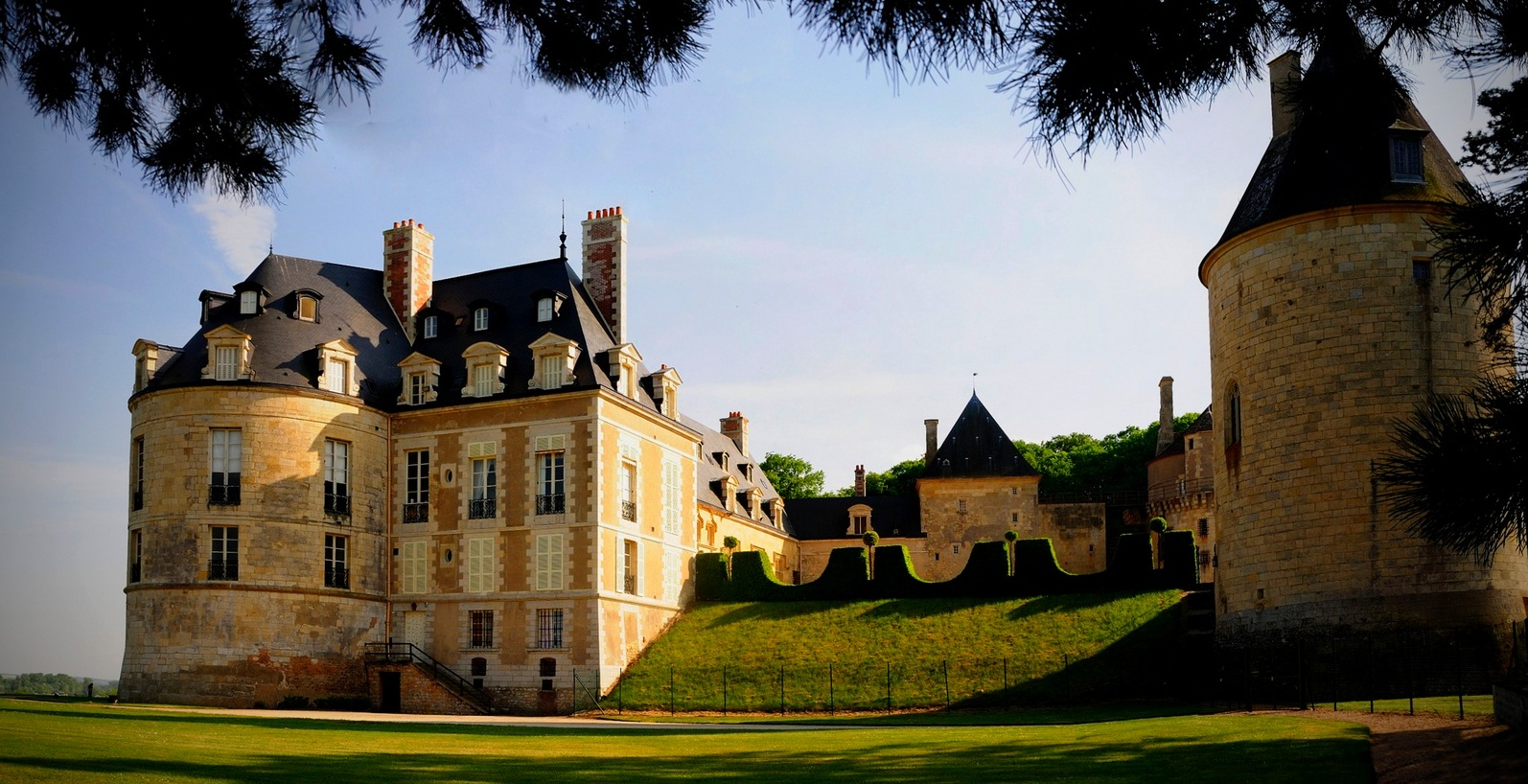
Château d'Apremont-sur-Allier

== See also ==
- Communes of the Cher department
