= Château de la Verrerie (Saône-et-Loire) =

Château in Bourgogne-Franche-Comté, France

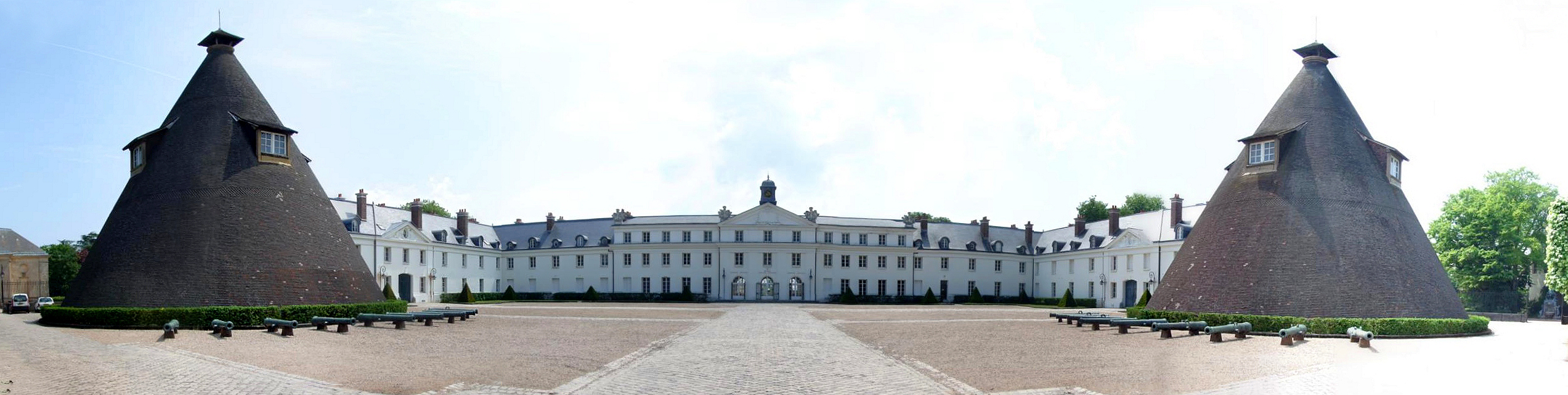

- Location within France

General information
- Coordinates: 46°48′19″N 4°25′24″E

The Château de la Verrerie is a château in Le Creusot, Saône-et-Loire, France.

== History ==
It was built in 1787.

It was acquired by Adolphe Schneider and his brother, Eugène Schneider, co-founders of Schneider-Creusot, in 1837.

== Architectural significance ==
It has been listed as an official historical monument by the French Ministry of Culture since 1984.
