= Lilian Constantini =

French actress (1902–1982)

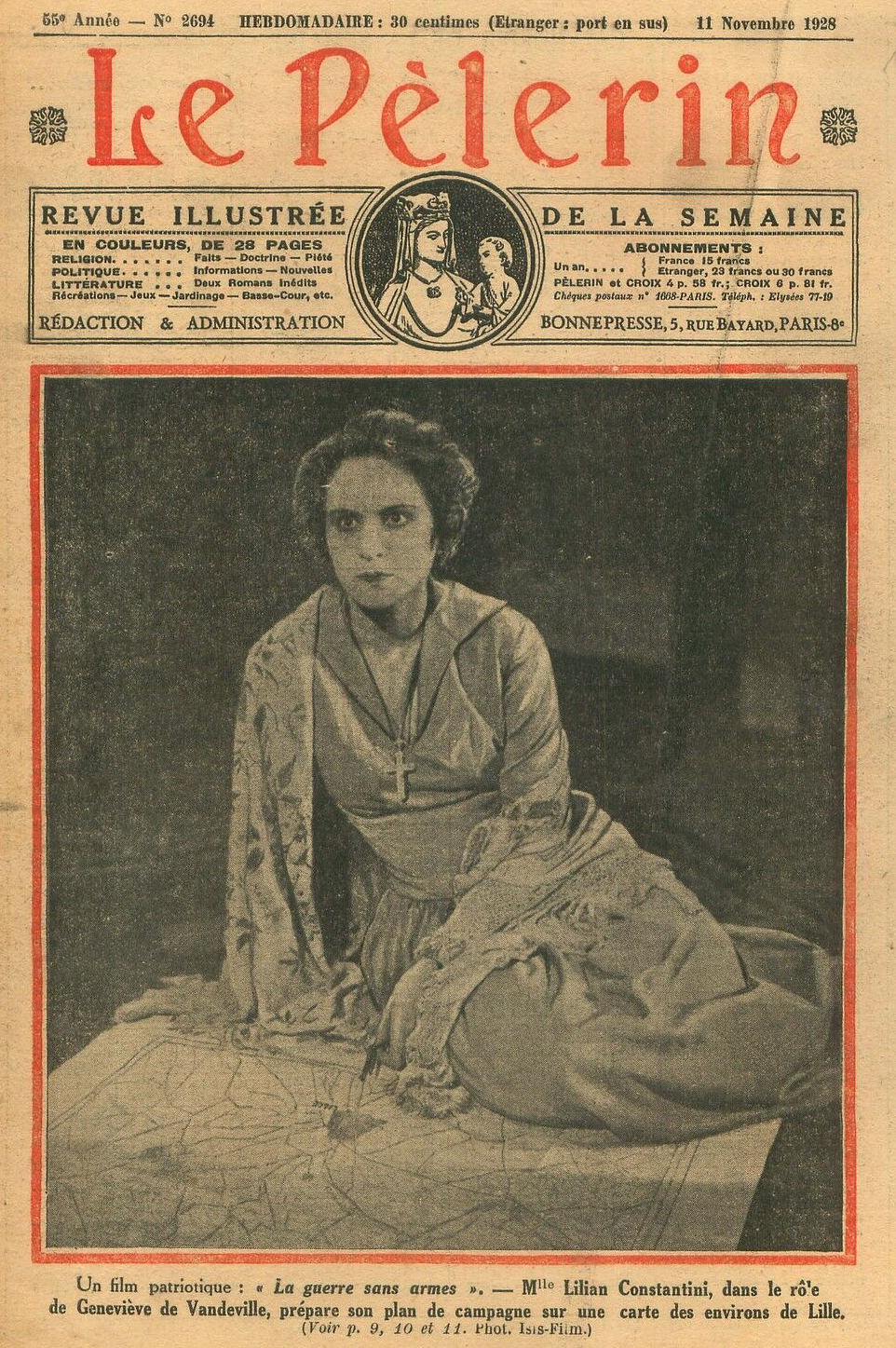
- Lilian Constantini (Le Pèlerin)
- Born: Liliane Louise Hélène Chapiro-Volpert; September 26, 1902; Paris, France
- Died: January 5, 1982 (aged 79); Saint-Tropez, France
- Occupation: Actress
- Spouse: Charles Schneider
- Children: Dominique Schneidre
- Parent(s): Boris Chapiro-Volpert; Louise Guesde
- Relatives: Jules Guesde (maternal grandfather)

Lilian Constantini (September 26, 1902 – January 5, 1982) was a French silent actress in the 1920s and 1930s.

== Early life ==
Liliane Louise Hélène Chapiro-Volpert was born on September 26, 1902, in Paris. Her father, Boris Chapiro-Volpert, was a Russian-born chemist. Her mother was Louise Guesde. Her maternal grandfather, Jules Guesde, was a French journalist and Socialist politician.

== Career ==
She was a silent actress, acting in the 1920s and 1930s. She took the stage name of Lilian Constantini.

== Personal life ==
In 1943, she married Charles Schneider, a businessman who served as the Chairman of Schneider Electric from 1942 to 1960. Their daughter Dominique Schneidre is a novelist. Their other daughter, Catherine Schneider, is a former wife of director Roger Vadim.

== Death ==
She died on January 5, 1982, in Saint-Tropez.

== Filmography ==
- La vivante épingle (dir. Jacques Robert, 1921).
- La bouquetière des innocents (dir. Jacques Robert, 1923).
- Le cousin Pons (dir. Jacques Robert, 1924).
- Naples au baiser de feu (dir. Serge Nadejdine, 1925).
- La chèvre aux pieds d'or (dir. Jacques Robert, 1926).
- En plongée (dir. Jacques Robert, 1926).
- Espionage (dir. Jean Choux, 1928).
- Celles qui s'en font (dir. Germaine Dulac, short film, 1928).
- Chacun porte sa croix (dir. Jean Choux, 1929).
- Sa maman (dir. Gaston Mouru de Lacotte, 1929).
- L'étrange fiancée (dir. Georges Pallu, 1930).
- Crime d'amour (dir. Roger Capellani, 1934).
- Le coup de trois (dir. Jean de Limur, 1936).
