= Duke of Brissac =

Title in the Peerage of France

Cossé-Brissac
- Coat of arms of the family
- Country: France
- Founded: Late Middle Ages
- Current head: Charles-André de Cossé, 14th Duke of Brissac
- Titles: Duke of Brissac; Peer of France; Marquis of Brissac
- Estate: Château de Brissac

Duke of Brissac (French: duc de Brissac) is a title of French nobility in the Peerage of France, which was originally created in 1611 for Charles II de Cossé, Count of Brissac. This title has been held since April 2021 by Charles-André de Cossé (b. 1962), who is the 14th Duke of Brissac. The ancestral home of the ducal family is the Château de Brissac, which is still owned by the family.

== Early history ==
The fief of Brissac in Anjou had been acquired at the end of the 15th century by a French family named Cossé from the same province. René de Cossé (1460-1540) married into the Gouffier family, which was at that time very powerful at court. He was awarded the title of premier panetier to King Louis XII.

Two sons of René de Cossé were prominent French military commanders and became Marshals of France. The fief of Brissac was assigned the status of a County in 1560 and allotted to René's elder son, Charles de Cossé, Count of Brissac, who was grand master of artillery and governor of Piedmont and Picardy. It was he who introduced the Italian violin to the French court. The second son of René was Artus de Cossé (1512-1582), who held the offices of Grand Panetier of France and superintendent of finance, and he distinguished himself in the French Wars of Religion.

The younger son of Charles de Cossé, Count of Brissac, was Charles II de Cossé. He fought for the Catholic League and, as military governor of Paris, opened the gates of that city to Henry IV, who appointed him Marshal of France in 1594. The County of Brissac was raised in status to a Duchy in the Peerage of France in 1611. At that point, Charles II de Cossé became the first Duke of Brissac.

== Subsequent history ==
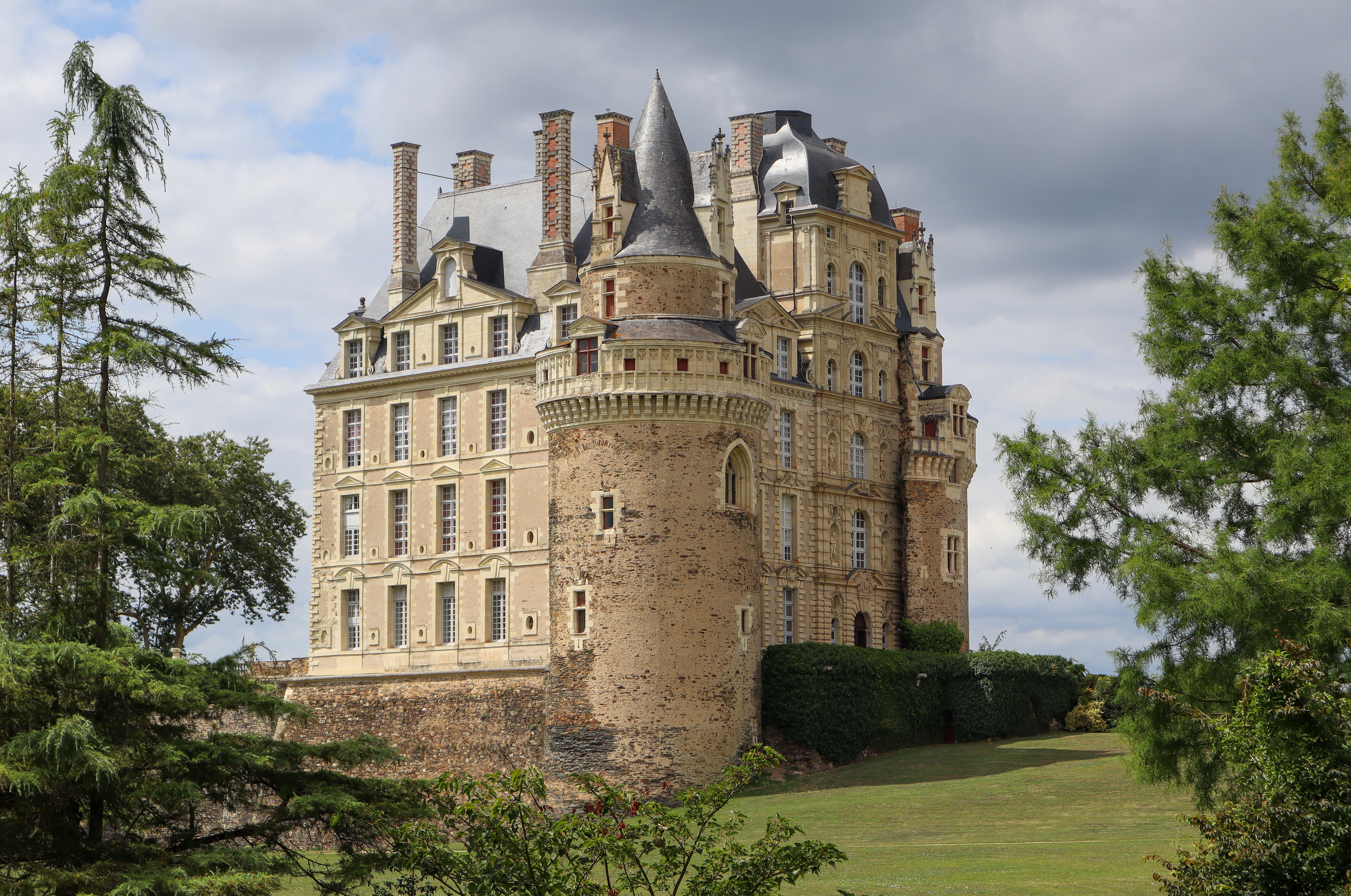
Château de Brissac, residence of the family

Notable Dukes of Brissac include Jean Paul Timoléon de Cossé-Brissac, who was the seventh Duke of Brissac and a Grand Panetier of France. He was a French general during the reign of King Louis XV and was noteworthy for leading the French vanguard at the Battle of Minden, after which he became a Marshal of France.

The seventh Duke of Brissac was eventually succeeded by his second son, Louis Hercule Timoléon de Cossé-Brissac. Noted for his devotion to Louis XVI, Brissac served as the commander of the briefly established Constitutional Guard of the King. On 9 September 1792, he was killed during the September Massacres at Versailles. His body was butchered and his head severed. The head was wrapped in a cloth and carried by a peasant mob to the Château de Louveciennes where it was thrown through an open window, landing in the salon of his lover, Madame du Barry.

After the death of Louis-Hercule in 1792 without a living male-line descendant, the ducal title passed to Timoléon de Cossé-Brissac (1775–1848). He was the eldest son of Hyacinthe-Hugues de Cossé-Brissac, Duke of Cossé (1746–1813), whose father was René-Hugues de Cossé-Brissac, Count of Cossé (1702–1754). René-Hugues was the third son of Artus de Cossé-Brissac, 5th Duke of Brissac (1668–1709), the father of the 6th and 7th Dukes of Brissac. After Timoléon de Cossé-Brissac died in 1848, the ducal title was held by his successive descendants in the male line, including François, 11th Duke of Brissac, Pierre, 12th Duke of Brissac, and François, 13th Duke of Brissac.

The current holder of the ducal title is Charles-André de Cossé-Brissac, 14th Duke of Brissac. The heir apparent to this title is his eldest son, Laszlo de Cossé-Brissac, Marquis of Brissac.

== Dukes of Brissac ==
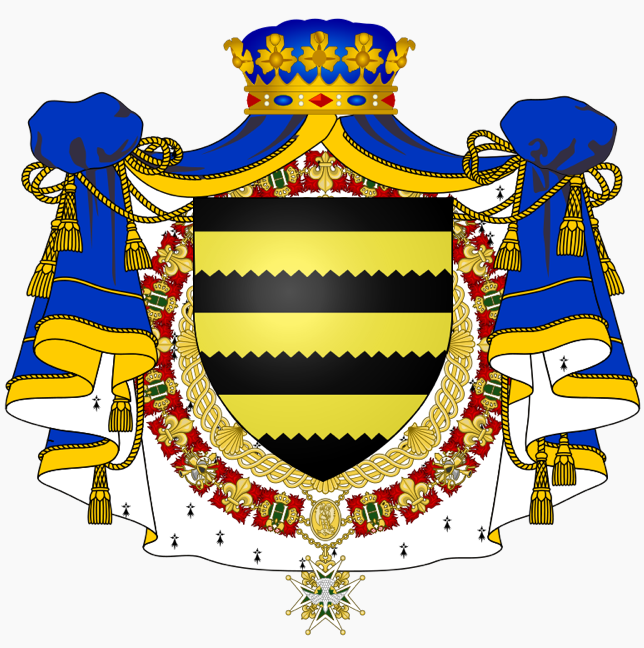
Arms of the Dukes of Brissac, with the blue mantle and bonnet of a peer, and the collars of the ordres du roi

=== First creation ===
1. 1611-1621 Charles de Cossé, 1st Duke of Brissac.
2. 1621-1651 François de Cossé, 2nd Duke of Brissac (son of the above)
3. 1651-1661 Louis de Cossé, 3rd Duke of Brissac (son of the above)
4. 1661-1698 Henri Albert de Cossé, 4th Duke of Brissac (son of the above)
5. 1698-1702 Artus Timoléon Louis de Cossé 5th Duke of Brissac (cousin of the above)
6. 1702-1732 Charles Timoléon Louis de Cossé, 6th Duke of Brissac (son of the above)
7. 1732-1756 Jean Paul Timoléon de Cossé 7th Duke of Brissac (brother of the above)
8. 1756-1759 Louis Joseph Timoléon de Cossé, 8th Duke of Brissac (called the Duke of Cossé), (son of the above)
9. 1759-1792 Louis Hercule Timoléon de Cossé, 8th Duke of Brissac (son of the above)

=== Second creation ===
During the First Restoration, in an application ratified on 4 June 1814, Louis XVIII revived the peerage before it was restored as a hereditary peerage in 1817.

1. 1814-1848 Timoléon de Cossé, 9th Duke of Brissac (cousin of the above)
2. 1848-1883 Marie Arthur Timoléon de Cossé, 10th Duke of Brissac (son of the above)
3. 1883-1944 François de Cossé, 11th Duke of Brissac (grandson of the above)
4. 1944-1993 Pierre de Cossé, 12th Duke of Brissac (son of the above)
5. 1993-2021 François de Cossé, 13th Duke of Brissac (son of the above)
6. Since 2021 Charles-André de Cossé, 14th Duke of Brissac (son of the above)

== See also ==
- Dukes in France
- List of French dukedoms
