= Henri Schneider =

French businessman and politician

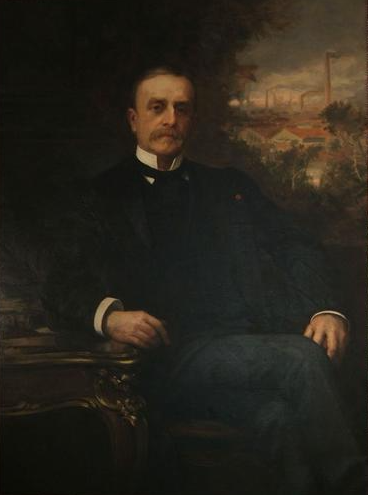
- Born: Henri Adolphe Eugène Schneider; 18 December 1840; Le Creusot, France
- Died: 17 May 1898 (aged 57); Paris, France
- Occupations: Businessman, politician
- Children: Eugène Schneider II
- Parent: Joseph Eugène Schneider
- Relatives: Adolphe Schneider (uncle); Jacques de Juigné (son-in-law)

Henri Adolphe Eugène Schneider (18 December 1840 – 17 May 1898) was a French businessman and politician. He served as a member of the Chamber of Deputies from 1889 to 1898.

Henri Schneider was born in Le Creusot, rural France. His father, Eugène Schneider, had co-founded Schneider-Creusot with his uncle, Adolphe Schneider, in 1836. Henri took over control of Le Creusot on his father's death in 1875.

In 1882, he was elected an honorary member of the American Society of Mechanical Engineers, which noted his contributions to steel manufacturing and the development of steel plate for naval armor. In 1889 he was awarded the Bessemer Gold Medal of the British Iron and Steel Institute for his services to the iron and steel trade of France.

He died in 1898 in Paris, France. His statue in the centre of Le Creusot, designed by Emile Peynot, was dedicated in 1923.

Control of the Le Creusot foundry passed to his son Eugène Schneider, who he had taken into partnership in 1887.
