= Château de Brissac =

French château in the Brissac-Quincé area

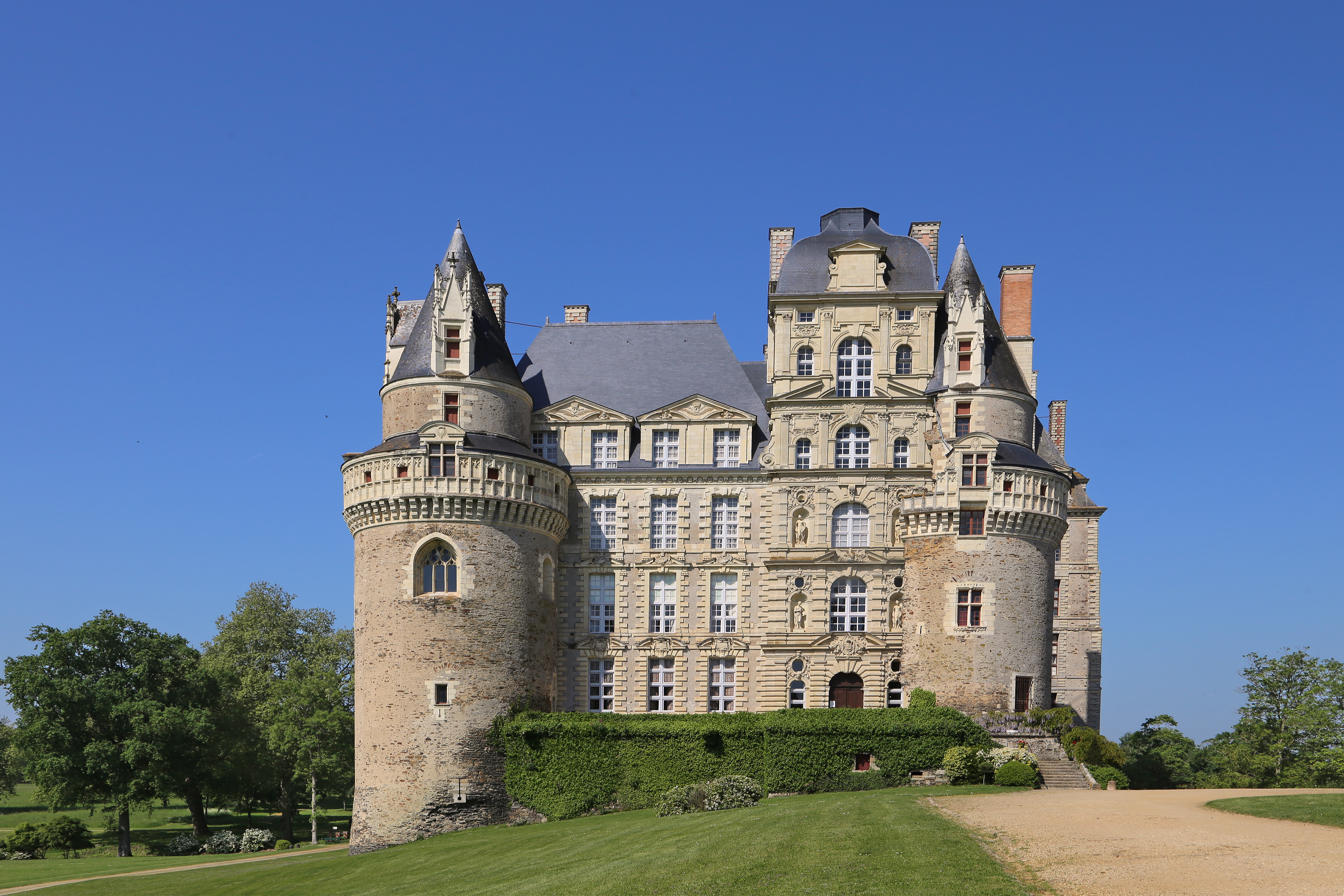
- Main façade of the Château de Brissac

- Location within France

General information
- Status: Extant
- Type: Château, fortress
- Architectural style: Medieval, Renaissance
- Location: Brissac Loire Aubance, Maine-et-Loire, France, 49320 Brissac-Quincé, France
- Coordinates: 47°25′10″N 00°26′59″W
- Current tenants: Museum, private residence
- Construction started: 11th century
- Completed: 17th century
- Client: Foulques Nerra
- Owner: Charles-André de Cossé-Brissac, 14th Duke of Brissac

Technical details
- Floor count: 7

Website
- Official site of the Chateau de Brissac

Monument historique
- Type: Classé
- Designated: 1958, 1966

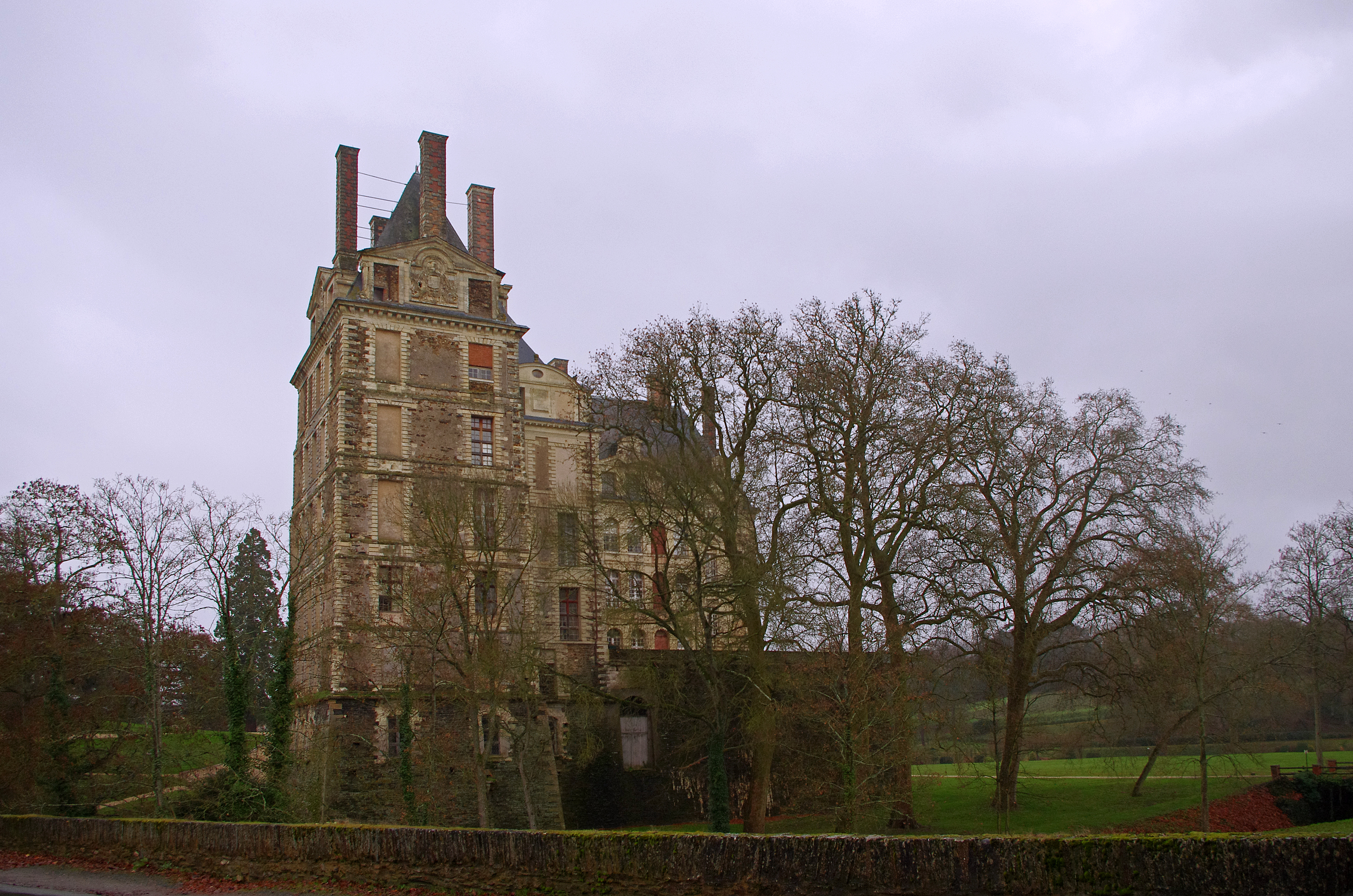
West elevation

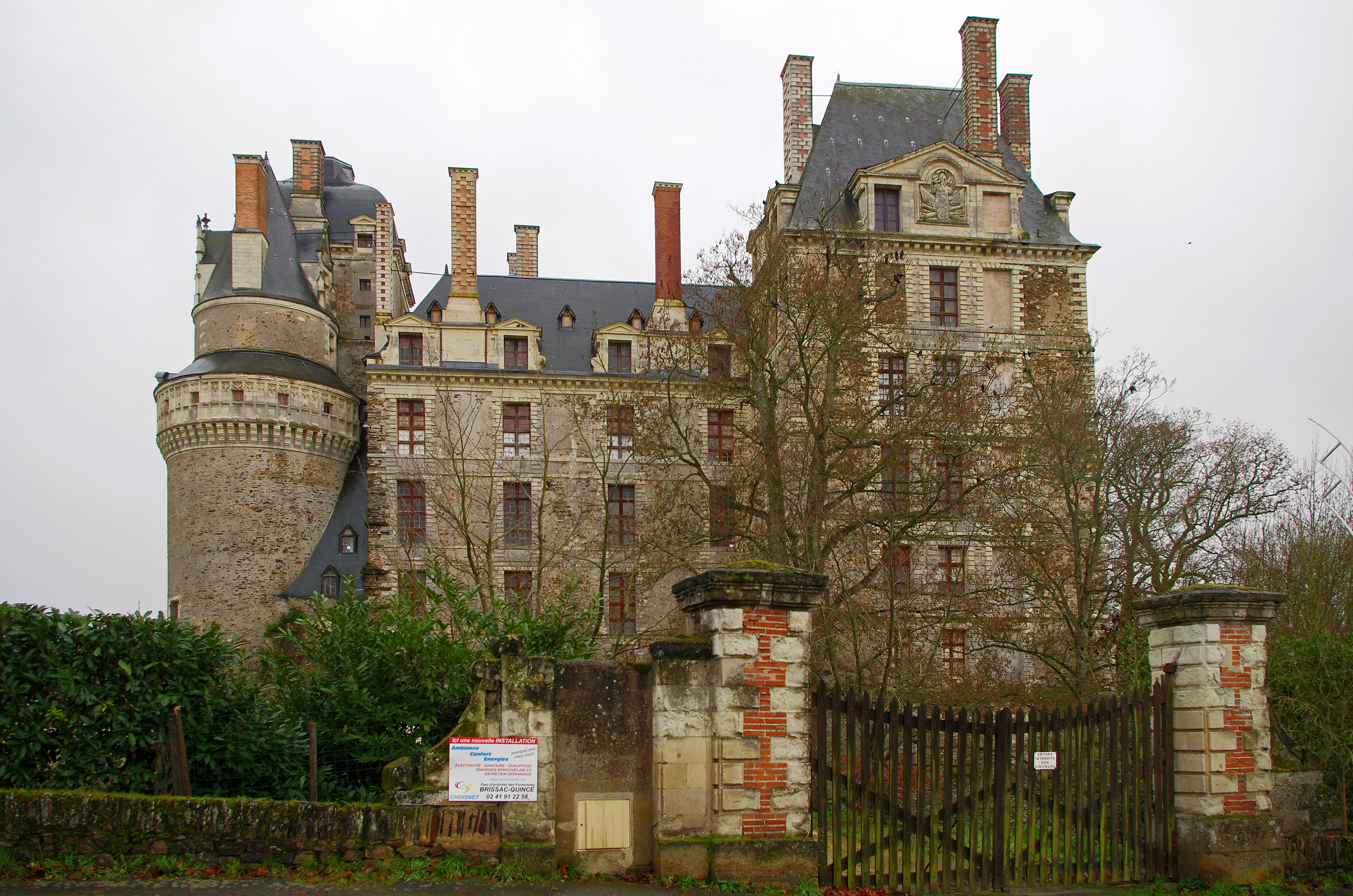
North elevation

The Château de Brissac is a French château in the Brissac-Quincé area of the commune of Brissac Loire Aubance, located in the department of Maine-et-Loire, France. The property is owned by the noble Cossé family, whose head bears the French hereditary title of Duke of Brissac. The château is listed as a monument historique by the French Ministry of Culture.

== History ==
The château was originally built as a castle by the Counts of Anjou in the 11th century. After the victory over the English by King Philip II of France, he gave the property to Guillaume des Roches. In the 15th century, the structure was rebuilt by Pierre de Brézé, a wealthy chief minister to King Charles VII of France. During the reign (1515–47) of King Francis I, the property was acquired by René de Cossé, who was named by the King as governor of Anjou and Maine.

During the French Wars of Religion, the château was made a possession in 1589 by the Protestant leader, Henry of Navarre. Severely damaged, the fortress was scheduled to be demolished. However, Charles II de Cossé sided with Henry of Navarre, who soon was crowned King of France. In gratitude, King Henry gave him the property, the noble title of Duke of Brissac and the money to rebuild the château in 1611.

Its construction made it the tallest château in France, and its façade reflects the influences of the 17th century's Baroque architecture. Through marriage, the Cossé-Brissac family also acquired the Château Montreuil-Bellay but later sold it.

In August 1620, King Louis XIII and his mother, Marie de Medici, met to discuss their differences in the "neutral" territory of the Château de Brissac. A temporary truce between the two was reached. Still, it did not last long, and the Queen Mother was eventually banished.

The descendants of the first Duke of Brissac maintained the château until 1792 when the property was ransacked during the French Revolution. It lay in waste until a restoration program began in 1844 and was carried on by subsequent Dukes of Brissac.

== The château today ==
Today, the Château de Brissac is still owned by the Cossé-Brissac family. The property is currently managed by Charles-André de Cossé, 14th Duke of Brissac (b. 1962), who is the elder son of François de Cossé, 13th Duke of Brissac (1929–2021).

The château has seven stories altogether, making it the tallest château in the Loire Valley. The Château de Brissac is open to the public for tours and overnight stays in its guest rooms, and the luxurious gilded theatre hosts the annual Val de Loire festival. It was also used until recently as a location for the Brazilian celebrity magazine Caras.

== In popular culture ==
During the mid-1990s, the château was prominently featured as the temporary stadium for the Iron Chef French Battles of the original Japanese Iron Chef television show. Two battles were staged at the Château de Brissac and aired in Japan on April 12, 1996. The first battle, with the theme ingredient salmon, was between Bernard Leprince and Iron Chef Japanese Koumei Nakamura, and it was won by Leprince. At the time, Leprince was the chef at La Tour d'Argent in Paris. The second battle was between Pierre Gagnaire and Iron Chef French Hiroyuki Sakai, with the theme ingredient lobster, and it was won by Gagnaire.

The château was also featured in the Japanese visual novel version of Fate/Stay Night.

== See also ==
- List of castles in France
- List of castles in the Pays de la Loire
