= Charles Schneider (businessman) =

French businessman (1898–1960)

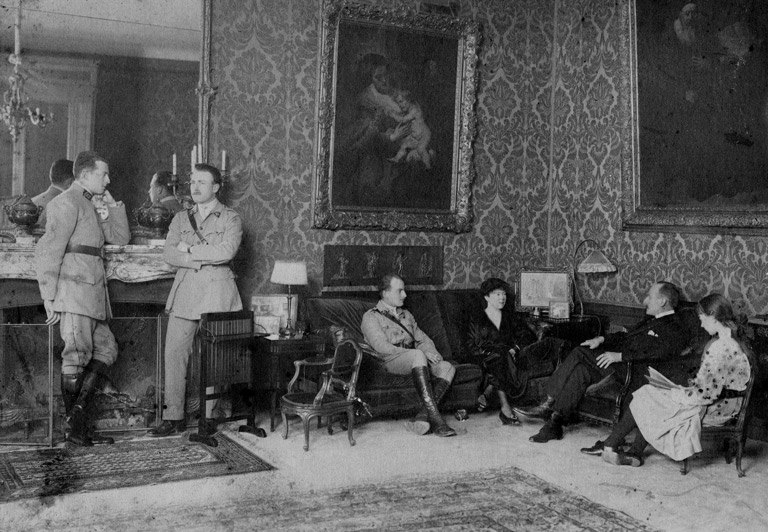
- Born: Charles Marie Bernard Henri Schneider; June 28, 1898; Paris, France
- Died: August 6, 1960 (aged 62); Saint-Tropez, France
- Occupation: Businessman
- Spouse: Lilian Constantini
- Children: Dominique Schneidre
- Parent(s): Eugène Schneider, II; Antoinette de Rafélis de Saint-Sauveur
- Relatives: Jean Schneider (brother); Germaine Dulac (cousin)

Charles Schneider (June 28, 1898 – August 6, 1960) was a French businessman. He served as the Chairman of Schneider Electric from 1942 to 1960.

== Early life ==
Charles Schneider was born on June 28, 1898, in Paris, France. His father was Eugène Schneider, II. His mother was Antoinette de Rafélis de Saint-Sauveur. He had two brothers, Henri-Paul and Jean, and a sister, Marie-Zélie. His cousin, Germaine Dulac, was a filmmaker.

During World War I, he served in the French Army from 1916 to 1918, retiring as Second Lieutenant. He received the Croix de Guerre for his service.

== Career ==
Schneider became a co-manager of the family business with his brother Jean in 1918. However, due to managerial disagreements with their father, they were fired in 1924. As a result, Schneider worked for Gaumont.

In February 1942, Schneider was appointed as an official at the Comité d’ORganization de la SIDérurgie (later known as the Comité des forges). After his father's death in November 1942, he became the co-Chairman of the family business with his brother Jean. From his brother's death in 1944 to 1960, he served as its sole Chairman.

== Personal life ==
He married Lilian Constantini, an actress, in 1943. Their daughter Dominique Schneidre is a novelist. Their other daughter, Catherine Schneider, was formerly married to director Roger Vadim.

== Death ==
He died on August 6, 1960, in Saint-Tropez.
