= Le Creusot =

- Commune
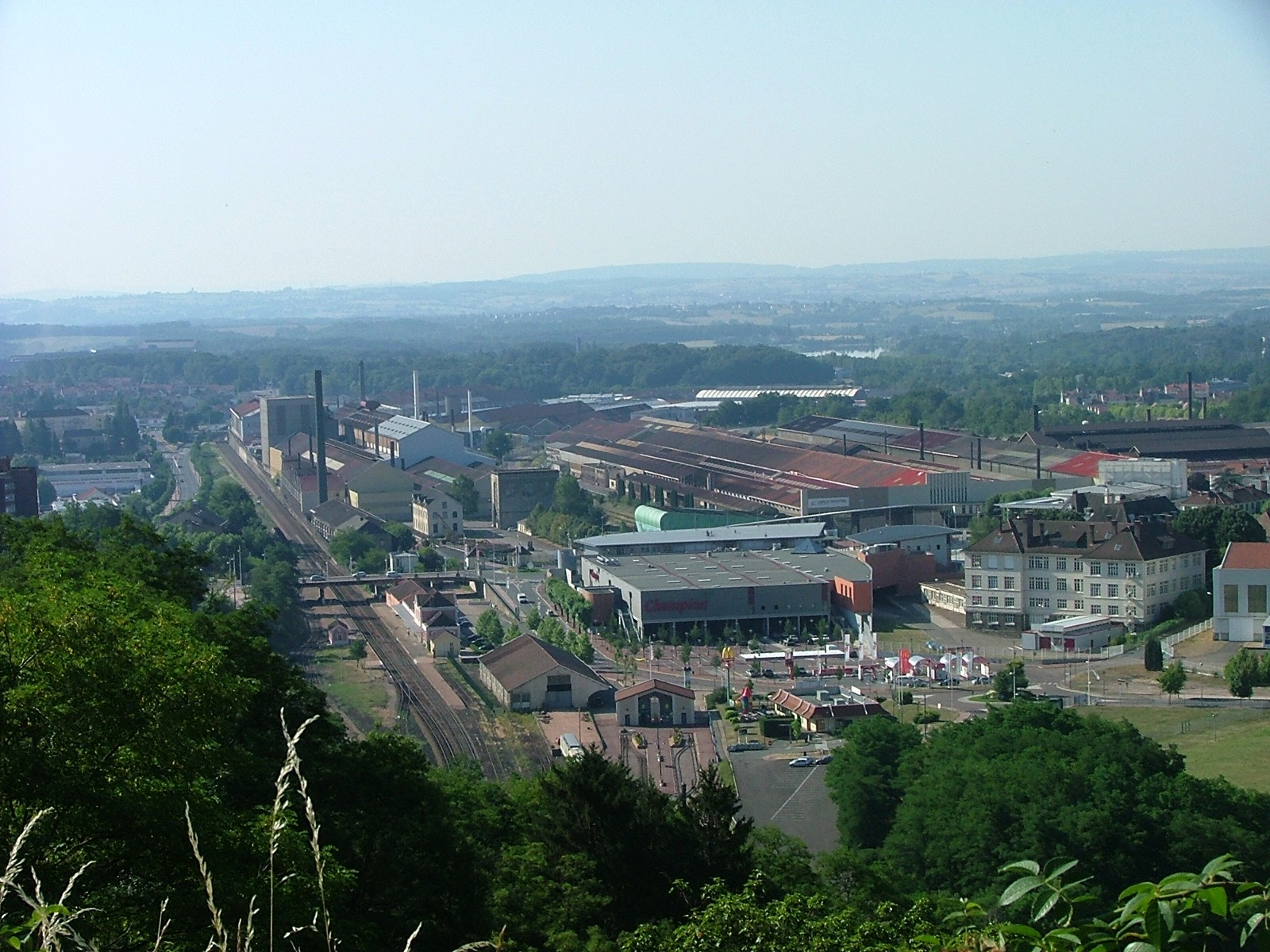
- Steel factory

- Coat of arms
- Location of Le Creusot
- Location within France Location within Bourgogne-Franche-Comté
- Coordinates: 46°48′05″N 4°26′28″E
- Country: France
- Region: Bourgogne-Franche-Comté
- Department: Saône-et-Loire
- Arrondissement: Autun
- Canton: Le Creusot-1 and 2
- Intercommunality: CU Creusot Montceau

Government
  - Mayor (2020–2026): David Marti
- Area^{1}: 18.11 km^{2} (6.99 sq mi)
- Elevation: 347 m (1,138 ft)
- Highest elevation: 516 m (1,693 ft)
- Lowest elevation: 316 m (1,037 ft)
- Population (2023): 20,509
  - Density: 1,132/km^{2} (2,933/sq mi)
- Time zone: UTC+01:00 (CET)
  - Summer (DST): UTC+02:00 (CEST)
- INSEE/Postal code: 71153 /71200
- ^{1} French Land Register data, which excludes lakes, ponds, glaciers > 1 km^{2} (0.386 sq mi or 247 acres) and river estuaries.

Le Creusot (French pronunciation: [lə kʁøzo]) is a commune and industrial town in the Saône-et-Loire department, region of Bourgogne-Franche-Comté, eastern France.

The inhabitants are known as Creusotins. Formerly a mining town, its economy is now dominated by metallurgical companies such as ArcelorMittal, Schneider Electric, and Alstom.

Since the 1990s, the town has been developing its tourism credentials. Its main attraction is the Parc des Combes. The Creusot steam hammer is displayed as a tourist attraction in a square at the entrance to the town from the south.

Le Creusot is also the second educational centre of the Bourgogne (after Dijon), with its IUT and the Condorcet university centre.

== History ==
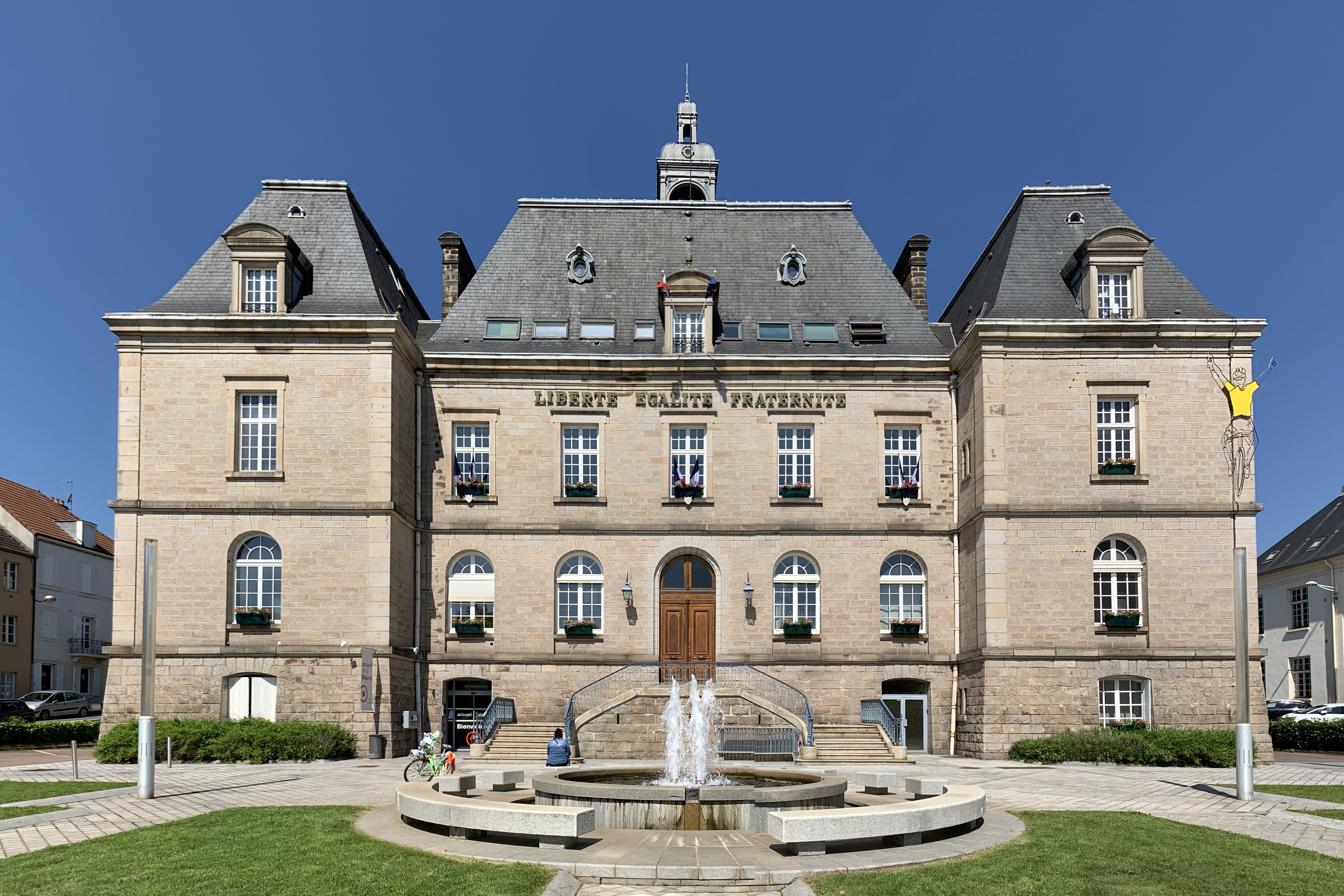
The Hôtel de Ville

In 1836, iron ore mines and forges around Le Creusot were bought by Adolphe Schneider and his brother Eugène. They developed a business in steel, railways, armaments, and shipbuilding. The Schneider empire developed much of the town itself, until it was much reduced in the second half of the twentieth century. It eventually became known as Schneider Electric. The steel forgings for the French nuclear power plants as well as the special alloys for the TGV trains were manufactured in Le Creusot.

The Hôtel de Ville was completed in 1901.

On 17 October 1942 the Schneider factory was targeted by the RAF in a daylight raid designated Operation Robinson.

== Population ==
Historical population

Year	Pop.	±% p.a.
1793	1,545	—
1800	1,145	−4.19%
1806	1,332	+2.55%
1821	1,218	−0.59%
1831	1,334	+0.91%
1836	2,700	+15.14%
1841	4,012	+8.24%
1846	6,303	+9.46%
1851	8,083	+5.10%
1856	13,390	+10.62%
1861	16,094	+3.75%
1866	23,872	+8.20%
1872	22,890	−0.70%
1876	26,432	+3.66%
1881	28,125	+1.25%
1886	27,301	−0.59%
1891	28,635	+0.96%
1896	32,034	+2.27%
1901	30,584	−0.92%

Year	Pop.	±% p.a.
1906	33,437	+1.80%
1911	35,587	+1.25%
1921	38,396	+0.76%
1926	32,419	−3.33%
1931	32,034	−0.24%
1936	29,417	−1.69%
1946	24,106	−1.97%
1954	28,663	+2.19%
1962	33,737	+2.06%
1968	34,102	+0.18%
1975	33,366	−0.31%
1982	32,149	−0.53%
1990	28,909	−1.32%
1999	26,283	−1.05%
2007	23,793	−1.24%
2012	22,574	−1.05%
2017	21,630	−0.85%
2023	20,509	−0.88%

Source: EHESS and INSEE (1968–2023)

== Transport ==
About 5 km (3 mi) south-east of town centre is the Le Creusot TGV station, a train station on the LGV Sud-Est line, which links the area to Paris, Lyon and beyond with high-speed rail. Le Creusot station is closer to the city centre, and is served by regional trains towards Nevers, Montchanin and Dijon.

== Sights ==
- Le pilon – 1877 steam hammer invented by François Bourdon

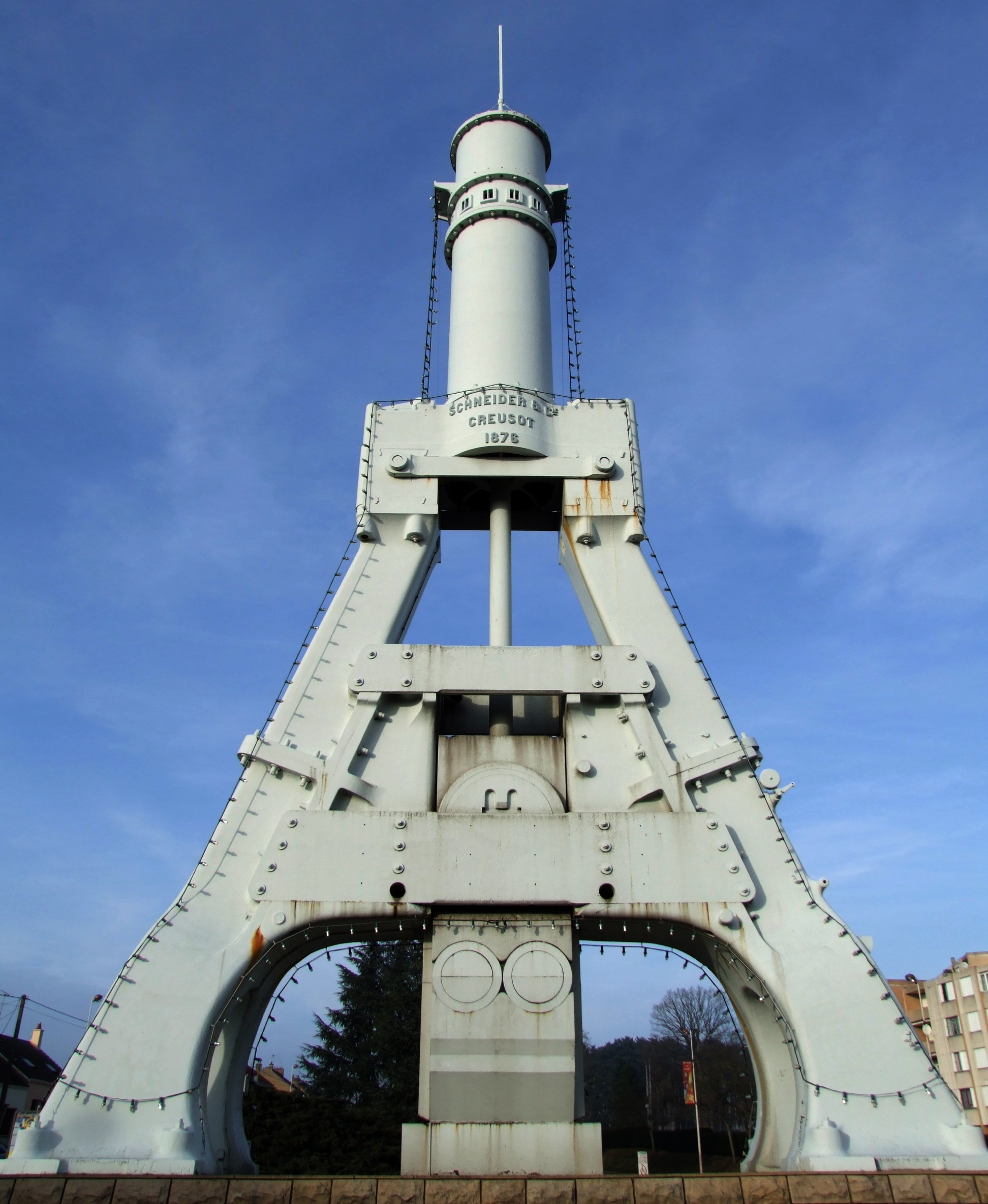
Le pilon

- Château de la Verrerie – Originally the Cristallerie royale of Queen Marie-Antoinette

== Personalities ==
- André Billardon (b. 1940), mayor
- Christian Bobin (b. 1951), writer
- François Bourdon (1797–1875), engineer and inventor of the steam hammer le pilon
- Fr. Bruno Cadoré (b. 1954), Dominican priest and current Master of the Order
- Mathilde Carré (1908–2007), French Resistance agent during World War II, who turned double agent
- Marie-Pierre Casey (b. 1937), actress
- Jovan Deroko (1912–1941), Serbian Chetnik fighter during World War II
- Sébastien Grax (b. 1984), footballer
- Claudie Haigneré (b. 1957), astronaut
- Catherine Lépront (1951–2012), writer
- Adolphe Schneider (1802–1845), mine owner and entrepreneur
- Eugène Schneider (1805–1875), mine owner and entrepreneur
- Lucien Sergi (b. 1971), former professional footballer
- Anthony da Silva (b. 1980), footballer
- Mickaël Vendetta (b. 1987), Internet celebrity
- John "Iron-Mad" Wilkinson (1728 – 1808), advised Le Creusot on the development of its iron industry
- Marie-Alice Yahé (b. 1984), female rugby player
- Deng Xiaoping (1904–1997), Chinese leader who briefly worked at the Le Creusot Iron and Steel Plant in the 1920s

== International relations ==
Le Creusot is twinned with:

- Ghimbav, Romania
- Blieskastel, Germany
- Rumia, Poland

== Climate ==
Climate data for Le Creusot-Saint-Symphorien-de-Marmagne, elevation 349 m (1,145 ft), (1991–2020 normals, extremes 1974–present)
Month	Jan	Feb	Mar	Apr	May	Jun	Jul	Aug	Sep	Oct	Nov	Dec	Year
Record high °C (°F)	17.0 (62.6)	21.0 (69.8)	25.0 (77.0)	29.0 (84.2)	32.0 (89.6)	38.0 (100.4)	42.0 (107.6)	40.0 (104.0)	37.0 (98.6)	29.1 (84.4)	22.6 (72.7)	18.0 (64.4)	42.0 (107.6)
Mean daily maximum °C (°F)	6.3 (43.3)	8.0 (46.4)	12.5 (54.5)	16.0 (60.8)	19.8 (67.6)	23.9 (75.0)	26.3 (79.3)	26.0 (78.8)	21.6 (70.9)	16.3 (61.3)	10.2 (50.4)	6.9 (44.4)	16.1 (61.0)
Daily mean °C (°F)	3.1 (37.6)	4.0 (39.2)	7.3 (45.1)	10.3 (50.5)	14.1 (57.4)	17.8 (64.0)	19.8 (67.6)	19.4 (66.9)	15.6 (60.1)	11.7 (53.1)	6.5 (43.7)	3.8 (38.8)	11.1 (52.0)
Mean daily minimum °C (°F)	0.0 (32.0)	0.0 (32.0)	2.2 (36.0)	4.6 (40.3)	8.4 (47.1)	11.6 (52.9)	13.2 (55.8)	12.9 (55.2)	9.7 (49.5)	7.0 (44.6)	2.9 (37.2)	0.7 (33.3)	6.1 (43.0)
Record low °C (°F)	−22.0 (−7.6)	−22.0 (−7.6)	−12.5 (9.5)	−6.0 (21.2)	−3.5 (25.7)	1.5 (34.7)	2.0 (35.6)	3.0 (37.4)	−2.0 (28.4)	−6.5 (20.3)	−11.5 (11.3)	−17.0 (1.4)	−22.0 (−7.6)
Average precipitation mm (inches)	91.1 (3.59)	74.3 (2.93)	72.2 (2.84)	73.5 (2.89)	90.1 (3.55)	69.7 (2.74)	69.1 (2.72)	67.6 (2.66)	70.6 (2.78)	87.3 (3.44)	106.4 (4.19)	102.5 (4.04)	974.4 (38.36)
Average precipitation days (≥ 1.0 mm)	13.1	11.4	10.8	10.8	11.7	9.4	9.0	8.3	9.0	11.7	13.3	14.3	132.8
Source: Meteociel

== See also ==
- Communes of the Saône-et-Loire department
- Le Creusot Commune
