= Louis Hercule Timoléon de Cossé, 8th Duke of Brissac =

French military commander (1734–1792)

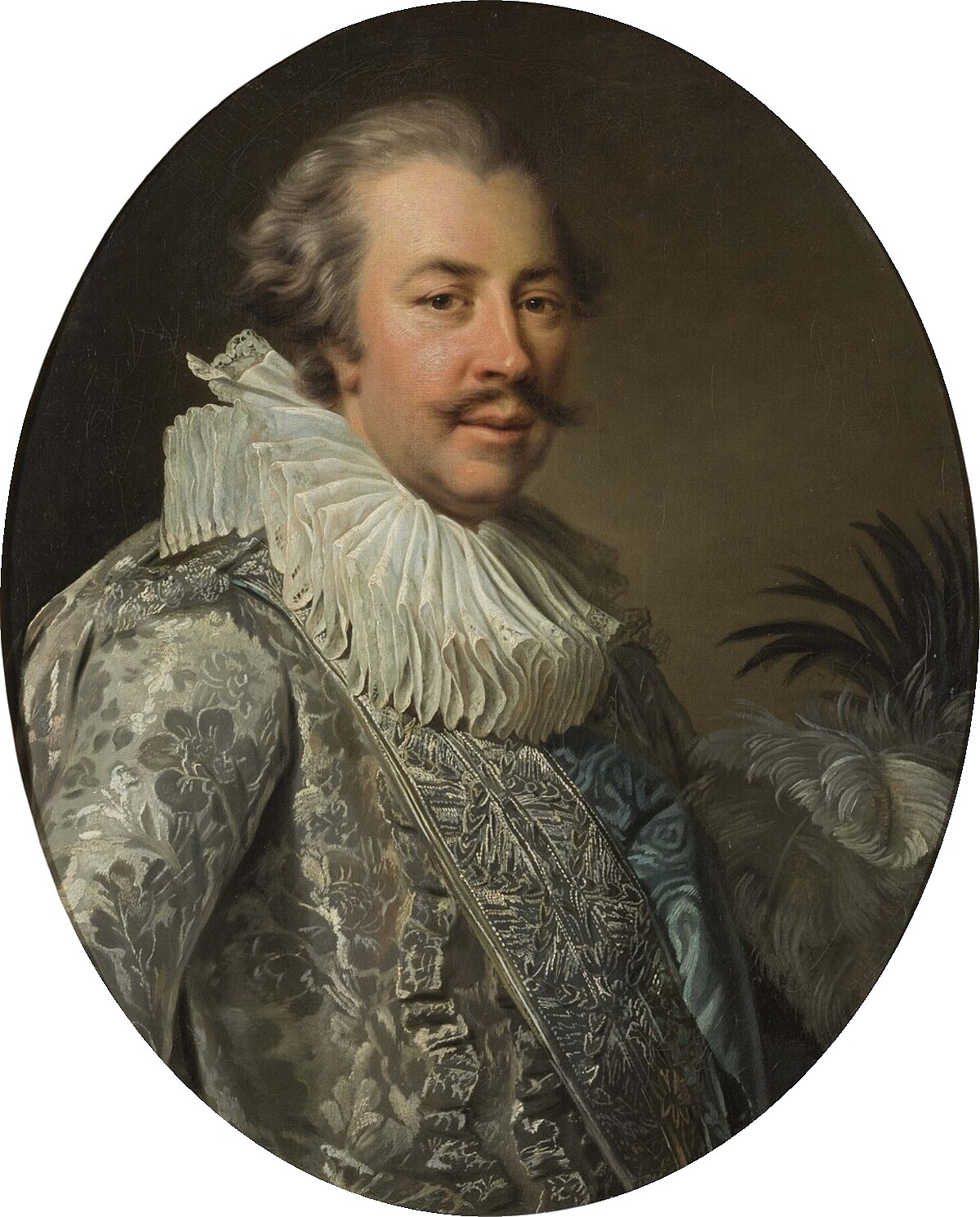
Portrait of the Duke of Brissac

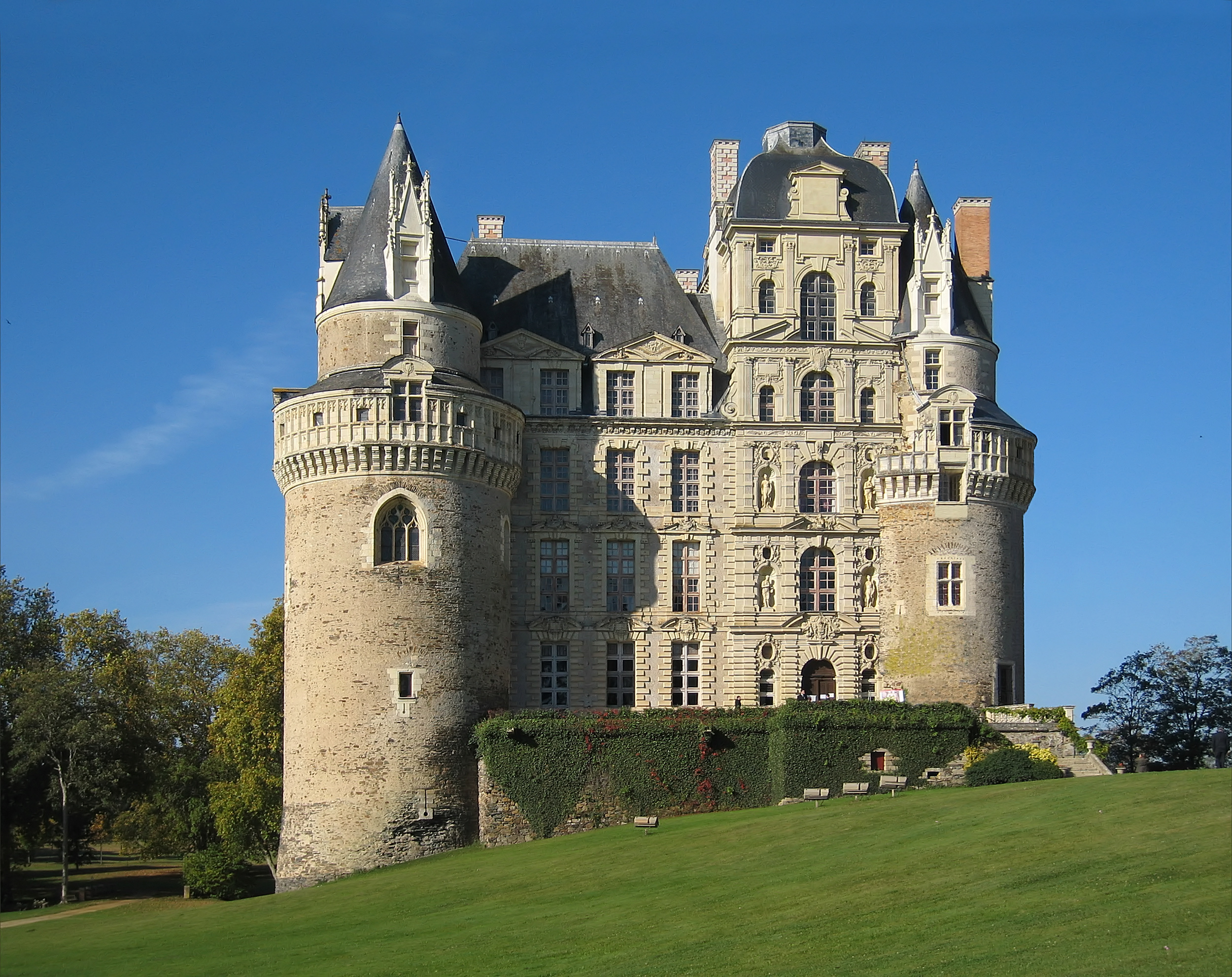
Château de Brissac

Louis Hercule Timoléon de Cossé, 8th Duke of Brissac (14 February 1734 – 9 September 1792), was a French military commander and peer of France. He was the second son and eventual heir of Jean Paul Timoléon de Cossé, 7th Duke of Brissac, who was a Marshal of France.

== Life and career ==
One of the most prominent men at the courts of Louis XV and Louis XVI, he was a Grand Panetier of France, governor of Paris, capitaine colonel of the Cent-Suisses of the Garde du Roi, and a knight in various orders. In his later years, he became the fond lover of Louis XV's last mistress, Madame du Barry.

In 1791, he became commander in chief of the King's Constitutional Guard. On 29 May 1792, the Assembly dissolved this corps, suspecting it of royalist and counter-revolutionary sympathies and accusing the Duke of Brissac of encouraging this and writing a speech ordering his men to go over to the king. He was sent to prison in Orléans to await judgement by the high court before being transferred to Versailles, but the prisoners were separated from their escort and freed by a group of bandits.

He was killed in the 9 September massacres, and his body was mutilated. His head was thrust on a pike and taken on foot by a band of his killers and thrown into a window of Madame du Barry's apartment, at which sight she fainted. With little spirit but much force and courage, he held off his murderers for a long time, receiving several wounds before finally being cut down by a sabre.

Always distinguished for his devotion to Louis XVI, he replied to someone praising him for his conduct: "I only do what I must do for my ancestors and my family". He is mentioned in the fifth verse of Jacques Delille's poem la Pitié, and anecdotes about him are to be found in Paris, Versailles et les provinces.

== Marriage and issue ==
In 1760, he married Adélaïde Diane Mancini (1742–1808), daughter of Louis-Jules Mancini-Mazarini, who was the Duke of Nevers and a grandson of Philippe Jules Mancini (nephew of Cardinal Mazarin). Together, they had two children:

1. Adélaïde (1765–1820), who married in 1782 with Victurnien-Jean-Baptiste de Rochechouart, Duke of Mortemart
2. Jules Gabriel Timoléon (1771–1775), who died during childhood

After the death of Louis Hercule in 1792 without a living male-line descendant, the ducal title passed to Timoléon de Cossé (1775–1848). He was the eldest son of Hyacinthe-Hugues de Cossé, Duke of Cossé (1746–1813), whose father was René-Hugues de Cossé, Count of Cossé (1702–1754). René-Hugues was the third son of Artus de Cossé, 5th Duke of Brissac (1668–1709), the father of the 6th and 7th Dukes of Brissac. After Timoléon de Cossé died in 1848, the ducal title was held by his successive descendants in the male line.

== Sources ==
- Louis Gabriel Michaud. "Louis Hercule Timoléon de Cossé-Brissac". Biographie universelle ancienne et moderne : histoire par ordre alphabétique de la vie publique et privée de tous les hommes avec la collaboration de plus de 300 savants et littérateurs français ou étrangers (in French) (2 ed.).
