= Constitutional Guard =

French royal guard unit in 1792

- Garde Constitutionnelle
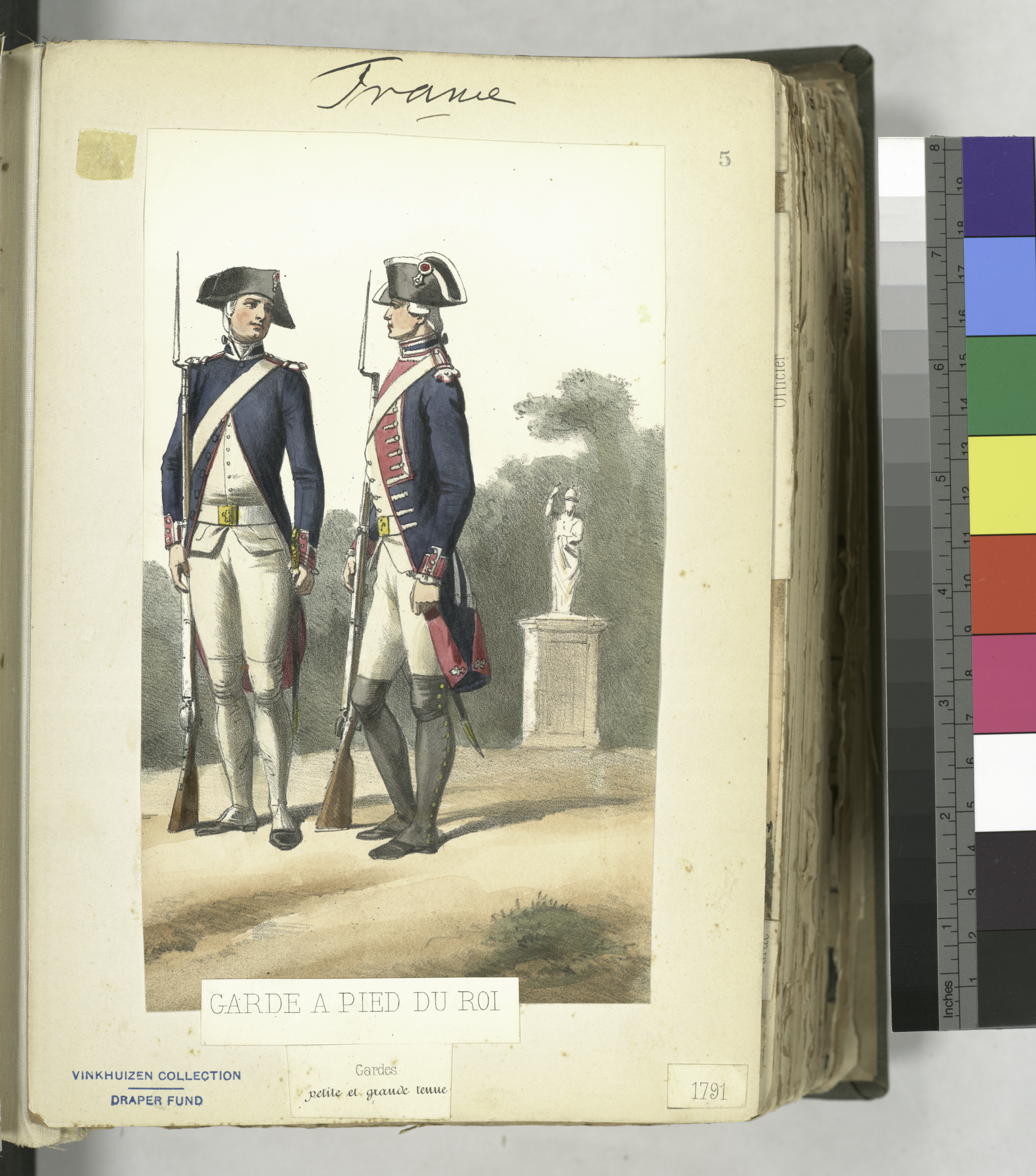
- Uniforms of the Constitutional Guard
- Active: 16 March 1792 – 29 May 1792
- Country: Kingdom of France
- Allegiance: Louis XVI
- Branch: French Royal Army
- Type: Royal guard
- Size: 1,200 infantry and 600 cavalry (2 battalions and 3 cavalry squadrons)

Commanders
- Notable commanders: Louis Hercule Timoléon de Cossé, 8th Duke of Brissac

The Constitutional Guard (French: Garde Constitutionnelle) was a French royal guard formation which lasted a few months in 1792 as part of the Maison du Roi, being superseded by the National Guard. It existed in the period of the constitutional monarchy during the French Revolution.

== History ==
=== Decree ===
When the National Constituent Assembly dissolved itself on 3 September 1791, it decreed as a final measure that King Louis XVI should have a Constitutional Guard, also known as the Garde Brissac after its commander Louis Hercule Timolon de Cossé, Duc de Brissac. This guard's formation was the only court reform to be put into effect, but it only lasted a few months, being superseded by the National Guard.

=== Creation and organisation ===
Formerly created on 16 March 1792 and numbering 1,200 infantry and 600 cavalry, the Constitutional Guard provided a substantial force expected to ensure the security of the constitutional monarchy in the event of any uprising in Paris. It was recruited from a mixture of regular soldiers with good service records and selected volunteers. Members of the former Régiment des Gardes Françaises (which had mutinied immediately before the storming of the Bastille) were specifically excluded from the new corps.

The commanding officer of the Constitutional Guard was the Duc de Brissac, formerly commander of the Cent-Suisses company of Swiss bodyguards and noted for his personal loyalty to the king. The new force was stationed in and near to the Tuileries palace. Queen Marie-Antoinette had asked that it be uniformed in sky-blue but the conservative politician Antoine Barnave was able to persuade her that this apparently minor measure would lead to confusion with the German mercenary regiments of the former Royal Army. The Constitutional Guard was accordingly issued with the dark blue coats of the French National Guard.

The Guard was organised into two infantry battalions, and 3 cavalry squadrons, known simply as the "Mounted" and "Foot" sections.

=== Unpopularity ===
Although the new corps had been organised and sworn in according to the requirements of the Constitution of September 1791, it almost immediately became the object of suspicion and hostility by the growing revolutionary movement. There were street brawls between guardsmen and anti-monarchists, and revolutionary newspapers inaccurately described the Constitutional Guard as being made up of aristocrats. This appears to have been an attempt to link the new guard with its predecessor – the recently disbanded Gardes du Corps, which had been recruited solely from members of the nobility.

=== Dissolution ===
On 29 May 1792 the Constitutional Guard was disbanded. This measure was undertaken following a formal request from the Legislative Assembly addressed to King Louis, whose position had been weakened following the abortive flight to Varennes. He hoped, by concurring in the dissolution of his guard, to win support for several vetoes that he wished to impose. These related to measures aimed at the deportation of refractory priests and the establishment of a military camp for provincial militias near Paris.

The Constitutional Guard was replaced by units of the Paris National Guard, who took over responsibility for the security of the Tuileries palace and the royal family resident there. Lacking any particular commitment of loyalty to the monarchy, the National Guard was to prove unreliable when the Tuileries was finally stormed by revolutionary forces on 10 August 1792. The Duc de Brissac was arrested on charges of planning to use his guardsmen against the Assembly, and subsequently killed during the September Massacres that followed.

== Uniform ==
The standard uniform for the Constitutional Guard was a dark "navy" blue frock coat with red facings, a black bicorne; with white trim, and white breeches and black boots.

== Images ==
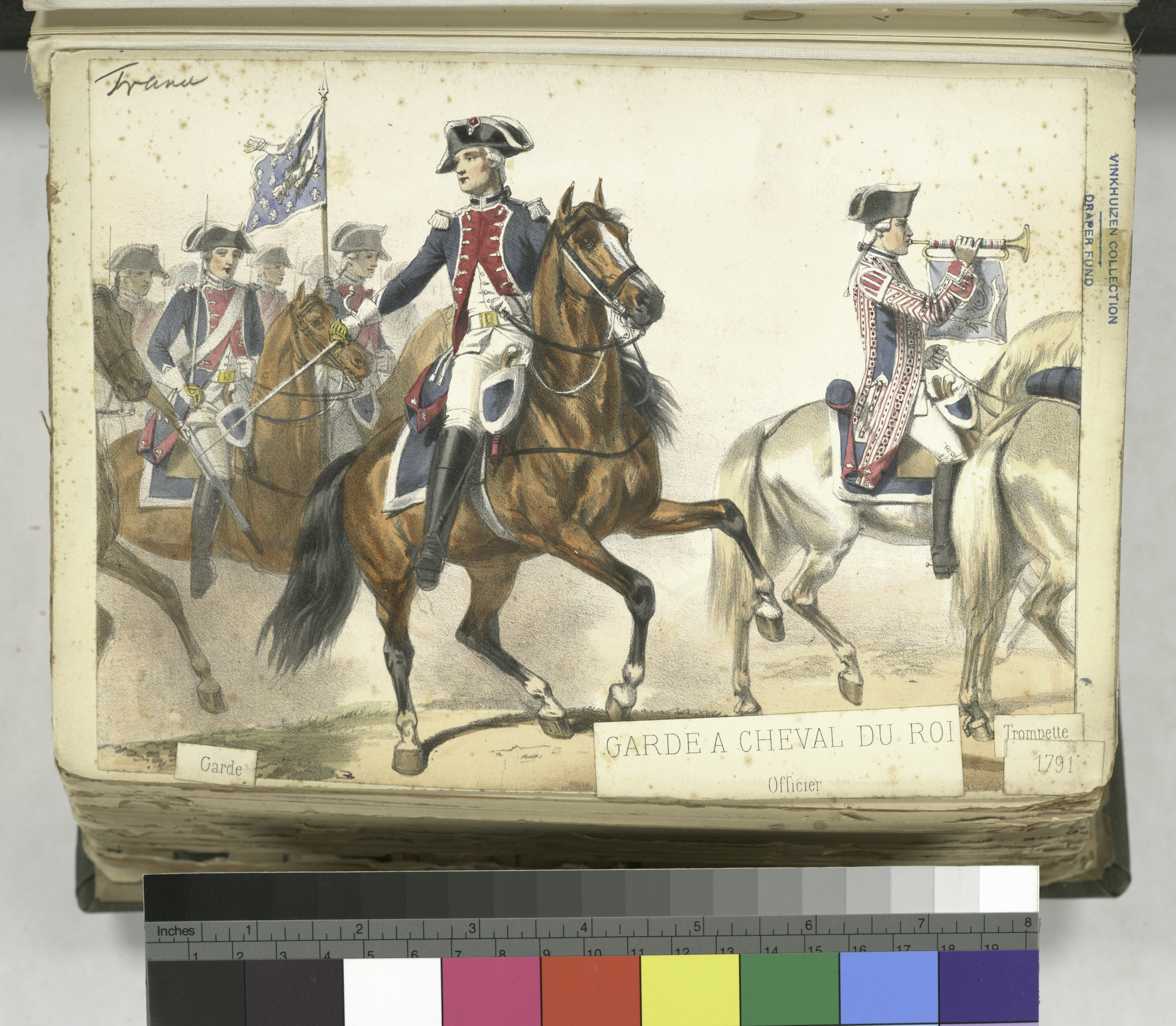
Mounted Section of the Constitutional Guard; Officer, Hornist, NCOs, and Guards

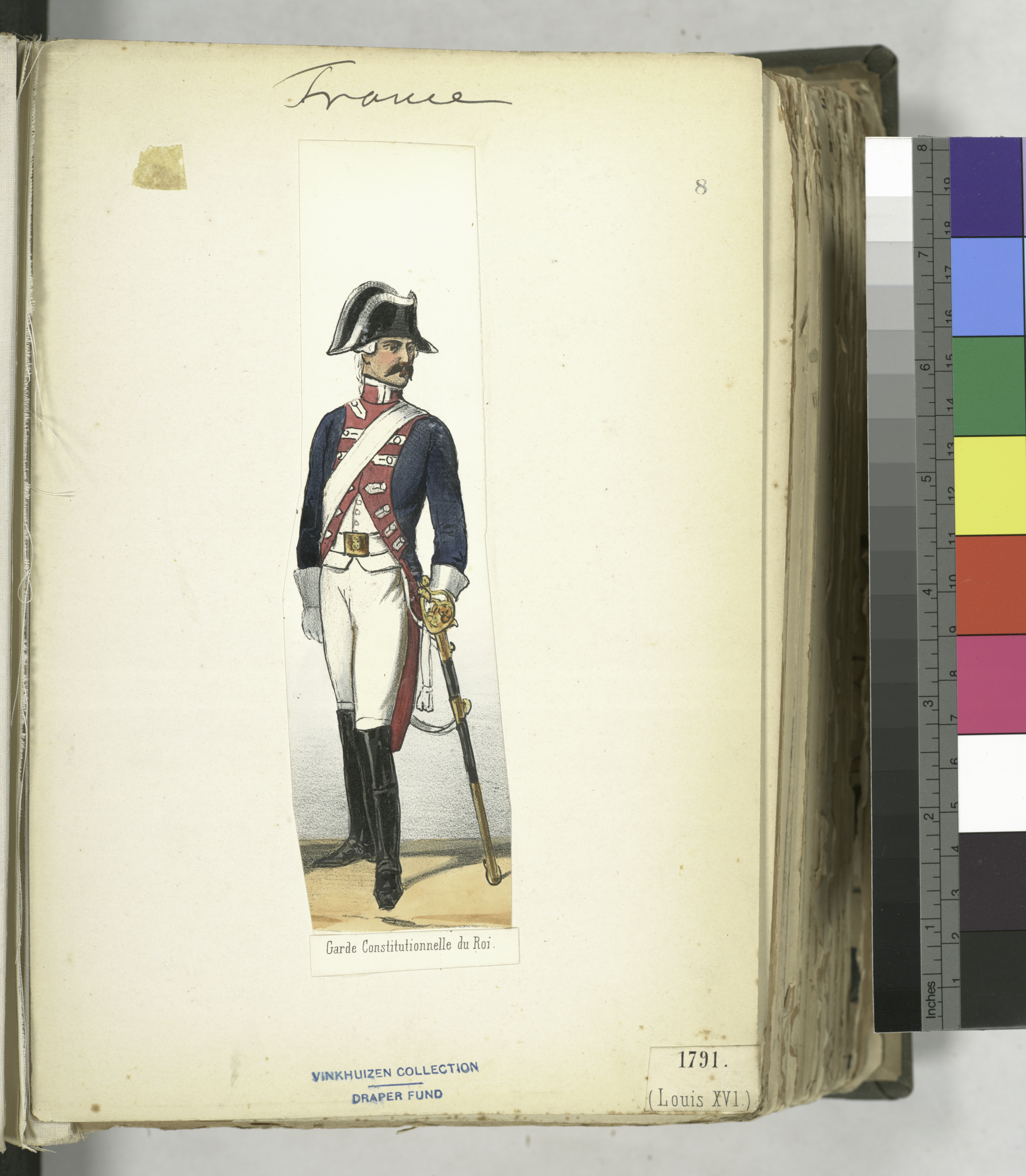
Mounted Trooper of the Constitutional Guards

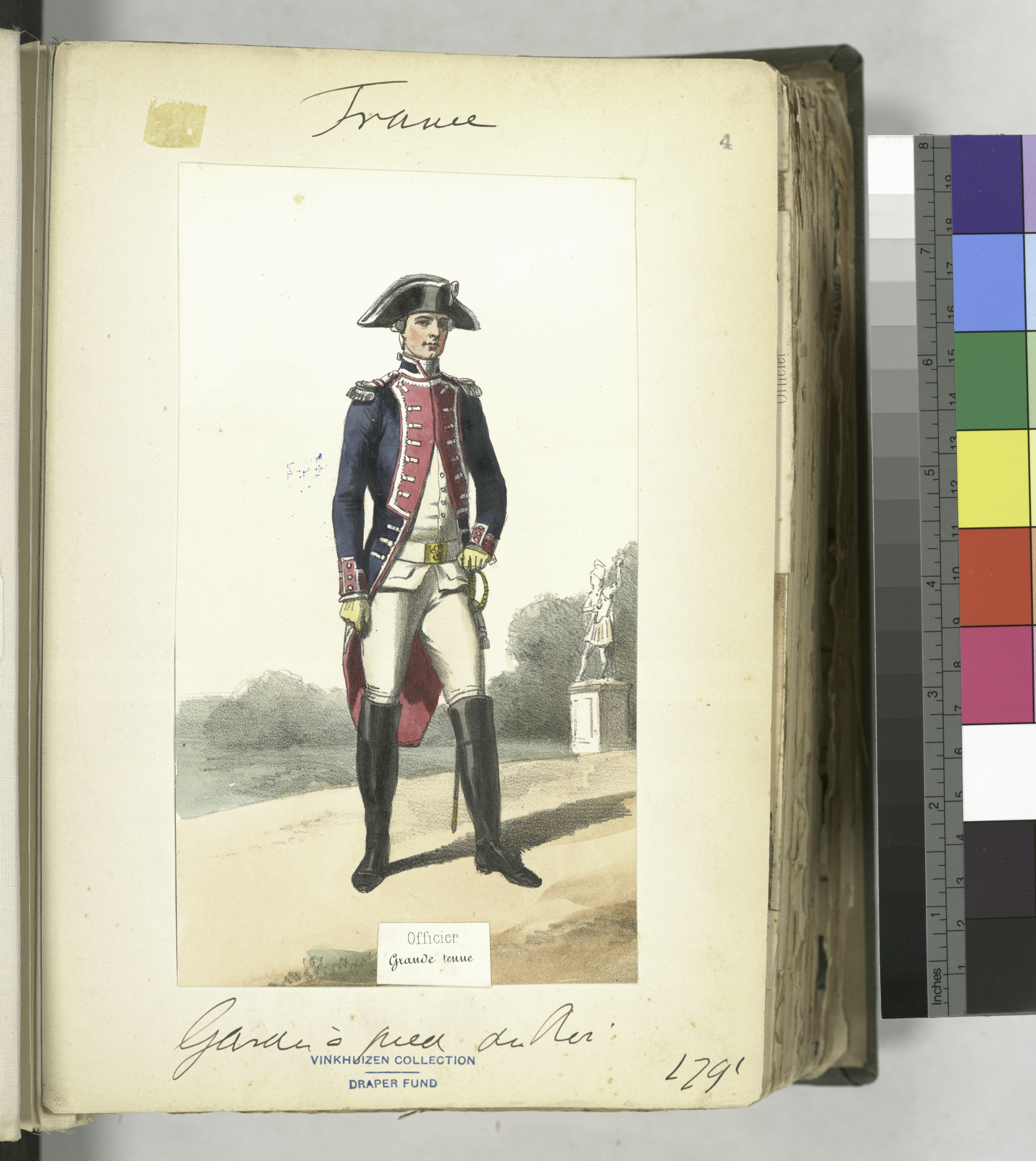
Officer of the Constitutional Guard

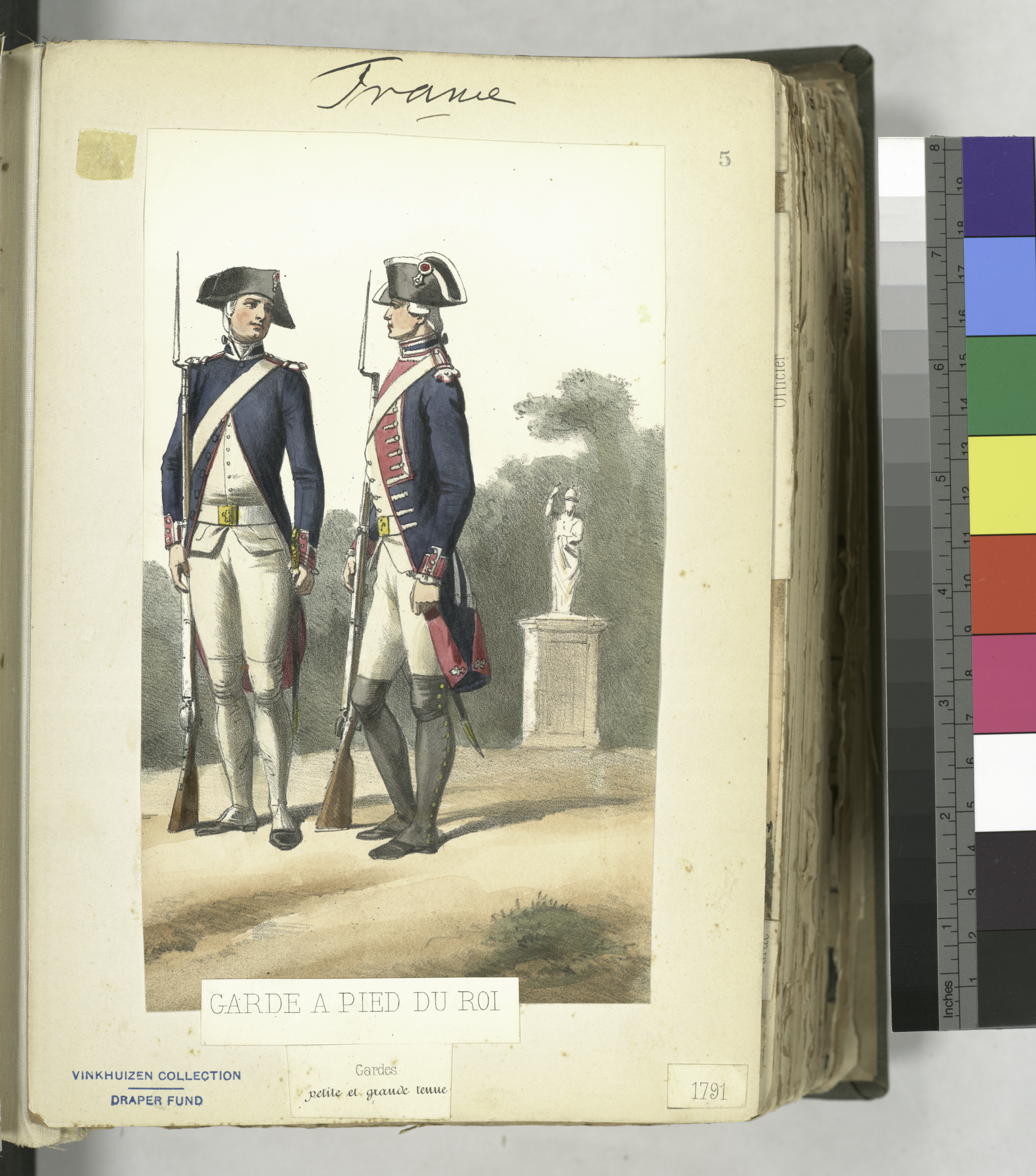
Foot Guards of the Constitutional Guard

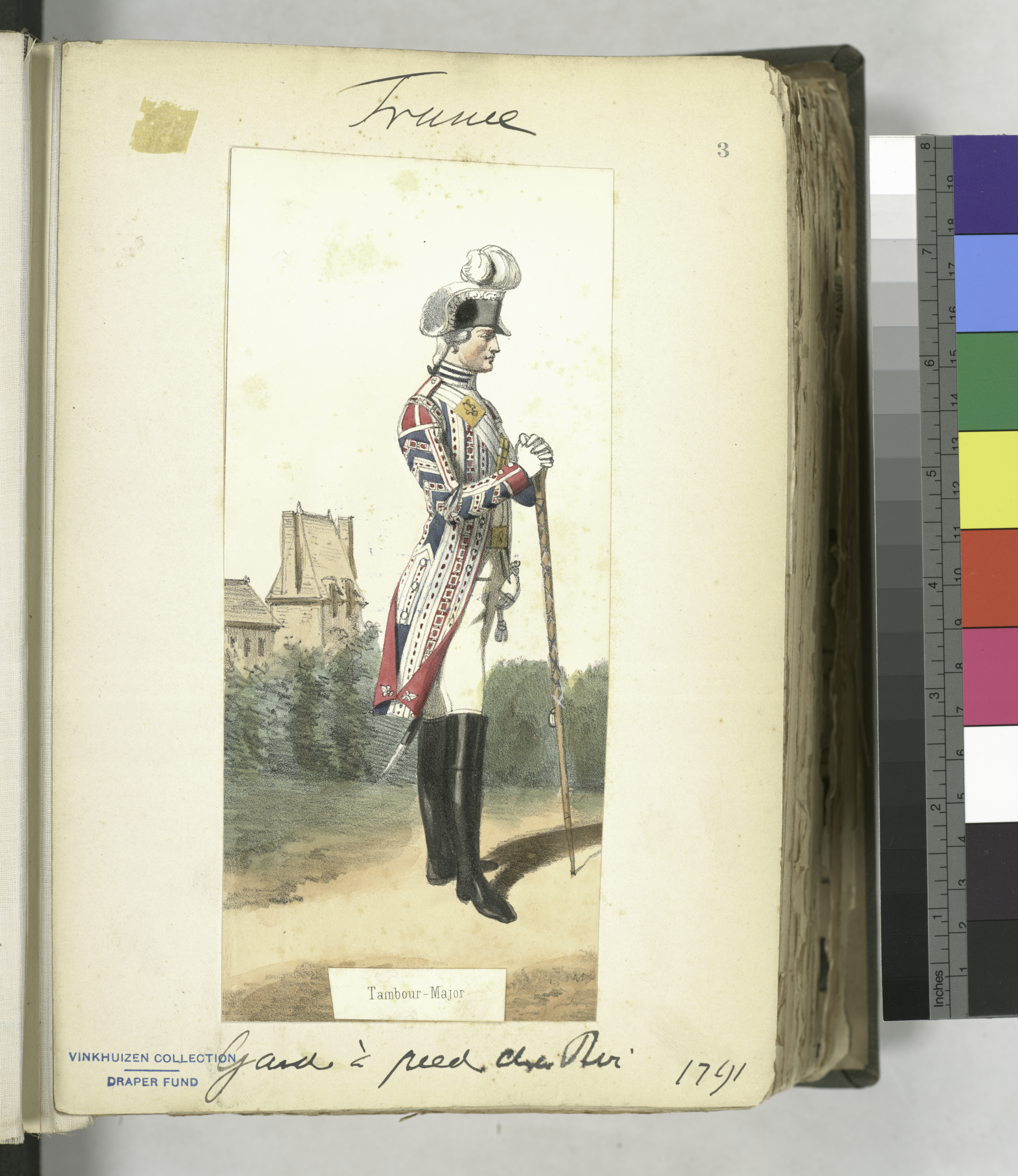
Tambour-Major (Drum Major) of the Constitutional Guard.

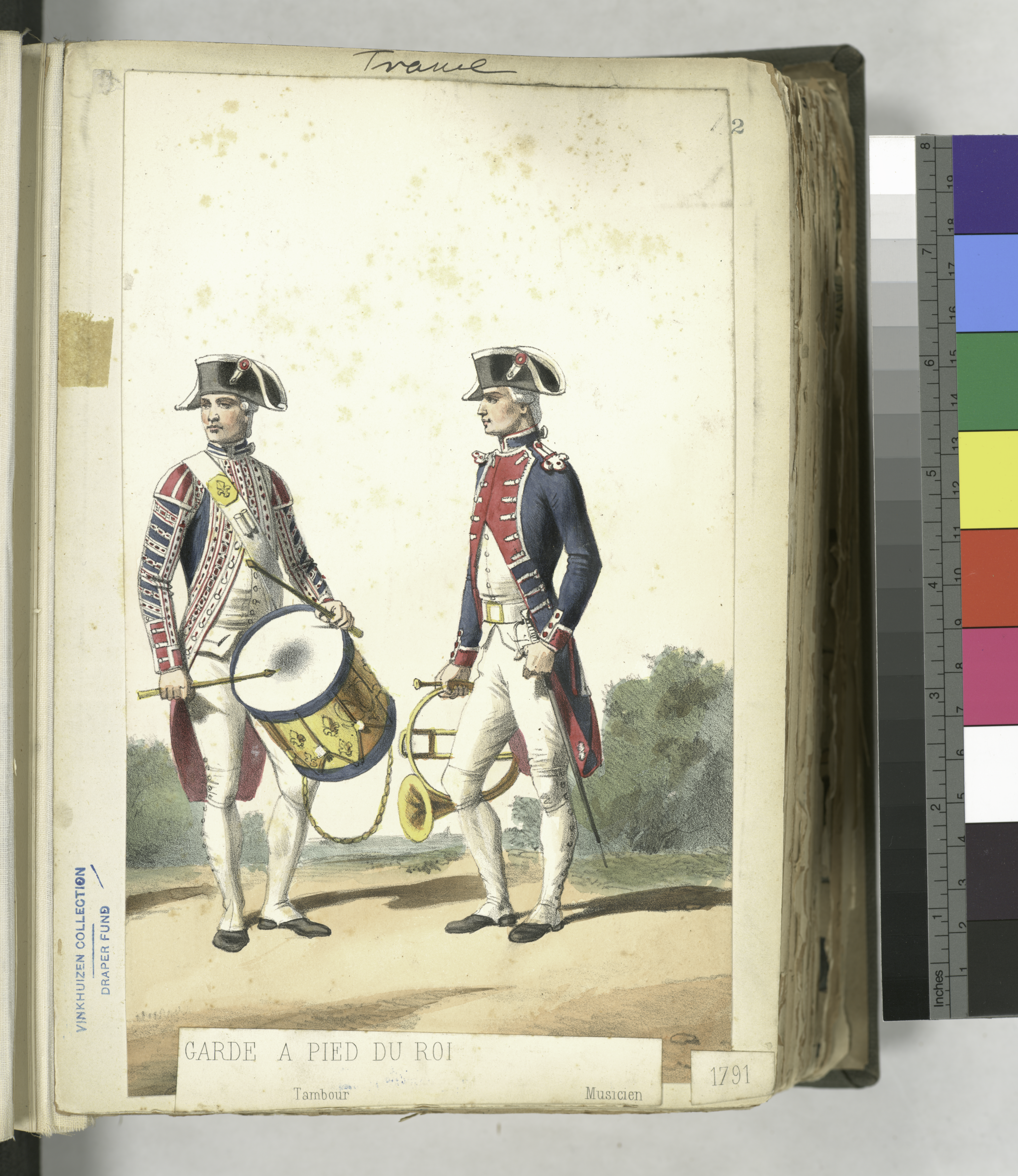
Drummer and Musician of the Grenadiers of the King's Constitutional Guard

== Members of the Guard ==
Royalists

- Louis Hercule Timoléon, Duc de Cossé-Brissac
- Henri de la Rochejaquelein
- Louis François Perrin de Précy
- Louis Charles d'Hervilly
- Charles Marie de Beaumont d'Autichamp

Others

- Joachim Murat
- Jean-Baptiste Bessières
- Henri César Auguste Schwiter

== Bibliography ==
- Jean Tulard, Jean-François Fayard, Alfred Fierro, Histoire et dictionnaire de la Révolution française, Paris, Robert Laffont, 1998.
- François Grouvel, La Garde constitutionnelle du Roi, dite Garde Brissac, Librairie d'histoire : La révolution.
- Mareschal de Bièvre (Comte), La Garde constitutionnelle de Louis XVI (1791–1792), P., Carnet de la Sabretache s. d., paginé de 332 à 502.
- Gérard Jaeger, "La Garde constitutionnelle. Le sabre de la garde à pied de Louis XVI" dans Tradition Magazine, n° 149, octobre 1999.
- Garde constitutionnelle du Roi aux Archives Nationales : O1 664 à 671 (pension) 3696 à 3699 (maison militaire) année 1791 et AF I 1 et 2 : règlements, ordres de service, consignes, personnel, comptabilité... (armoire de fer).
