= Portrait of Louis-Auguste Schwiter =

c. 1827 painting by Eugène Delacroix

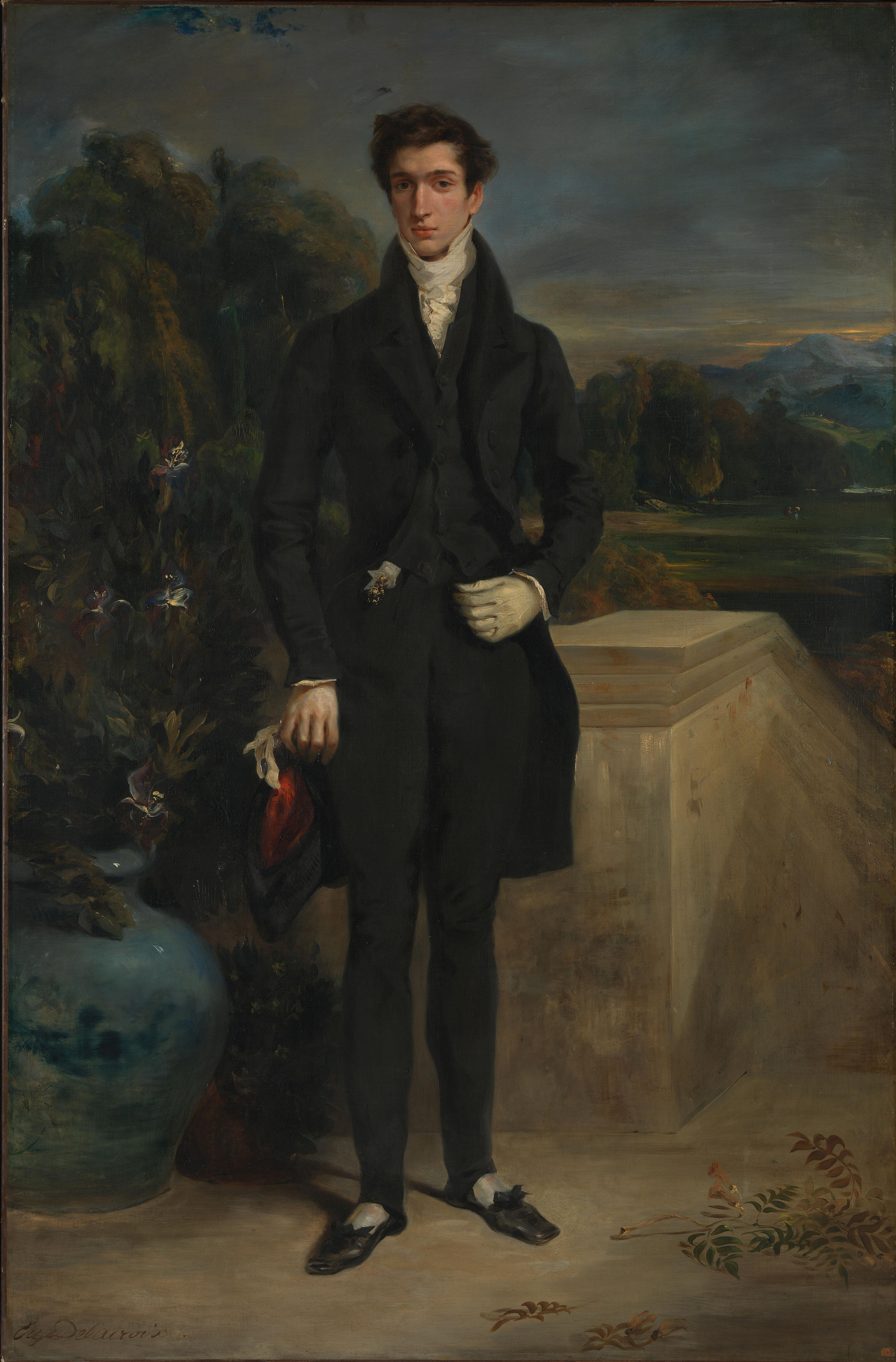
Portrait of Louis-Auguste Schwiter (1826–27) by Eugène Delacroix

Portrait of Louis-Auguste Schwiter is an oil painting on canvas executed in 1826–27 by Eugène Delacroix. The subject, who was the son of Henri César Auguste Schwiter, was a friend of the artist. The painting was an early attempt by Delacroix to combine portraiture with landscape painting.

The portrait was once owned by Edgar Degas and was acquired in 1918 by the National Gallery, London, where it still hangs.
