= Jean Paul Timoléon de Cossé, 7th Duke of Brissac =

Marshal of France (1698–1780)

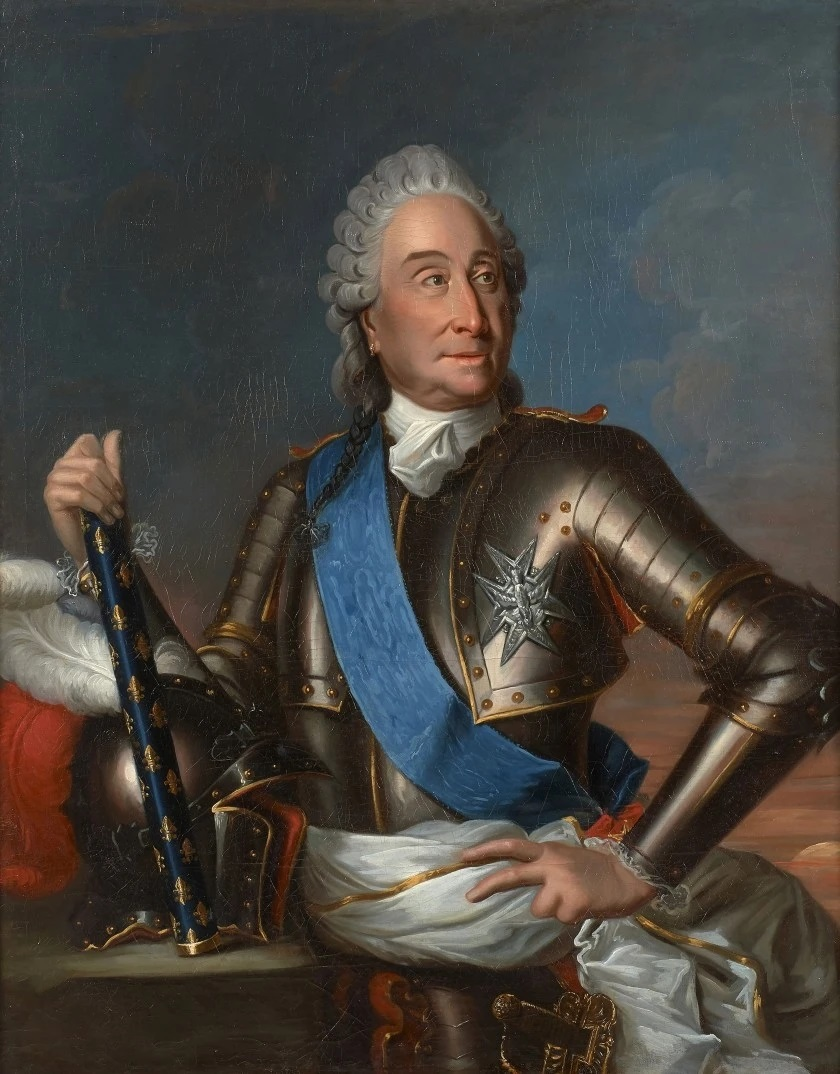
Portrait of the 7th Duke of Brissac

Jean Paul Timoléon de Cossé, 7th Duke of Brissac (12 October 1698, in Paris – 1784, in Sarrelouis), was a French general during the reign of King Louis XV. He is most notable for leading the French vanguard at the Battle of Minden, and he became a Marshal of France. He held the French noble title of Duke of Brissac and was also a Grand Panetier of France.

== Life and career ==
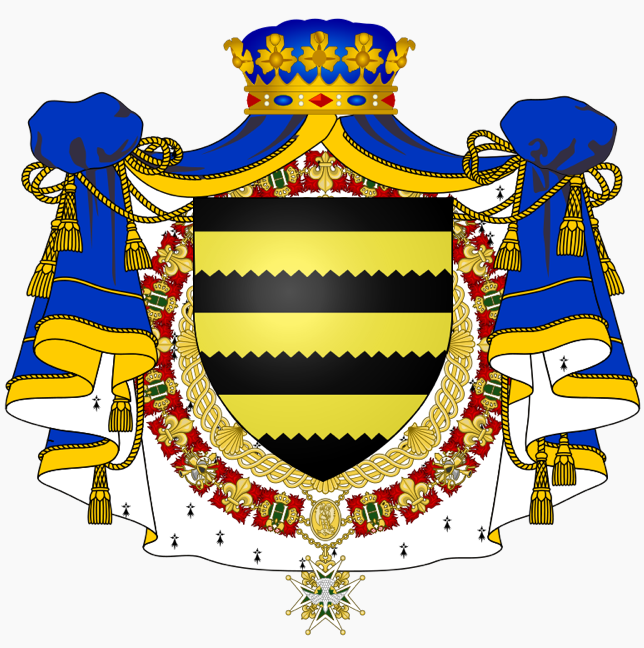
Coat of arms as Duke of Brissac

He was the second son and third of five children of Artus-Timoléon de Cossé (1668-1709), Count then 5th Duke of Brissac, and of Marie Louise Béchameil (daughter of the financier Louis de Béchameil). He began his military career as a knight of the Order of Saint John of Jerusalem, becoming a garde de la marine in 1713. He served from 1714 on the galleys operating out of Malta, fighting in various actions against the Ottoman Empire. In 1716, he fought at the victory during the siege of Corfu under Johann Matthias von der Schulenburg.

He left the navy in 1717 and returned to France. There, he became the mestre de camp of a cavalry regiment named after him, and he served in the War of the Quadruple Alliance, War of the Polish Succession, War of the Austrian Succession and Seven Years' War. He was rewarded for his good conduct during the French defeat at the Battle of Minden in 1759 by being made a Marshal of France.

His courage and politeness were seen as the model of an old-style loyal and frank French knight. He continued wearing Louis XIV-era costume, and for a long time wore a long scarf and a two-queue hairstyle. Charles de Bourbon, Count of Charolais, one day found him at his mistress's house and brusquely told him "Get out, sir", but Brissac replied "Sir, your ancestors would have said 'We get out'".

He inherited the ducal title in 1732 when his elder brother, Charles Timoléon Louis (1693-1732), the 6th Duke of Brissac, died without a male heir.

== Marriage and issue ==
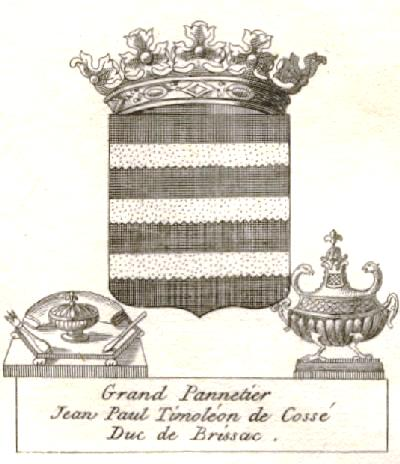
Arms as Grand Panetier of France

In 1732, he married Marie Josèphe Durey (d. 1756), with whom he had three children:

1. Louis Joseph (1733-1759), married Marie-Gabrielle, daughter of Louis-Mathieu Molé, no issue.
2. Louis Hercule (1734-1792), who succeeded as Duke of Brissac, but died in the 9 September massacres without surviving male issue.
3. Pierre Emmanuel Joseph Timoléon (1741-1756), Marquis of Thouarcé, who died unmarried.

After Louis Hercule's death in 1792 without a surviving son, the ducal title passed to Timoléon de Cossé-Brissac (1775-1848). He was the eldest son of Hyacinthe-Hugues de Cossé, Duke of Cossé (1746-1813), whose father was René-Hugues de Cossé, Count of Cossé (1702-1754). René-Hugues was the third son of Artus-Timoléon de Cossé, 5th Duke of Brissac (1668-1709), the father of the 6th and 7th Dukes of Brissac.
