= Royal Guard (France) =

Bourbon military unit (1815–1830)

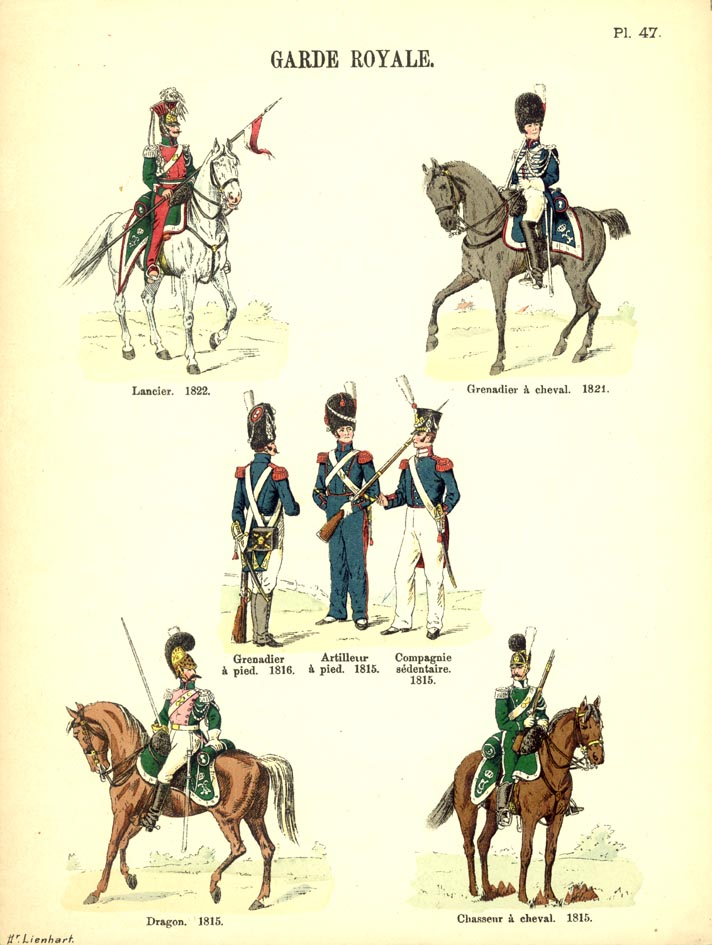
Garde royale, plate 47, volume I, Uniformes de l'armée française by Constant Lienhart and René Humbert.

The Royal Guard (French: garde royale) was a French guard unit set up after the second Bourbon Restoration in 1814. The theoretical role of the unit and of the Maison militaire was to ensure the personal protection of the restored King of France, though it also operated as a combat unit. It served Louis XVIII and Charles X before being abolished by Louis Philippe. It was considered as an elite corps made up of veterans, designed to form part of the royal army's reserve force.

== History ==
=== First restoration ===
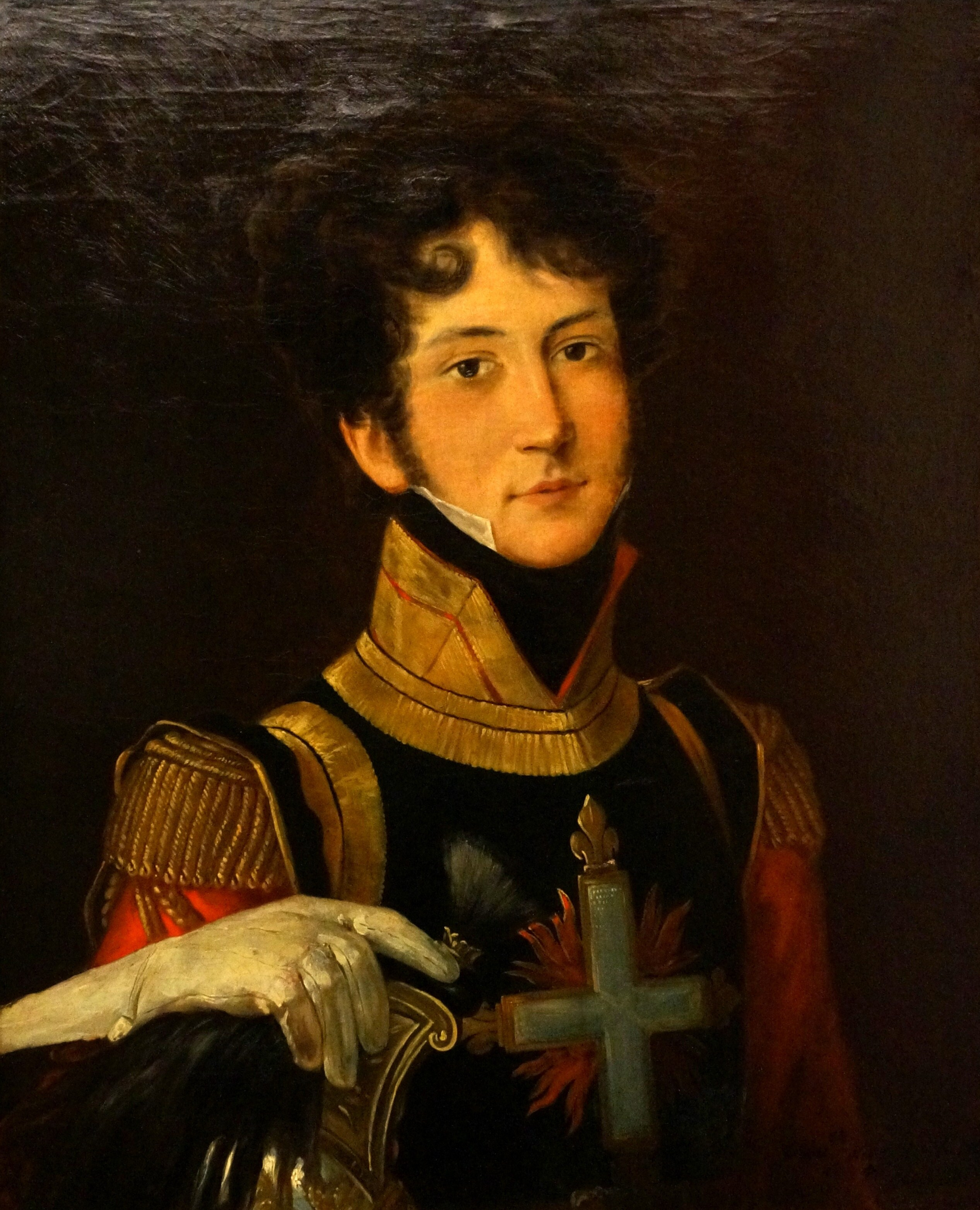
Portrait of a musketeer in the Guard (Musée de l'Armée).

On returning to France in 1814 Louis XVIII intended to restore the reputation of his royal household and created a government ministry to do it, under Pierre de Blacas. With Pierre Denniée as his deputy, de Blacas aimed to re-constitute the king's military household as it had existed under the ancien régime. An ordinance of 25 May 1814 endorsed the creation of several units, several of which had disappeared before the French Revolution.

This military household had 4629 cavalrymen and around 371 infantrymen organised into:

- gardes du corps du roi (5 companies);
- Cent-Suisses (1 company);
- gardes de la porte (1 company);
- gardes de la prévôté (1 company);
- mousquetaires du roi (two companies);
- gendarmes de la garde (1 company);
- chevau-légers de la garde (1 company).

It also included the six regiments of the royal corps, made up of 2758 infantrymen and 2574 cavalrymen.

Louis used his military household to boost his prestige. For example, at the ceremony to translate Louis XVI and Marie-Antoinette's remains on 21 January 1815, the household's musketeers were deployed and came to much public attention for their presence and the beauty of their uniforms.

=== Second Restoration ===
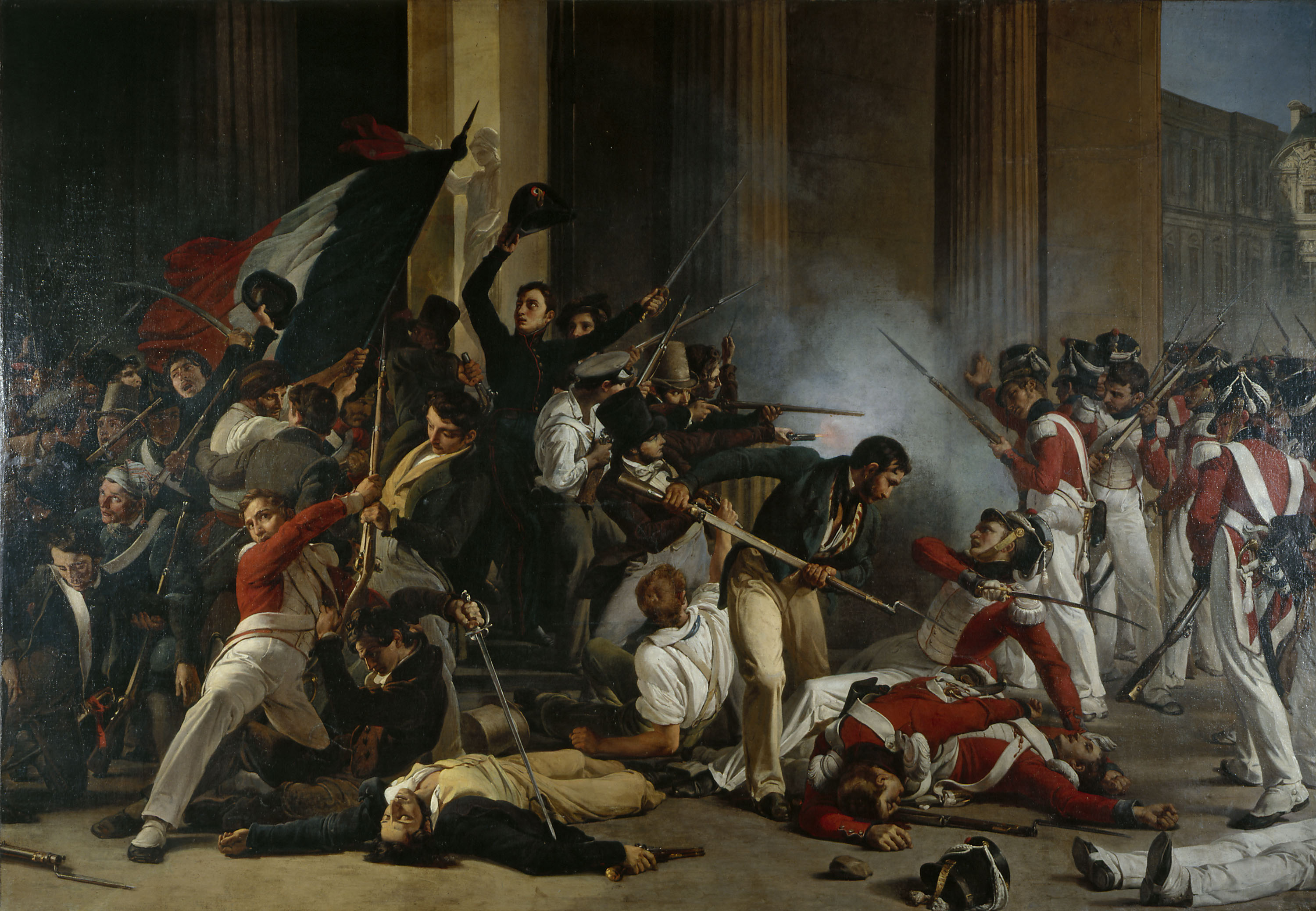
The Swiss troops defending the Louvre during the Trois Glorieuses.

After the Hundred Days the military household was reorganised and reduced. An ordinance on 1 September 1815 dissolved several of its units, including the gardes de la porte, the musketeers, the gendarmes and the light cavalry. The gardes de la prévôté were demobbed on 1 May 1817.

In parallel, Louis decided to create a royal guard from the six regiments of the royal corps, in theory to combine with the military household as his personal protection but in reality soon becoming a combat unit like Napoleon's Imperial Guard. Its strength was fixed at 25,000 men, consisting of eight infantry regiments (including two Swiss ones) with three battalions each, eight cavalry regiments with six squadrons each and eight artillery batteries with 48 guns each.

In theory the guard's commander was the king himself as its colonel général, with four marshals under him, each entitled a major général - the duc de Reggio, the duc de Bellune, the duc de Tarente and the duc de Raguse. The guard was an army in miniature and took part in the 1823 Spanish expedition, most notably the capture of Fort Louis at the entrance to the Trocadéro canal. Seven years later the sections of the Guard stationed in Paris fought to defend the Bourbon monarchy during the July Revolution, before being abolished on 11 August 1830.

== Formation and recruitment ==
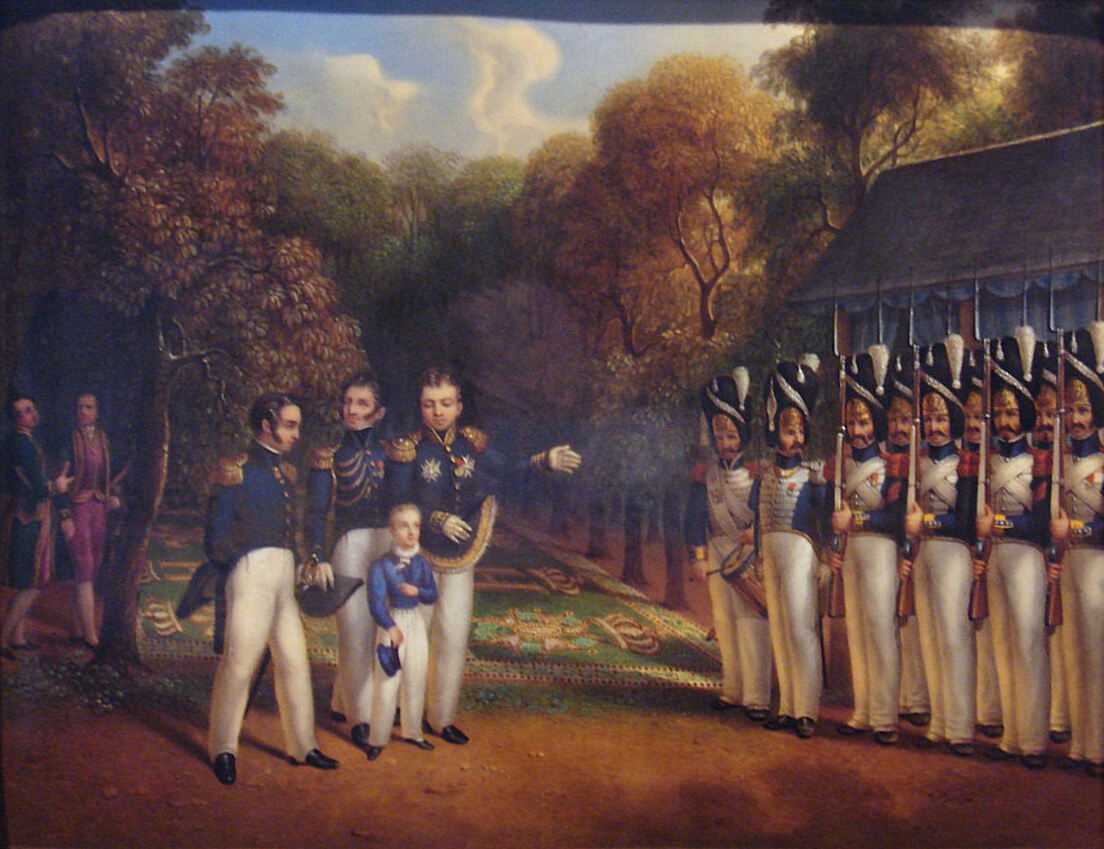
The young duc de Bordeaux inspecting the guard grenadiers.

Being admitted to the Guard was considered one of the highest rewards in the French army. Louis had no confidence in the rest of the army and mainly relied on recruiting former émigrés, especially for the Guard and military household, both of whose officers were personally chosen by the king.

Its uniform was more elaborate than line infantry and cavalry, they were better paid, and given higher rank and greater privileges - a Guard private was equivalent to a line corporal, a Guard corporal to a line sergeant, and so on up to the highest ranks. That rank arrangement was abolished in 1826 but after four years in their rank commissioned Guard officers were still given a higher rank and when they later gained a role at this other rank they took the rank they had held on the day those four years ran out.

== Composition ==
=== Maison du roi (6 companies) ===
- 1st company of gardes du corps du roi, commanded by the duc d'Havré.
- 2nd company of gardes du corps du roi, commanded by the comte des Escotais.
- 3rd company of gardes du corps du roi, commanded by the duc de Gramont.
- 4th company of gardes du corps du roi, commanded by the vicomte Paultre de Lamotte.
- 5th company of gardes du corps du roi, commanded by the duc de Rivière.
- Cent-Suisses Company, commanded by the duc de Mortemart.

=== Infantry (8 regiments) ===
- 1st to 6th regiments of guard infantry
- 7th and 8th Swiss regiments of guard infantry

=== Cavalry (8 regiments) ===
- 1st and 2nd guard grenadier regiments
- 1st and 2nd guard cuirassier regiments
- Regiment of guard dragoons
- Regiment of guard chasseurs
- Regiment of guard hussars
- Regiment of guard lancers

=== Artillery (1 regiment) ===
- Régiment d'artillerie de la Garde royale, demobbed 11 August 1830.
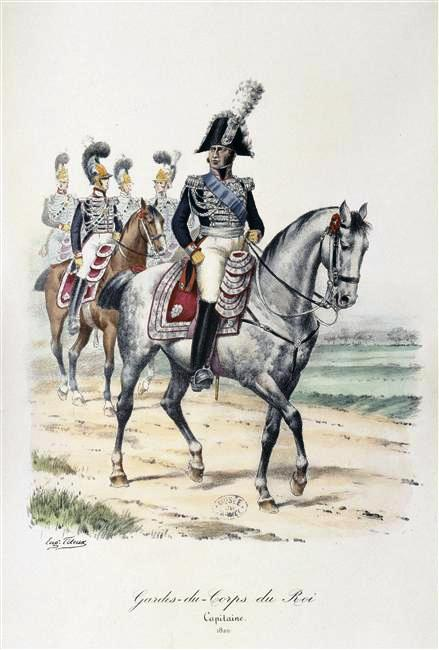
Captain in the gardes du corps du roi.

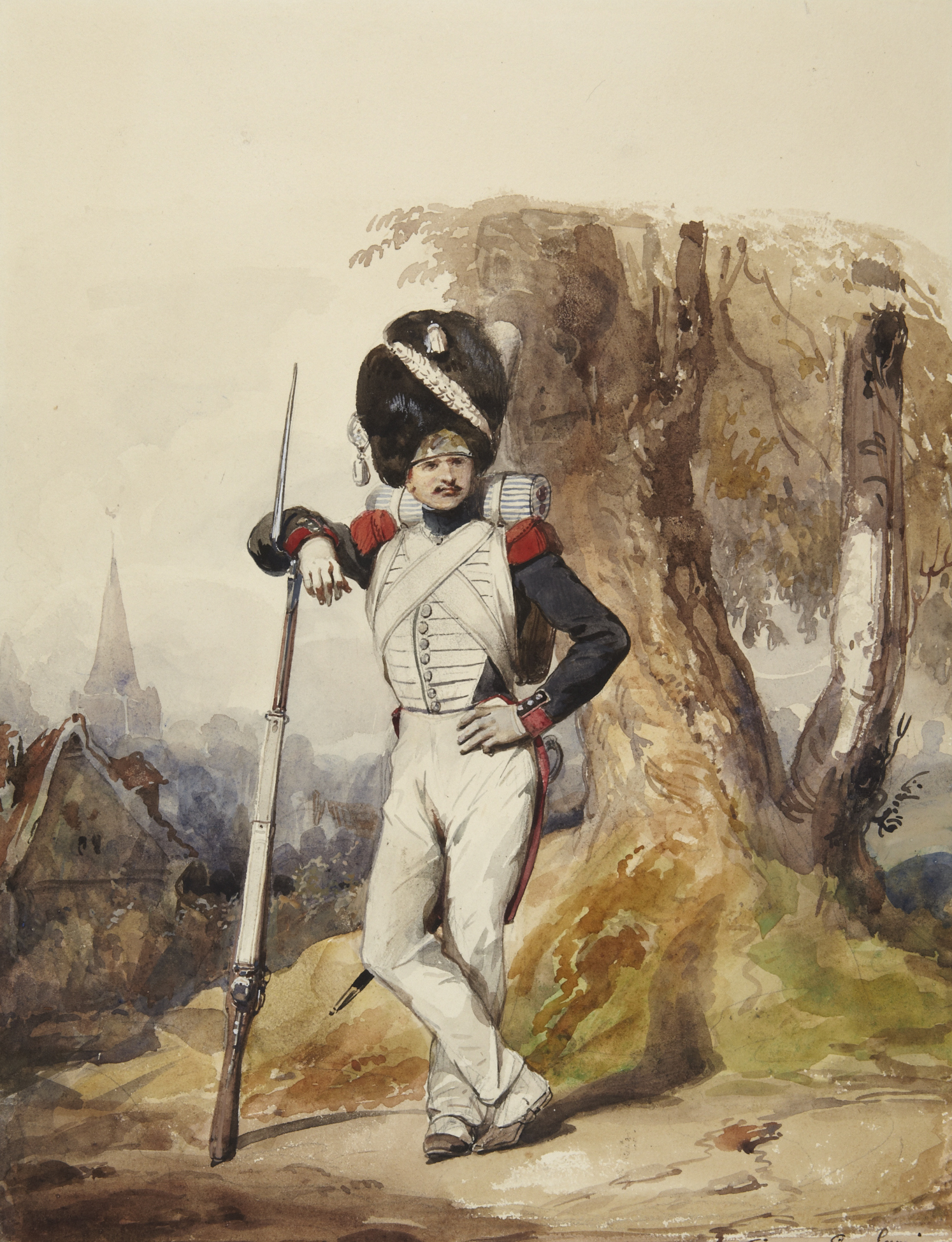
Guard grenadier (Eugène Lami).

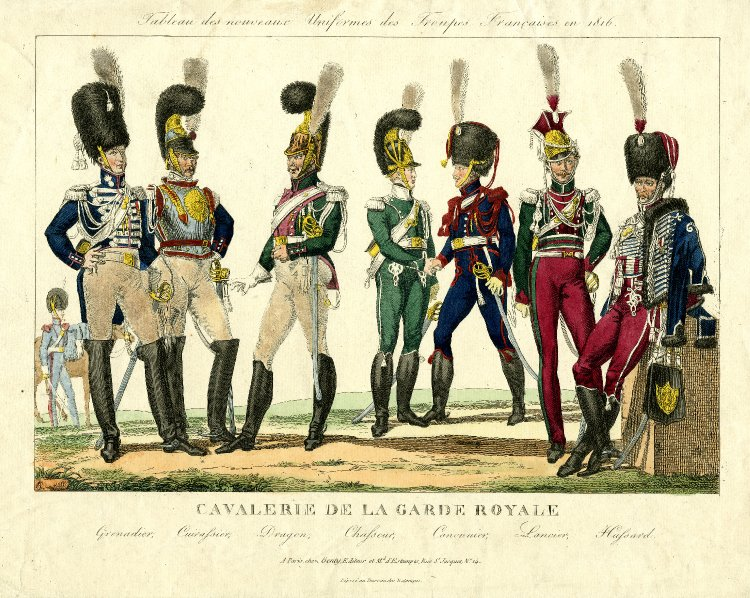
Guard cavalrymen.

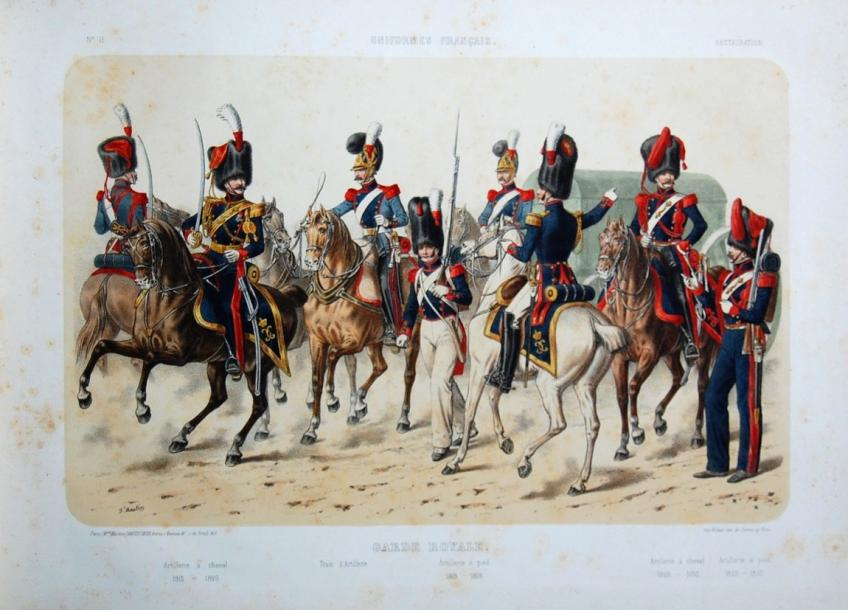
Guard artillerymen
