= Maison militaire du roi de France =

Military branch of the French royal household

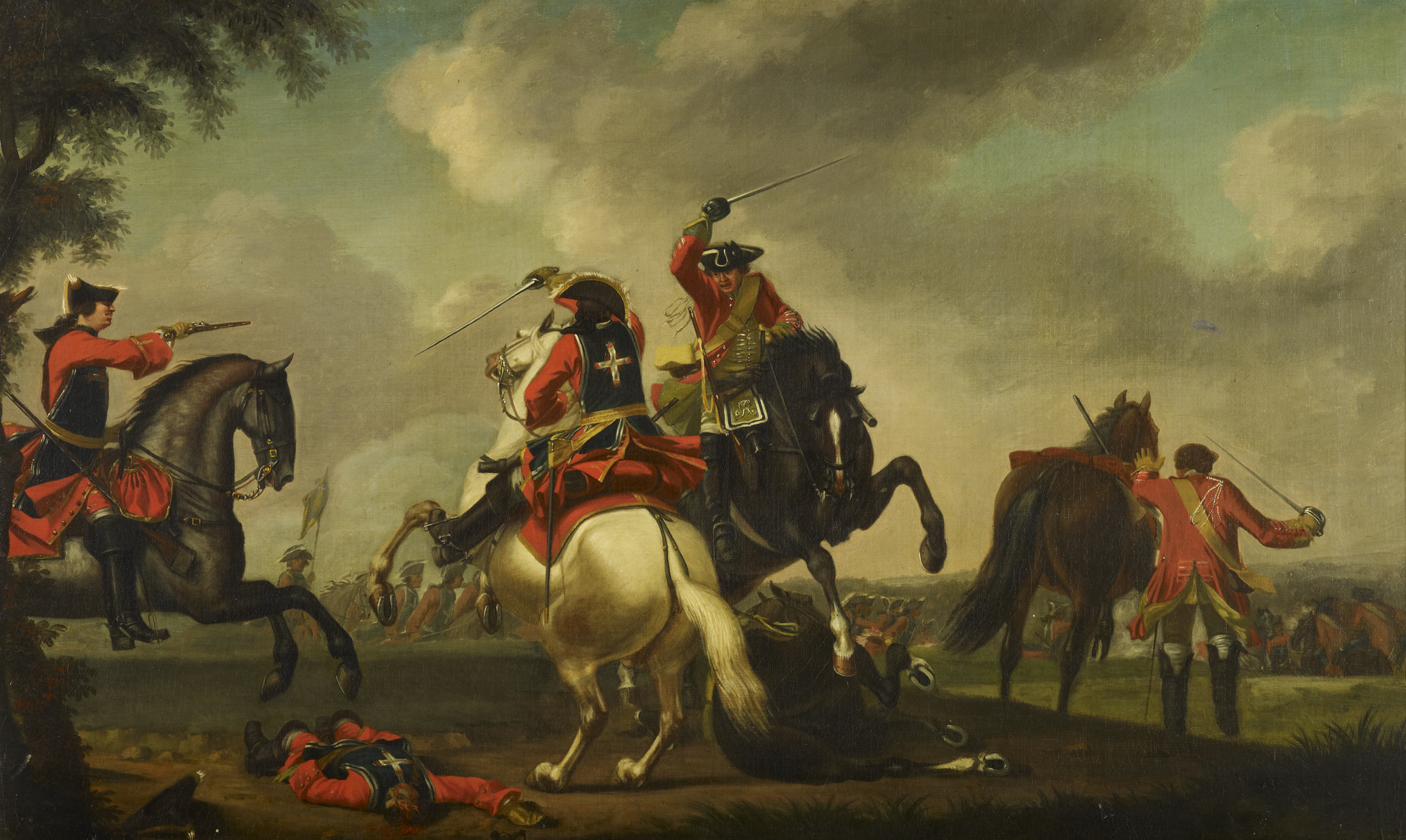
Cavalry of the maison militaire du roi de France skirmishing with British Army cavalry during the Seven Years' War

The maison militaire du roi de France (French pronunciation: [mɛzɔ̃ militɛʁ dy ʁwa də fʁɑ̃s], military household of the king of France) were the military branch of the Maison du Roi, the royal household of the French monarchy. Officially part of the French Royal Army, like the rest of the Maison du Roi the maison militaire was under the authority of the Secretary of State of the Maison du Roi. However, the formation depended on the ordinaire des guerres, controlled by the Secretary of State for War, for their budget. Under Louis XIV, these two officers of state were given joint command of the maison militaire.

== Composition ==
The household was akin to the British Household Division in that it comprised a number of both cavalry and infantry units, serving as the sovereign's personal guard as well as elite troops during war. Recruitment to some of its units was limited to gentlemen, like the gardes du corps and Mousquetaires de la Garde. The rank and file of other regiments, such as the French Guards, comprised commoners. However, commoners couldn't rise to officer rank in units of the military household. On the field of battle, the "Maison du Roi" fought around the king and the "porte-cornette blanche" (the king's white standard), although the corps also fought in the king's absence. Until the 17th century's second half, the "Maison du Roi" had — along with the "Cavalerie d'ordonnance", the six "Vieux" and the six "Petits-Vieux" — made up the permanent army of the Kingdom of France.

=== Corps ===
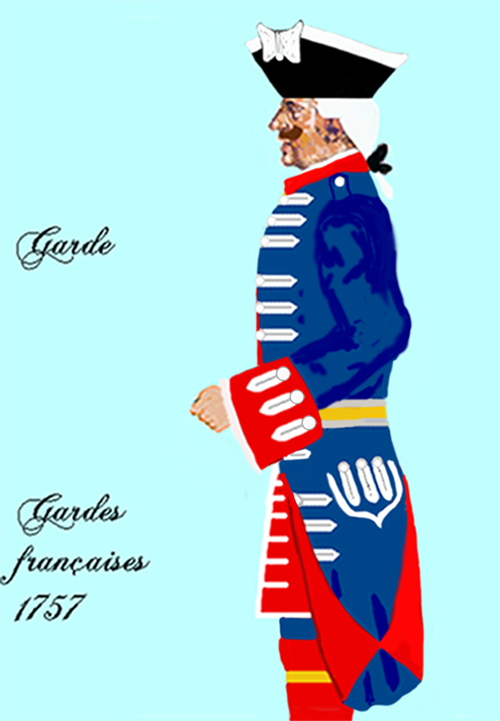
French Guards circa 1750

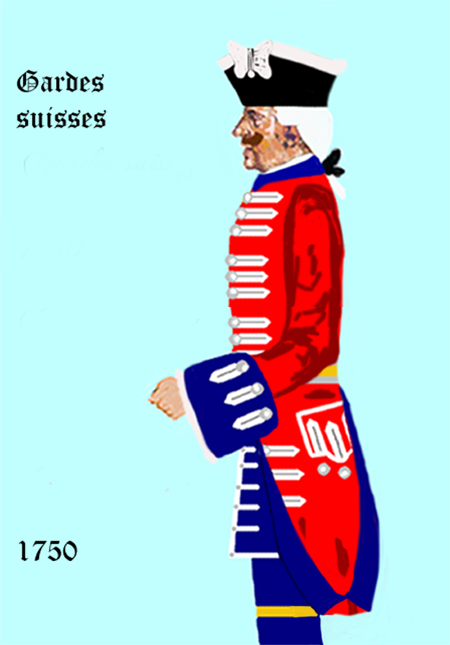
Swiss Guards circa 1750

Over the years, the Maison du Roi included the following corps:

- the Gardes du Corps (body guards)
- the Cent-Suisses
- the Gentilshommes à bec de corbin
- the Gardes Françaises (regiment created in 1563)
- the Chevau-légers (light cavalry) (1593)
- the Gendarmes de la garde (1609–1611)
- the Gardes suisses (1616)
- the Mousquetaires de la Garde (two companies, 1622 and 1660)
- the Gendarmerie d'ordonnance (1660, suppressed in 1788)
- the Grenadiers à cheval (1676)
- the Gardes de la porte, sometimes known as Gardes de la porte du roi

== History ==
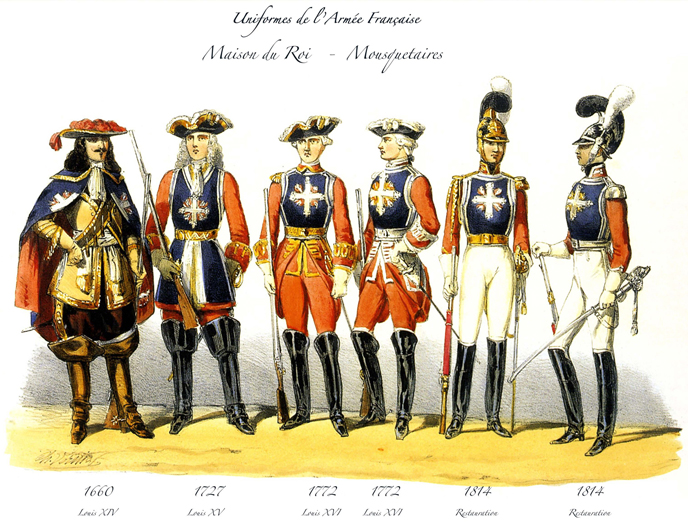
Uniforms of the Musketeers of the Guard from 1660 to 1814

Far from being simply a ceremonial corps, the "Maison du Roi" participated in all the major military campaigns of the 16th and 17th centuries.

=== Under Francis I ===
The oldest of the regiments of the Maison du Roi was the Garde Écossaise, formed in 1440, and traced its ultimate origins to the Scots forces brought to France in 1419 by John Stewart, Earl of Buchan to fight against the English in the Hundred Years' War.

Buchan's original company was divided in two, one part becoming the 1st (or Scottish) Company of the Life Guards (Gardes du Corps), the other becoming the senior company of Gendarmes. A second and third, both French, companies of Life Guards were formed by Louis XI in 1474 and 1479 respectively. Finally, the fourth company, again French, was raised by Francis I in 1516. These companies existed until the French Revolution when they were disbanded.

In 1567, during the Surprise of Meaux, the royal family escaped capture by Prince de Condé's Protestant troops through the intervention of the Cent-Suisses.

=== Francis I to Louis XIII ===
During the final period of the French Wars of Religion, Henry IV wished to provide guards for christening of the Dauphin Louis (the future Louis XIII). Therefore, he created a new company of 200 men-at-arms, which formed half of the Dauphin's guards. In 1611, this company became the Gendarmes de la Garde. This company was paired with another company of heavy cavalry. These chevau-légers (light cavalry) were only light compared to the Gendarmes, who wore more armour. This company dated to 1570 and became part of the Dauphin's guard and then of the Maison du Roi.

The next companies of the Maison du Roi, and by far the most famous, were the Musketeers, the guardsmen who appear in Dumas senior's The Three Musketeers. The first company, formed in 1622, represents the Musketeers in which D'Artagnan and his friends served. The second company, not taken into the Maison du Roi until 1663, was previously the Cardinal Mazarin's guards. Perhaps, this way, some of Cardinal Richelieu's guards eventually became King's Musketeers, which by now became a two-company battalion in all but name.

=== Louis XIV and apogee ===
Unlike the previous companies, officered by powerful nobles and with many nobles in their ranks, the final company of the Maison du Roi was created as an elite force, formed by taking one grenadier from each infantry regiment and making him a mounted grenadier. The resulting picked men who would become the Grenadiers à cheval were interviewed by Louis XIV. Those colonels who in the Sun King's opinion had not sent the best of their men were reprimanded and ordered to send more suitable replacements. The company was completed in 1676. The military household played a vital role in the Battle of Oudenarde of 1708, saving the French army from probable destruction.

=== 18th century and decline ===
The regiments of the Maison du Roi did not see significant active service after the Seven Years' War of 1756–1763. For economic reasons, several of these expensive units were disbanded during a financial crisis in 1787. These included the gardes de la prevote, the gardes de la porte, the gendarmes de la Garde, and the chevau-legers de la Garde. The Mousquetaires de la Garde had already been dissolved on 1 January 1776. The Garde du Corps (Body Guard), the Gardes françaises and the Gardes suisses remained in service. The first was retained because of its close ties to the Royal Court, the French and Swiss Guards because they comprised the largest, and historically most effective, infantry components of the Maison du Roi.

At the French Revolution's outbreak in July 1789, the French Guards defected from the monarchy and joined in the attack on the Bastille. The Body Guard was formally disbanded in 1791, although this aristocratic body had already dispersed when the royal family had been forced to leave Versailles in October 1789. This left the Swiss Guard as the last remaining unit of the old Maison du Roi, although a short-lived Garde Constitutionelle du Roi was raised on 16 March 1792.

On 10 August 1792, most of the 900 Swiss Guards defending the Tuileries were massacred when revolutionary forces stormed the palace. With the overthrow of the monarchy, the Maison militaire du Roi ceased to exist.

=== Restoration ===
Following the First Restoration of 1814, the Bourbon monarchy attempted to recreate the Maison militaire du Roi, even re-establishing the mostly-ceremonial units that Louis XVI had disbanded in 1787. In part, this was to provide military roles for émigré royalist officers who had returned to France or their sons. However, there was not sufficient time to raise a new Swiss Guard before Napoleon's return from Elba in March 1815, although the future Charles X acknowledged that the regiment's past services warranted this being done. The Maison militaire disintegrated during the flight of Louis XVIII to Belgium and only 450 men remained with him to cross the frontier. After the Second Restoration, no serious attempt was made to again restore the Maison militaire du Roi and it was (with the exception of a re-organised Body Guard and a small ceremonial Swiss unit) replaced with an entirely new Royal Guard of division size, which lasted till 1830.

The 1816–30 Royal Guard consisted of:

- twelve infantry regiments of which two were Swiss and the remainder French
- one Cent-Suisses company carried over from the Military Household of 1814
- eight cavalry regiments
- one Garde du Corps de Monsieur squadron;
- two artillery regiments (foot and mounted) made up of 8 batteries split into two battalions, artillery being absent from the original Maison militaire during its existence.

== Bibliography ==
- (in French) Barbiche, Bernard, Les Institutions de la monarchie française à l'époque moderne, Paris, PUF, 1999.
- (in French) Chagniot, Jean, "Maison militaire du roi", Dictionnaire de l'Ancien Régime, Lucien Bély dir., Paris, PUF, 1996.
- (in French) Drévillon, Hervé, L'Impôt du sang, Paris, Tallandier, 2005.
