= Henri César Auguste Schwiter =

French officer

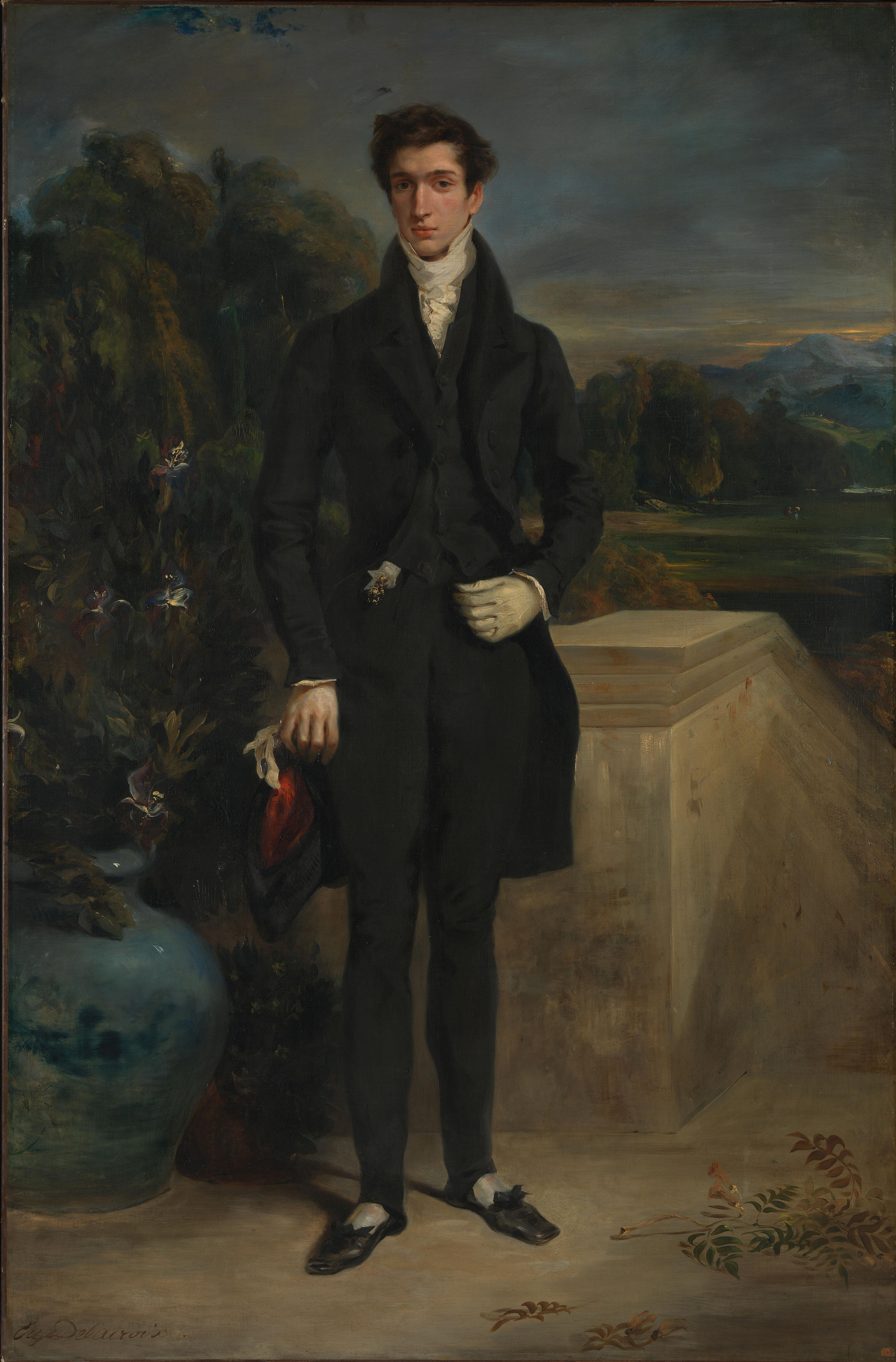
- Portrait of Louis-Auguste Schwiter by Delacroix (1826-1830) – he was the general's son.
- Born: 8 January 1768; Rueil-Malmaison, Île-de-France
- Died: 11 August 1839 (aged 71); Nancy, Meurthe
- Military career
- Allegiance: Kingdom of France; French First Republic; French Empire
- Branch: (Kingdom of France) Royal French Army (France) French Revolutionary Army (France) French Imperial Army
- Service years: 1772–1815
- Rank: Général de Division
- Conflicts: French Revolutionary Wars; Napoleonic Wars; Battle of Albuera; Battle of Vittoria
- Awards: Legion of Honour; Order of Saint Louis

Henri César Auguste Schwiter (8 January 1768 – 11 August 1839) was a French general in the Revolutionary and Napoleonic Wars. He was also notable as a patron of the painter Eugène Delacroix.

== Life ==
Born at Rueil-Malmaison, he joined the Régiment des Gardes Suisses as a child on 31 July 1772. He rose to corporal on 31 December 1785 and transferred to the Constitutional Guard on 15 January 1792. On 6 September the same year he volunteered for a company of 'les Quatres-Nations', in which he was promoted to corporal five days later. On 23 September he became a sergeant in the Pont-neuf Battalion (later known as the 19th Paris Volunteer Battalion), rising to sergeant-major on 9 November, sub-lieutenant on 18 November and captain adjutant-major on 3 April 1793. He was attached to the 88th Infantry Demi-Brigade on 21 March 1794 as part of the armée de la Moselle, with which he was wounded on 30 December 1795 at the siege of Mannheim.

On 21 January 1796 he transferred to the 103rd Line Infantry Demi-Brigade and was captured by the Austrians in June 1796. He was freed on 19 July 1797 and rejoined his regiment, serving with the armies of the Rhine, Helvetia and the Danube between 1797 and 1801. He rejoined the army of Hanover in 1803 and was made a knight of the Légion d’honneur on 5 November 1804. He was put in command of a battalion of the 57th Line Infantry Regiment and took part in the Austrian, Prussian and Polish campaigns between 1805 and 1807. He was made colonel of the 55th Line Infantry Regiment on 22 June 1807 and baron of the empire on 10 September 1808.

He was sent to the Peninsula in 1808, where was wounded again on 16 May 1811 at the Battle of Albuera. He was made an officer of the Légion d’honneur on 11 July 1811 and promoted to brigadier-general on 4 September 1812 and took command of the 2nd Brigade of the 4th Division of the French forces operating in southern Spain on 16 July 1813. His left leg was seriously wounded in the siege of Pamplona and had to be amputated, after which he was allowed to return to France on 6 October 1813. The restored Louis XVIII made him a knight of the Order of Saint-Louis on 1 November 1814, but during the Hundred Days Napoleon put him in charge of organising the regiments of the 1st Military Division on 24 April 1815 and command of Le Havre on 11 May. This division was based in Paris and encompassed the departments of Seine, Aisne, Eure-et-Loir, Oise, Seine-et-Marne, and Seine-et-Oise. He was retired from the army after Napoleon's final fall. He died at Nancy.
