= Grand Panetier of France =

Officer of state in the French royal court

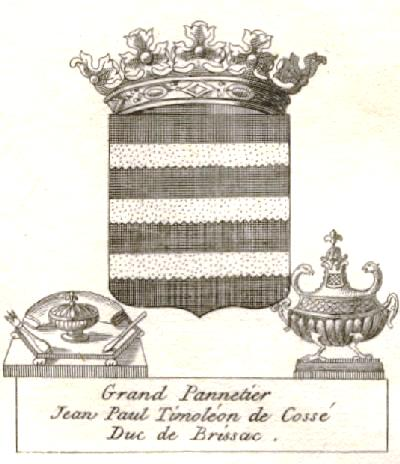
Arms of the 7th Duke of Brissac as Grand Panetier of France

The Grand Panetier of France (roughly "Great Breadmaster", sometimes rendered as Panter) was one of the Great Officers of the Crown of France, a member of the Maison du Roi ("King's Household"), one of the Great Offices of the Maison du Roi, and functional chief of the "(grande) paneterie" (the root of the English word pantry) or bread department.

== French history ==
Originally the paneterie (known since the 11th century) one of the two sections of the gobelet du roi ('King's drinking-cup) with a staff of 12 sommeliers, four aides, one garde-vaiselle (for the dirty dishes), two porte(u)rs and a lavandier (laundryman), helping him to wash, prepare and gather again all the royal table utensils, as well as the bread. In time some of these duties were transferred to other sections, so his function at the King's table became ceremonial. Under the Sun King his was one of the seven sections of the bouche du Roi or king's table.

He did gain several privileges, including jurisdiction over the (monopolistic) corporation of bakers in Paris. The office was made hereditary in the noble family of Cossé de Brissac in the 16th century; the last incumbent died in 1792.

In heraldry, he placed below his shield, left and right, a nef d'or and a cadenas, golden objects placed near the King's setting at the table.

== Elsewhere ==
- The equivalent in the Kingdom of Scotland was the Pantler of Scotland
- The Romanian equivalent was the boier title of Pitar
- At the Court of the count of Flanders, see Broodmeester of Flanders

== Sources ==
- Heraldica.org- France- the King's Household
