= Cent-Suisses =

Swiss mercenary group serving French kings

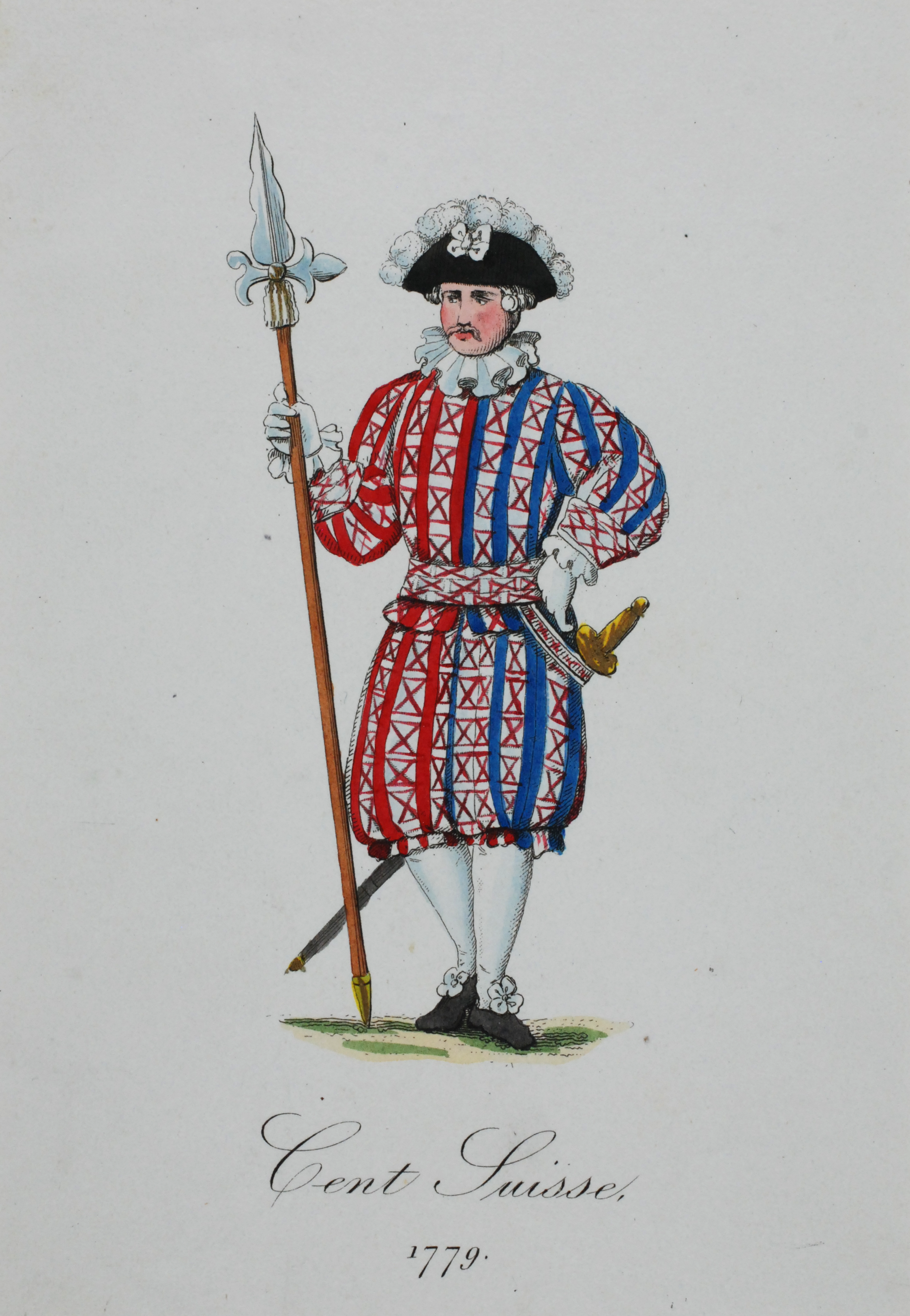
- Full dress uniform, 1779
- Active: 1471–1792; 1814–1830
- Allegiance: King of France
- Branch: Maison militaire du roi de France
- Type: Infantry
- Role: Royal guard, honor guard
- Size: 100
- Motto: Ea est fiducia gentis ("Such is the loyalty of this nation")

The Cent-Suisses (French pronunciation: [sɑ̃ sɥis], Hundred Swiss) were an elite infantry company of Swiss mercenaries that served the French kings from 1471 to 1792 and from 1814 to 1830.

== History ==
The unit was created in 1471 by King Louis XI. Originally, the company was composed of a hundred men, all from Switzerland and armed with halberds, who were selected for their above-average height. As the weapons of the time evolved, notably with the appearance of firearms, its members were divided between pikemen and arquebusiers.

When Swiss mercenaries learned that King Charles VIII was preparing an expedition against Naples, they rushed en masse to be recruited. By the end of 1494, thousands of them were in Rome to join the French Royal Army which would occupy Naples the following February. In 1495, the king's life was saved thanks to the actions of his Swiss infantrymen. Louis de Menthon was appointed the first commander of the Cent-Suisses in 1496. The unit was part of the Maison militaire du roi de France (military household of the king of France).

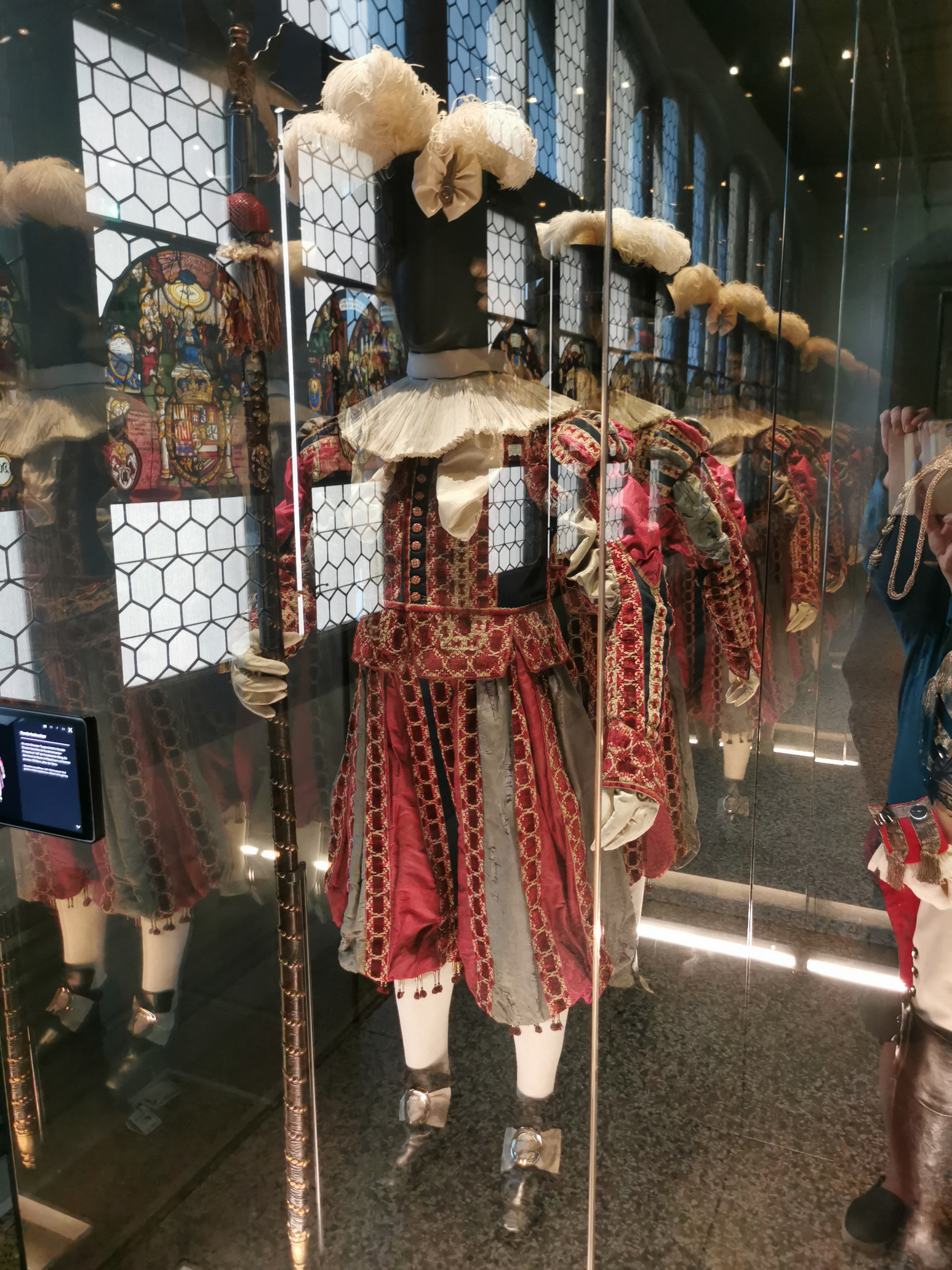
Ceremonial uniform of the Cent-Suisses at the Swiss National Museum, Zürich

The Cent-Suisses were dissolved by the Legislative Assembly on 12 May 1792, during the French Revolution, and therefore survived (unlike the Swiss Guards) the storming of the Tuileries on 10 August 1792. Along with the rest of the royal household, it was first re-established in the spring of 1814, at the start of the First Bourbon Restoration, and again in 1815 under the Second Restoration. After resuming its historic function as a ceremonial palace guard, now at the Tuileries, in 1817 detachments from the French regiments of the post-Restoration Royal Guard were transferred to the unit, and the Cent-Suisses company was renamed the Compagnie des gardes à pied ordinaires du corps du Roi. It was finally disbanded during the July Revolution in 1830.

The Cent-Suisses served as model for a military unit of the Duchy of Savoy (later Kingdom of Sardinia), which was created in 1579 and disbanded in 1798. Other similar units existed in Tuscany, Austria (1745), and Brandenburg (1696–1713). The Pontifical Swiss Guard, founded in 1506, belongs to this tradition.

== Organization ==
The Cent-Suisses were commanded by a Swiss captain with two lieutenants, one Swiss and the other French, under his orders. Members of the unit had the right to be tried according to the laws of their country of origin, and the royal household therefore included a military court for the Cent-Suisses.

== Gallery ==
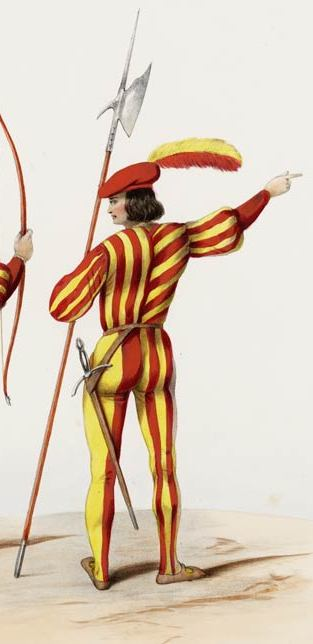
Cent-Suisse during the reign of Louis XII, c. 1507

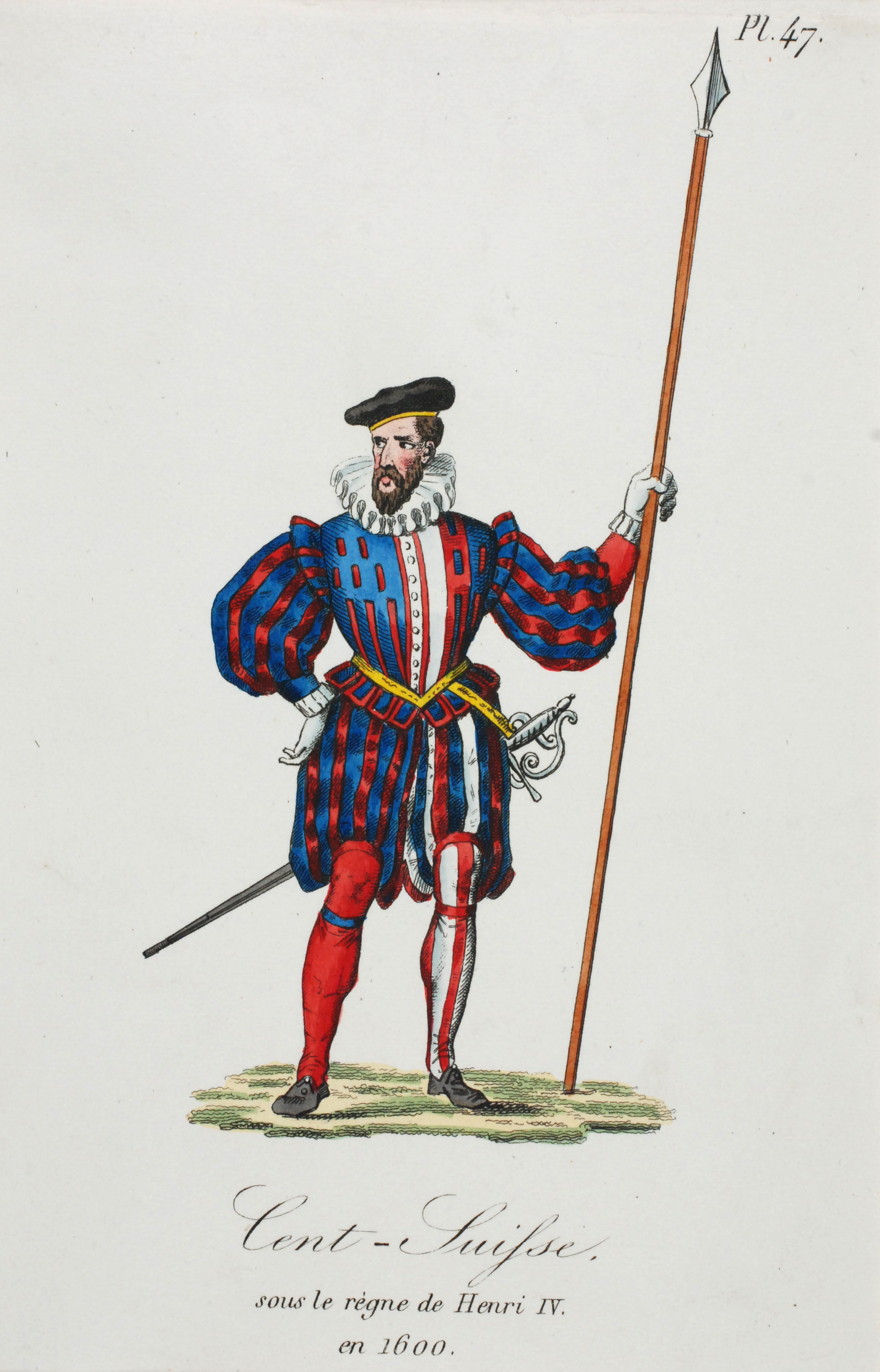
Cent-Suisse during the reign of Henry IV, 1600

Cent-Suisse drummer during the Bourbon Restoration, 1814–1817

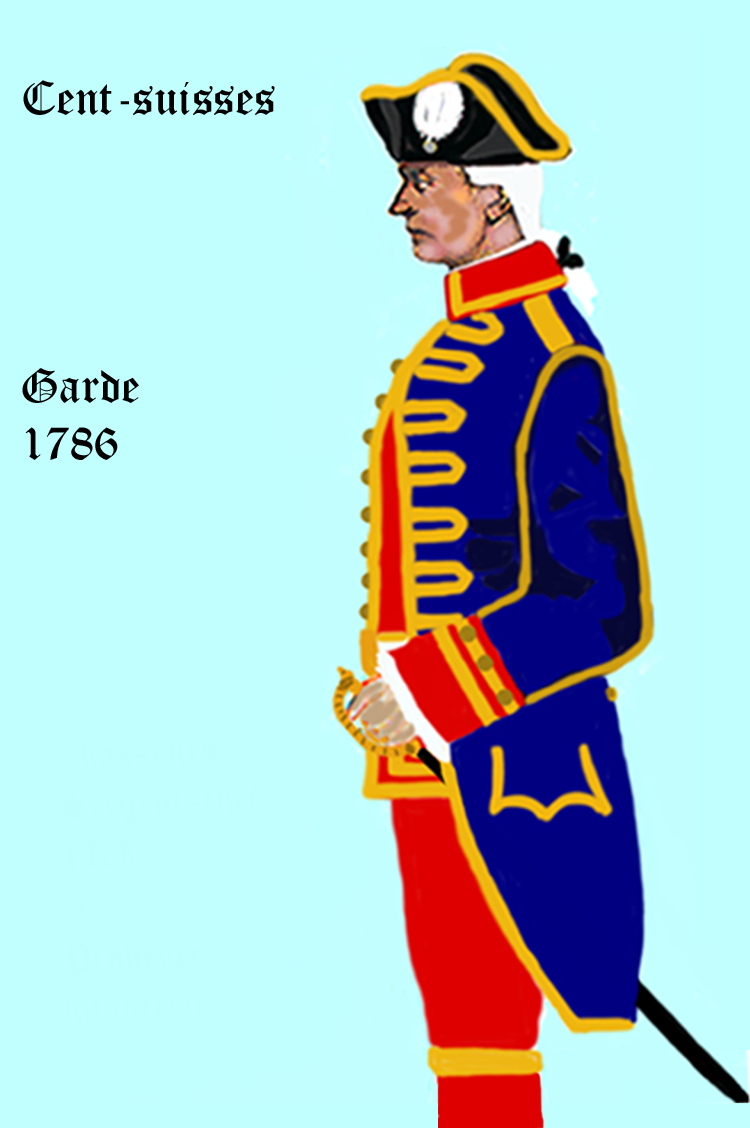
Court service uniform, 1786

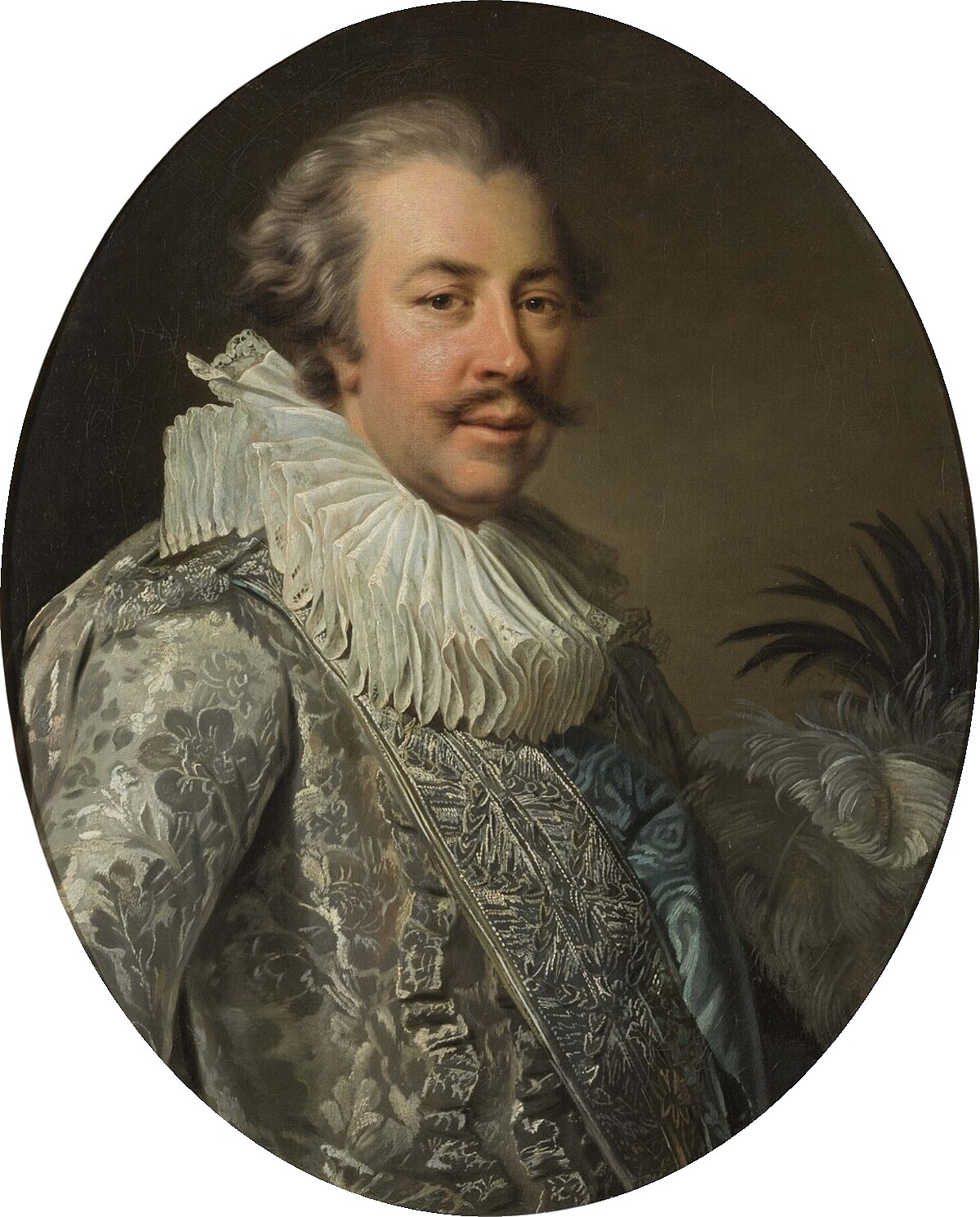
Louis Hercule Timoléon de Cossé-Brissac as commander (capitaine-colonel) of the Cent-Suisses, c. 1770

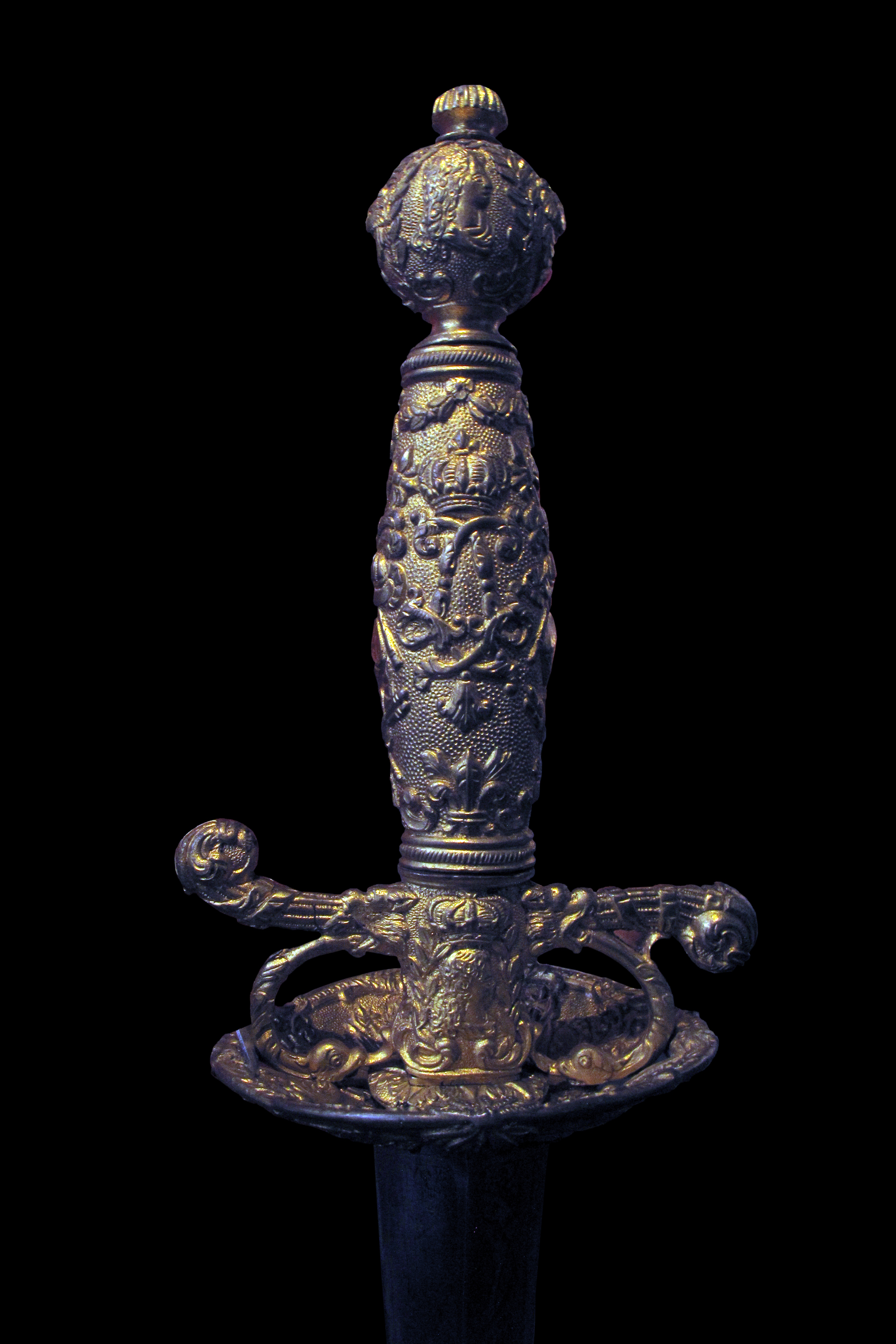
Cent-Suisses parade sword at the Musée de l'Armée, Paris

== See also ==
- Swiss mercenaries
- Swiss Guards
- French Guards Regiment
- Gardes du Corps du Roi (France)
- List of Royal French foreign regiments
