= Montchanin =

- Commune
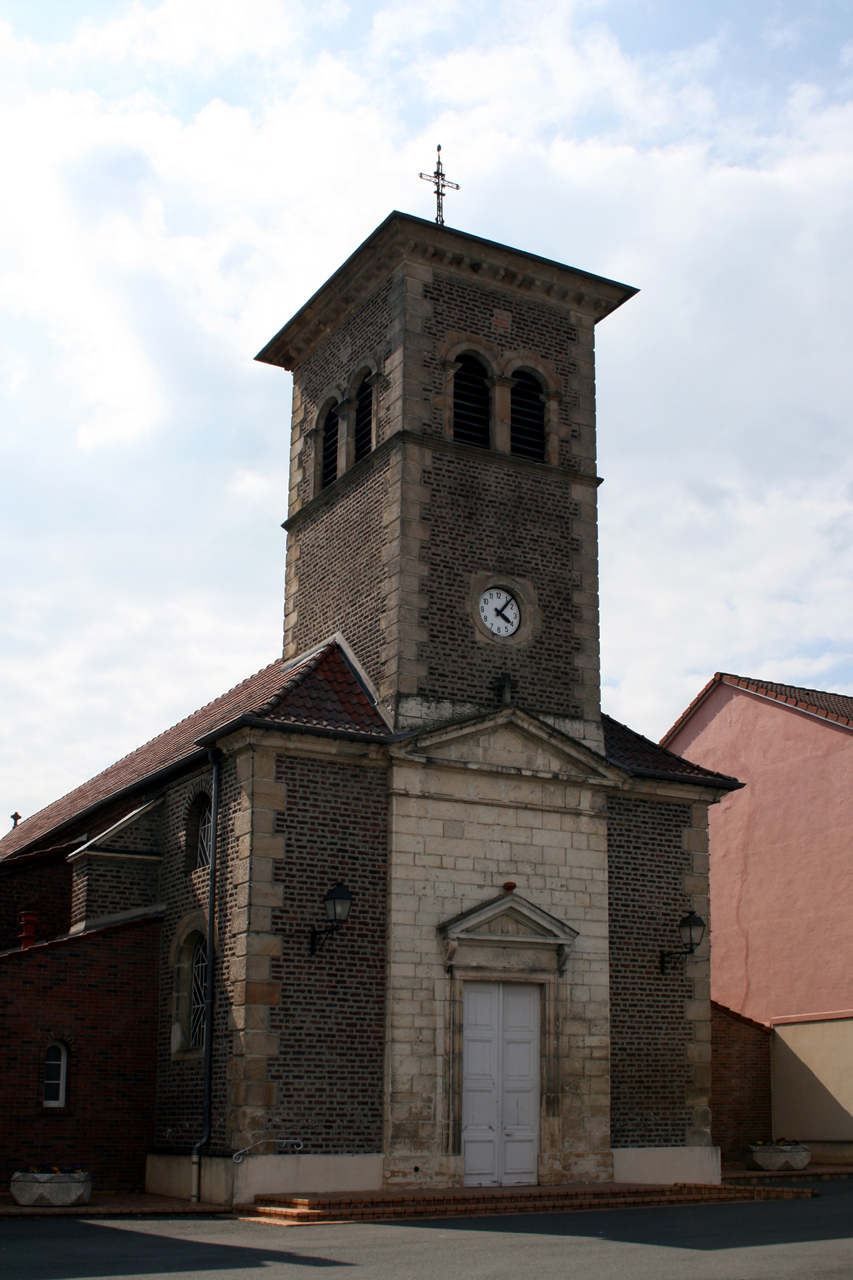
- The church in Montchanin

- Coat of arms
- Location of Montchanin
- Location within France Location within Bourgogne-Franche-Comté
- Coordinates: 46°44′56″N 4°28′11″E
- Country: France
- Region: Bourgogne-Franche-Comté
- Department: Saône-et-Loire
- Arrondissement: Autun
- Canton: Blanzy
- Intercommunality: CU Creusot Montceau

Government
  - Mayor (2023–2026): Yohann Cassier
- Area^{1}: 7.82 km^{2} (3.02 sq mi)
- Elevation: 325 m (1,066 ft)
- Highest elevation: 351 m (1,152 ft)
- Lowest elevation: 298 m (978 ft)
- Population (2023): 4,976
  - Density: 636/km^{2} (1,650/sq mi)
- Time zone: UTC+01:00 (CET)
  - Summer (DST): UTC+02:00 (CEST)
- INSEE/Postal code: 71310 /71210
- Website: www.ville-montchanin.fr
- ^{1} French Land Register data, which excludes lakes, ponds, glaciers > 1 km^{2} (0.386 sq mi or 247 acres) and river estuaries.

Montchanin (French pronunciation: [mɔ̃ʃanɛ̃]) is a commune in the Saône-et-Loire department in the region of Bourgogne-Franche-Comté in eastern France.

The town finds its history during the Industrial Revolution in France in the 19th century, being famous for its terracotta tiles and for its coal mines being active between 1820 and 1912.

== Population ==
Historical population
Year	Pop.	±% p.a.
1968	6,408	—
1975	6,279	−0.29%
1982	6,263	−0.04%
1990	5,960	−0.62%
1999	5,593	−0.70%
2007	5,505	−0.20%
2012	5,307	−0.73%
2017	5,030	−1.07%
2023	4,976	−0.18%
Source: INSEE

== See also ==
- Communes of the Saône-et-Loire department
- Montchanin coal mine
