= Eugène Delacroix =

French painter (1798–1863)

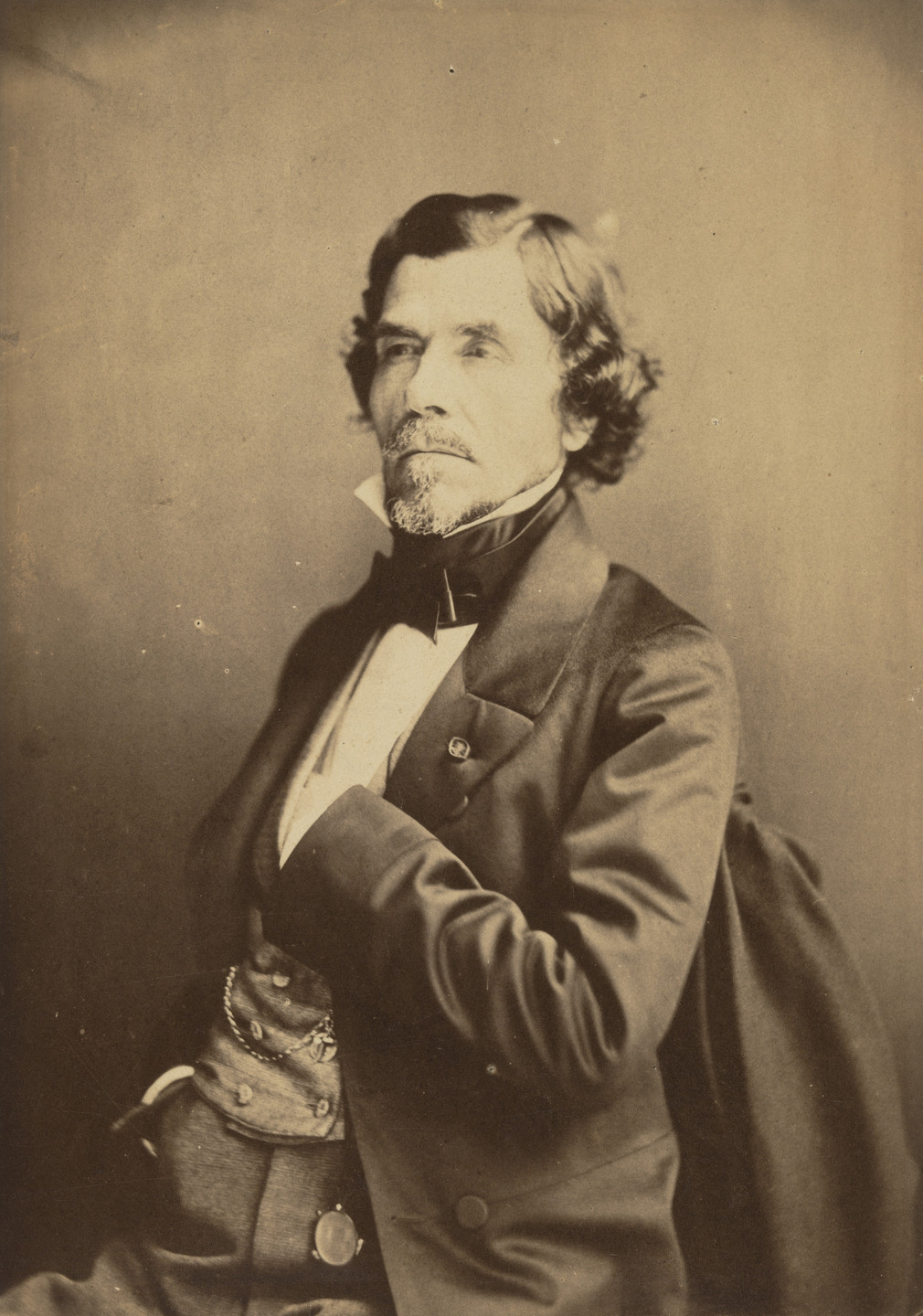
- Portrait by Nadar, c. 1857
- Born: Ferdinand Victor Eugène Delacroix; 26 April 1798; Charenton-Saint-Maurice, Seine, France
- Died: 13 August 1863 (aged 65); Paris, France
- Resting place: Père Lachaise Cemetery
- Known for: Painting, lithography
- Notable work: The Barque of Dante (1822); The Massacre at Chios (1824); Liberty Leading the People (1830)
- Movement: Romanticism
- Father: Charles-François Delacroix (legal father); Charles Maurice de Talleyrand-Périgord (alleged biological father)
- Relatives: Charles-Henri Delacroix (brother); Henriette de Verninac (sister)

Ferdinand Victor Eugène Delacroix (/ˈdɛləkrwɑː, ˌdɛləˈkrwɑː/ DEL-ə-krwah, -KRWAH; French: [øʒɛn dəlakʁwa]; 26 April 1798 – 13 August 1863) was a French Romantic artist who was regarded as the leader of the French Romantic school.

In contrast to the Neoclassical perfectionism of his chief rival Ingres, Delacroix took for his inspiration the art of Rubens and painters of the Venetian Renaissance, with an attendant emphasis on colour and movement rather than clarity of outline and carefully modelled form. Dramatic and romantic content characterized the central themes of his maturity, and led him not to the classical models of Greek and Roman art, but to travel in North Africa in search of the exotic. Friend and spiritual heir to Théodore Géricault, Delacroix was also inspired by Lord Byron, with whom he shared a strong identification with the "forces of the sublime" of nature in often violent action.

However, Delacroix was given to neither sentimentality nor bombast, and his Romanticism was that of an individualist. In the words of Baudelaire, "Delacroix was passionately in love with passion, but coldly determined to express passion as clearly as possible." Together with Ingres, Delacroix is considered one of the last old Masters of painting and is one of the few who was ever photographed.

As a painter and muralist, Delacroix's use of expressive brushstrokes and his study of the optical effects of colour profoundly shaped the work of the Impressionists, while his passion for the exotic inspired the artists of the Symbolist movement. A fine lithographer, Delacroix illustrated various works of William Shakespeare, the Scottish author Walter Scott, and the German author Johann Wolfgang von Goethe.

== Early life ==
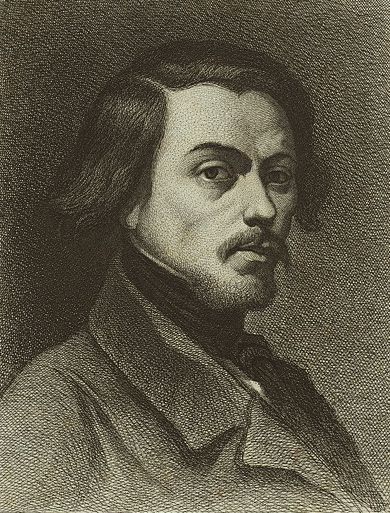
Portrait of Delacroix early in his career

Eugène Delacroix was born on 26 April 1798 at Charenton-Saint-Maurice in Seine, near Paris. His mother was Victoire Oeben, the daughter of the cabinetmaker Jean-François Oeben. He had three much older siblings: Charles-Henri Delacroix (1779–1845) rose to the rank of General in Napoleon's army; Henriette (1780–1827) married the diplomat Raymond de Verninac Saint-Maur (1762–1822); Henri Delacroix was born in 1770 and killed at the Battle of Friedland on 14 June 1807.

There are medical reasons to believe that Eugène's legal father, Charles-François Delacroix, was not able to procreate at the time of Eugène's conception. Talleyrand, who was a friend of the family and successor of Charles Delacroix as Minister of Foreign Affairs, and whom the adult Eugène resembled in appearance and character, considered himself as his real father. After assuming his office as foreign minister, Talleyrand dispatched Charles Delacroix to The Hague in the capacity of French ambassador to the then Batavian Republic. Delacroix, who at the time suffered from erectile dysfunction, returned to Paris in early September 1797 to find his wife pregnant. (Note: André Castelot discusses and rejects the theory of Eugène's paternity, pointing out that correspondence between Charles and his wife during the pregnancy shows no sign of tension or resentment.) Talleyrand went on to assist Eugène in the form of numerous anonymous commissions. Throughout his career as a painter, the younger Delacroix was protected by Talleyrand, who served successively the Restoration and King Louis-Philippe, and ultimately as ambassador of France in Great Britain, and later by Charles Auguste Louis Joseph, duc de Morny, half-brother of Napoleon III, grandson of Talleyrand, and speaker of the French House of Commons. His legitimate father, Charles Delacroix, died in 1805, and his mother in 1814, leaving 16-year-old Eugène an orphan.

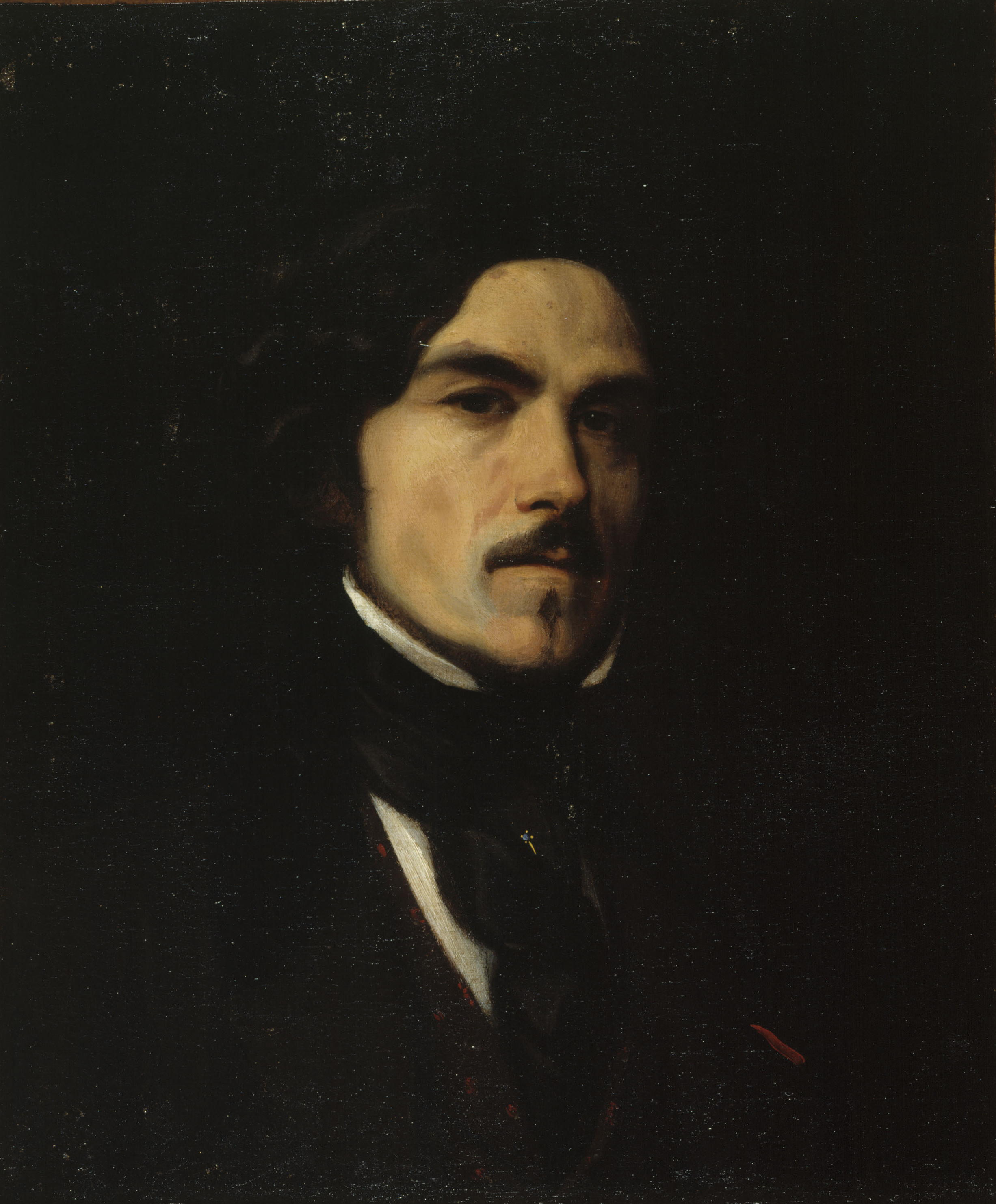
Portrait of Delacroix c. 1840 by Charles-Émile-Callande de Champmartin, Musée Carnavalet

His early education was at the Lycée Louis-le-Grand, and at the Lycée Pierre Corneille in Rouen where he steeped himself in the classics and won awards for drawing. In 1815 he began his training with Pierre-Narcisse Guérin in the neoclassical style of Jacques-Louis David. An early church commission, The Virgin of the Harvest (1819), displays a Raphael-esque influence, but another such commission, The Virgin of the Sacred Heart (1821), evidences a freer interpretation. It precedes the influence of the more colourful and rich style of the Flemish Baroque painter Peter Paul Rubens, and fellow French artist Théodore Géricault, whose works marked an introduction to Romanticism in art.

The impact of Géricault's The Raft of the Medusa was profound, and stimulated Delacroix to produce his first major painting, The Barque of Dante, which was accepted by the Paris Salon of 1822. The work caused a sensation, and was largely derided by the public and officialdom, yet was purchased by the State for the Luxembourg Galleries; the pattern of widespread opposition to his work, countered by a vigorous, enlightened support, would continue throughout his life. Two years later he again achieved popular success for his The Massacre at Chios.

== Career ==
=== Chios and Missolonghi ===
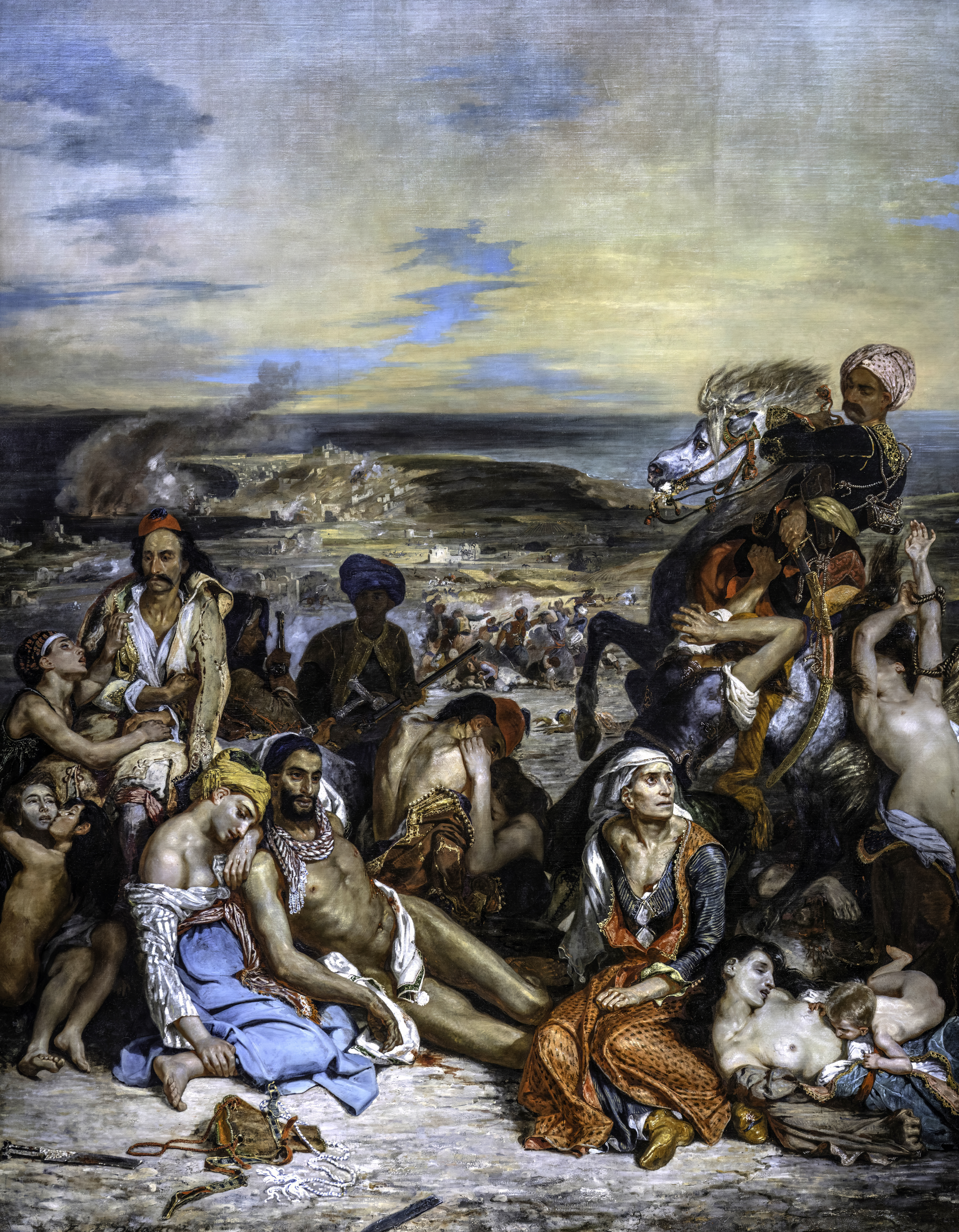
The Massacre at Chios (1824)

Delacroix's painting of Chios Massacre during the Greek civil wars of 1823–1825 shows dying Greek civilians rounded up for enslavement by the Ottoman Empire. This is one of several paintings he made of contemporary events, expressing the official policy for the Greek cause in Greek War of Independence against the Turks, the English, the Russians, and the French governments. Delacroix was quickly recognized by the authorities as a leading painter in the new Romantic style, and the picture was bought by the state. His depiction of suffering was controversial, however, as there was no glorious event taking place, no patriots raising their swords in valour as in David's Oath of the Horatii, only a disaster. Many critics deplored the painting's despairing tone; the artist Antoine-Jean Gros called it "a massacre of art".

The pathos in the depiction of an infant clutching its dead mother had an especially powerful effect, although this detail was condemned as unfit for art by Delacroix's critics. A viewing of the paintings of John Constable and the watercolour sketches and art of Richard Parkes Bonnington prompted Delacroix to make extensive, freely painted changes to the sky and distant landscape.

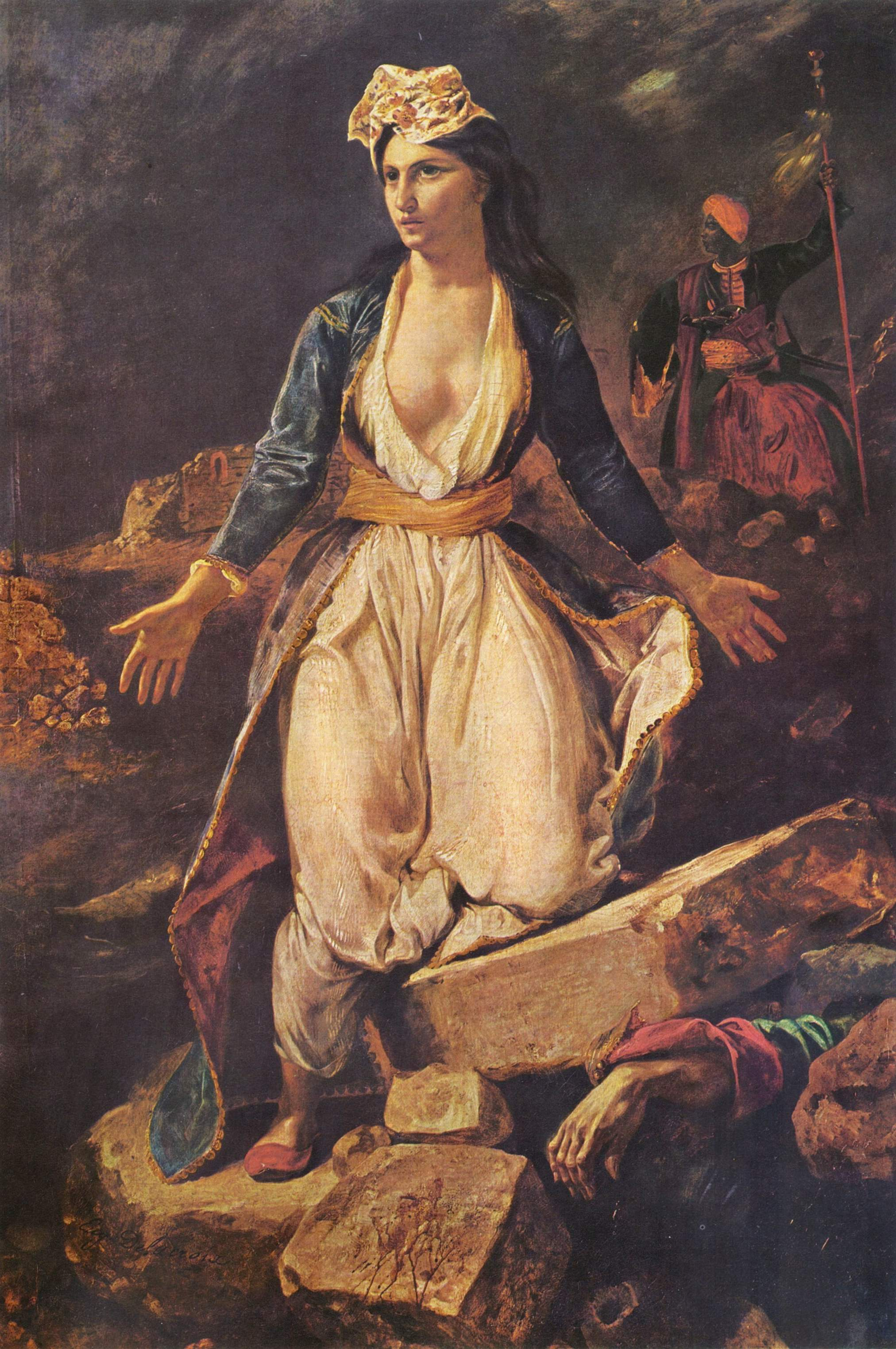
Greece on the Ruins of Missolonghi (1826), Musée des beaux-arts de Bordeaux

Delacroix produced a second painting in support of the Greeks in their war for independence, this time referring to the capture of Missolonghi by Turkish forces in 1825. With a restrained palette appropriate to the allegory, "Greece Expiring on the Ruins of Missolonghi" depicts a woman in Greek costume with her breast bared, arms half-raised in an imploring gesture before the horrific scene: the suicide of the Greeks, who chose to kill themselves and destroy their city rather than surrender to the Turks. A hand is visible at the bottom, the body having been crushed by rubble. The painting serves as a monument to the people of Missolonghi and to the idea of freedom against tyrannical rule. This event interested Delacroix not only for his sympathies with the Greeks, but also because the poet Byron, whom Delacroix greatly admired, had died there.

=== Romanticism ===
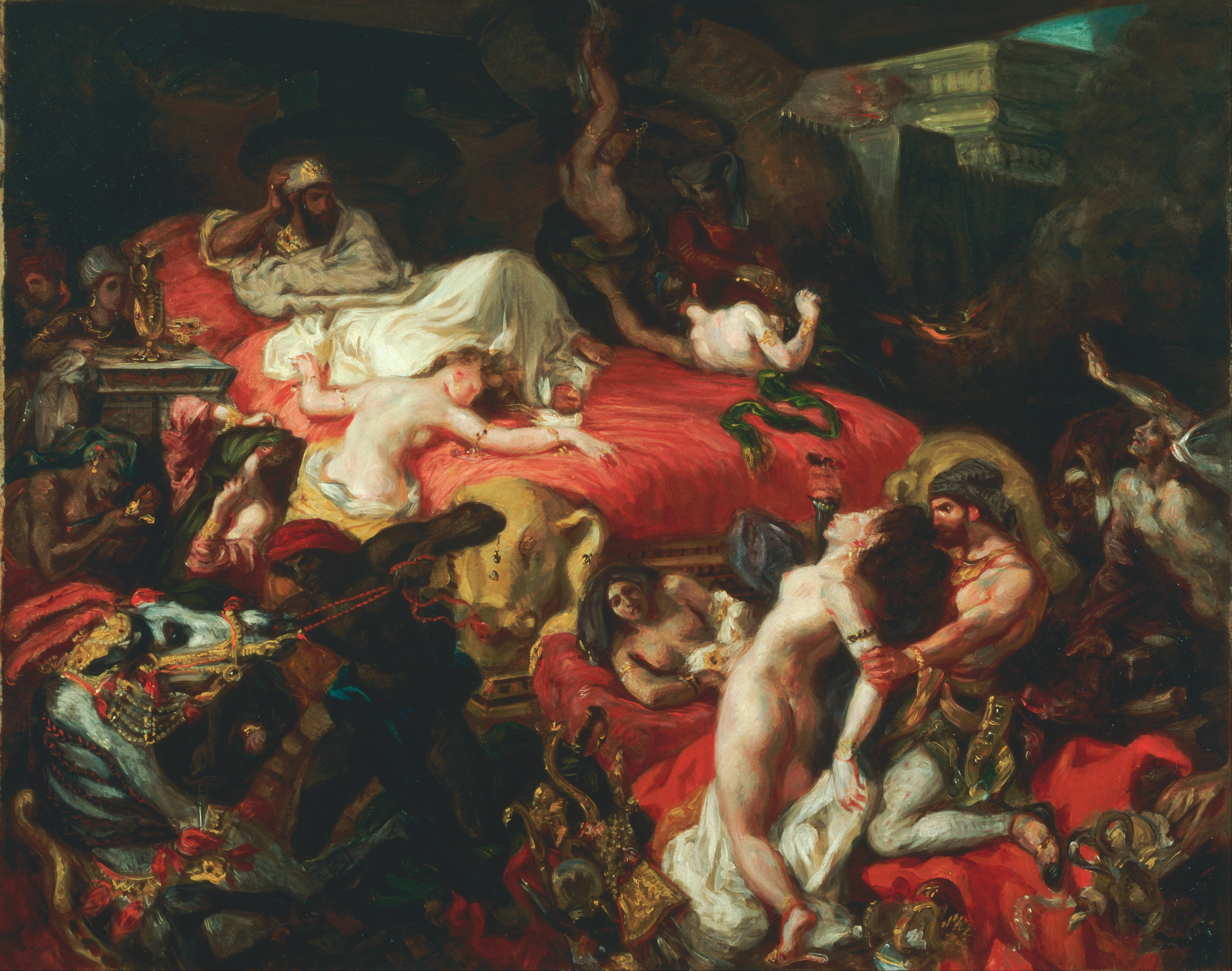
The Death of Sardanapalus (1827), Philadelphia Museum of Art

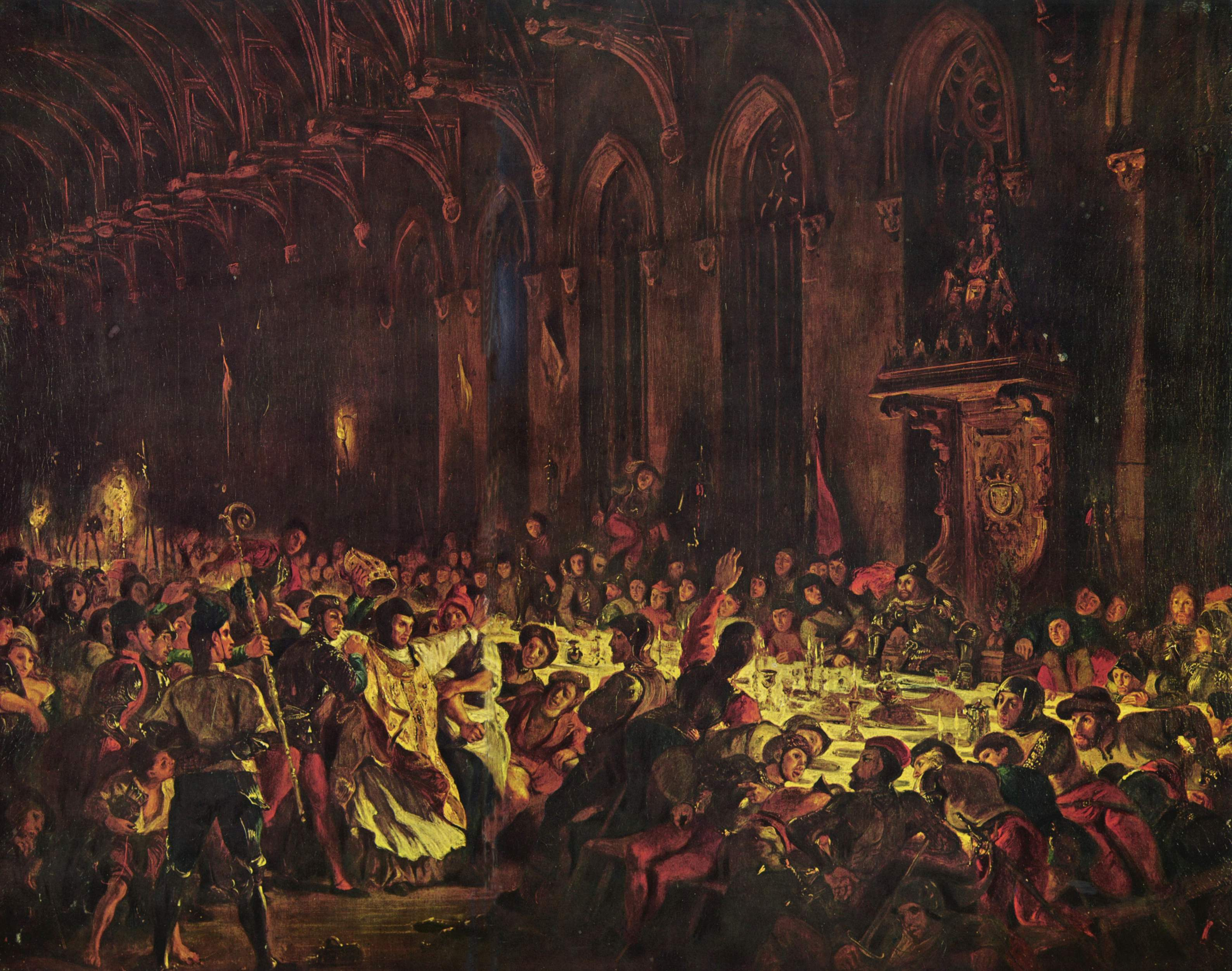
The Murder of the Bishop of Liège, (1829), Louvre Museum

A trip to England in 1825 included visits to Thomas Lawrence and Richard Parkes Bonington, and the colour and handling of English painting provided impetus for his only full-length portrait, the elegant Portrait of Louis-Auguste Schwiter (1826–30). At roughly the same time, Delacroix was creating romantic works of numerous themes, many of which would continue to interest him for over thirty years. By 1825, he was producing lithographs illustrating Shakespeare, and soon thereafter lithographs and paintings from Goethe's Faust. Paintings such as The Combat of the Giaour and Hassan (1826), and Woman with Parrot (1827), introduced subjects of violence and sensuality which would prove to be recurrent.

These various romantic strands came together in The Death of Sardanapalus (1827–28). Delacroix's painting of the death of the Assyrian king Sardanapalus shows an emotionally stirring scene alive with colours, exotic costumes and tragic events. The Death of Sardanapalus depicts the besieged king watching impassively as guards carry out his orders to kill his servants, concubines and animals. The literary source is a play by Byron, although the play does not specifically mention any massacre of concubines.

Sardanapalus' attitude of calm detachment is a familiar pose in Romantic imagery in this period in Europe. The painting, which was not exhibited again for many years afterward, has been regarded by some critics as a gruesome fantasy involving death and lust. Especially shocking is the struggle of a nude woman whose throat is about to be cut, a scene placed prominently in the foreground for maximum impact. However, the sensuous beauty and exotic colours of the composition make the picture appear pleasing and shocking at the same time.

A variety of Romantic interests were again synthesized in The Murder of the Bishop of Liège (1829). It also borrowed from a literary source, this time Scott, and depicts a scene from the Middle Ages, that of the murder of Louis de Bourbon, Bishop of Liège amidst an orgy sponsored by his captor, William de la Marck. Set in an immense vaulted interior which Delacroix based on sketches of the Palais de Justice in Rouen and Westminster Hall, the drama plays out in chiaroscuro, organized around a brilliantly lit stretch of tablecloth. In 1855, a critic described the painting's vibrant handling as "Less finished than a painting, more finished than a sketch, The Murder of the Bishop of Liège was left by the painter at that supreme moment when one more stroke of the brush would have ruined everything".

=== Liberty Leading the People ===
Liberty Leading the People (1830), Louvre, Paris

Delacroix's most influential work came in 1830 with the painting Liberty Leading the People, which for choice of subject and technique highlights the differences between the romantic approach and the neoclassical style. Less obviously, it also differs from the Romanticism of Géricault, as exemplified by The Raft of the Medusa.

Delacroix felt his composition more vividly as a whole, thought of his figures and crowds as types, and dominated them by the symbolic figure of Republican Liberty which is one of his finest plastic inventions...

Probably Delacroix's best-known painting, Liberty Leading the People is an unforgettable image of Parisians, having taken up arms, marching forward under the banner of the tricolour representing liberty, equality, and fraternity. Although Delacroix was inspired by contemporary events to invoke this romantic image of the spirit of liberty, he seems to be trying to convey the will and character of the people, rather than glorifying the actual event, the 1830 revolution against Charles X, which did little other than bring a different king, Louis Philippe I, to power. The warriors lying dead in the foreground offer poignant counterpoint to the symbolic female figure, who is illuminated triumphantly against a background of smoke.

Although the French government bought the painting, by 1832 officials deemed its glorification of liberty too inflammatory and removed it from public view. Nonetheless, Delacroix still received many government commissions for murals and ceiling paintings.

Following the Revolution of 1848 that saw the end of the reign of King Louis Philippe, Liberty Leading the People was finally put on display by the newly elected president, Louis Napoleon (Napoleon III). It is exhibited in the Louvre museum in Paris; although from December 2012 until 2014 it was on exhibit at Louvre-Lens in Lens, Pas-de-Calais.

The boy holding a pistol aloft on the right is sometimes thought to be an inspiration for the Gavroche character in Victor Hugo's 1862 novel, Les Misérables.

=== Religious works ===
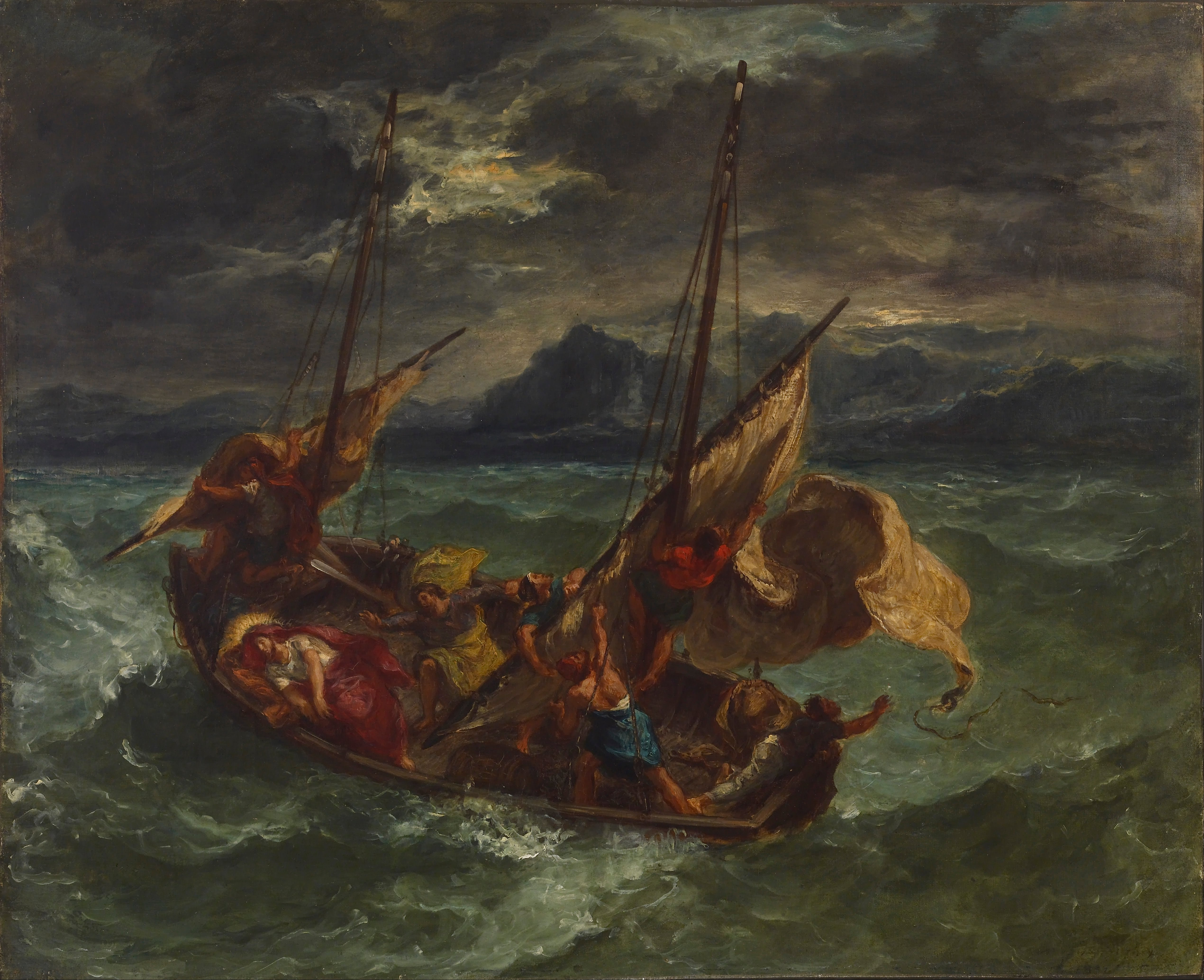
Christ on the Sea of Galilee, 1854

Delacroix painted hundreds of religious works in his lifetime and had a strong interest in Christianity. He had many commissions for religious paintings, including pieces for the Saints-Anges chapel of Saint-Sulpice in Paris. His religious paintings and style would shift drastically depending on the needs of the commission.

Some of his religious works, such as Christ on the Sea of Galilee, had multiple painted versions. Delacroix's Pietà, a painting of the Virgin Mary mourning Christ after his death, was eventually redone by Vincent van Gogh.

Delacroix reflected on religion through his paintings, and his religious works often show subtle details to Biblical texts. While considered an unbeliever or agnostic, his journal and paintings reveal an openness and receptiveness to spirituality through his art.

== Travel to North Africa ==
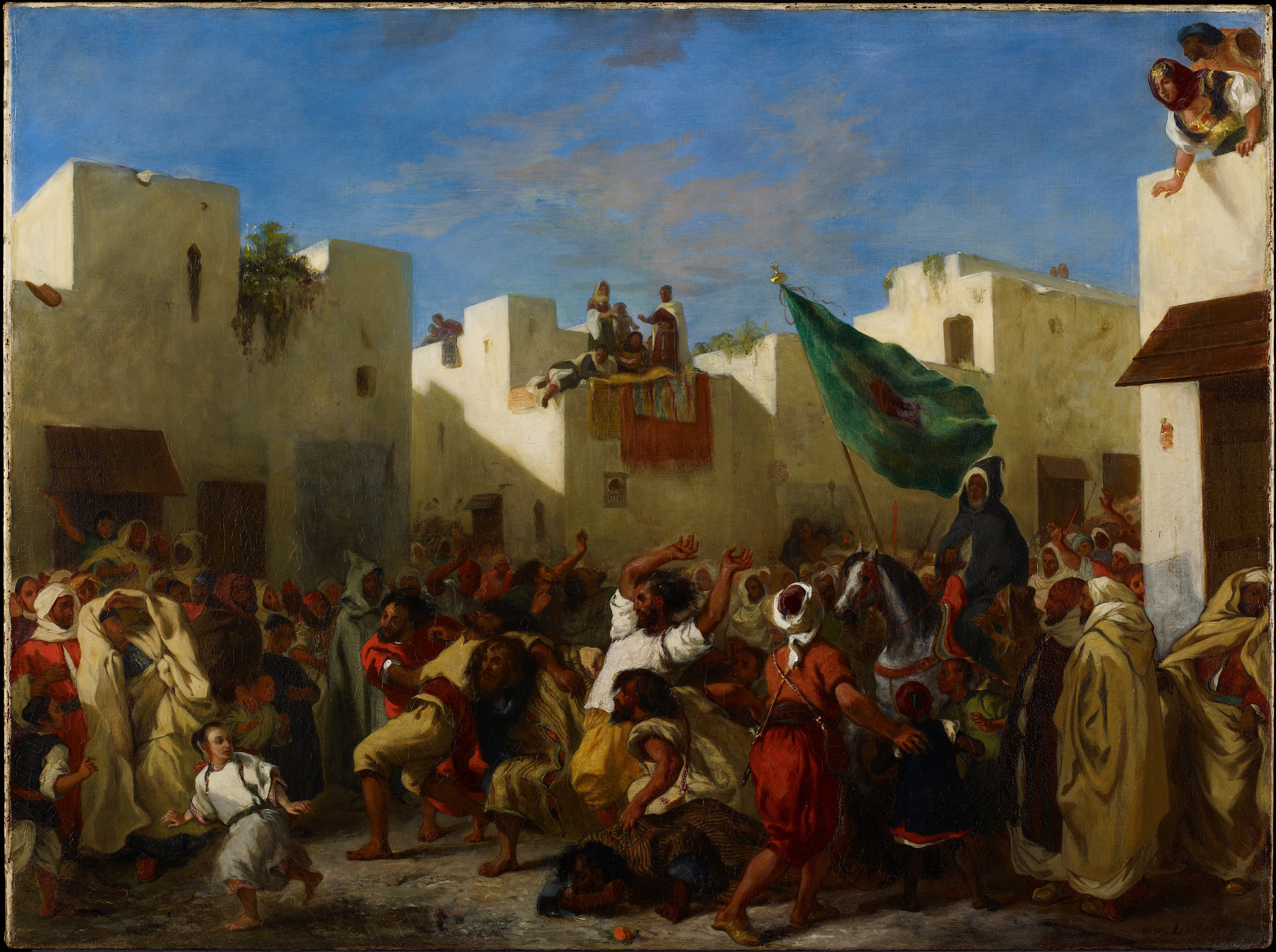
Convulsionists of Tangiers (1838), Minneapolis Institute of Art.

In 1832, Delacroix traveled to Spain and North Africa in company with the diplomat Charles-Edgar de Mornay, as part of a diplomatic mission to Morocco shortly after the French conquered Algeria. He went not primarily to study art, but to escape from the civilization of Paris, in hopes of seeing a more "primitive" culture. He eventually produced over 100 paintings and drawings of scenes from or based on the life of the people of North Africa, and added a new and personal chapter to the interest in Orientalism.

Delacroix was entranced by the people and their clothes, and the trip would inform the subject matter of a great many of his future paintings. He believed that the North Africans, in their attire and their attitudes, provided a visual equivalent to the people of Classical Rome and Greece:

The Greeks and Romans are here at my door, in the Arabs who wrap themselves in a white blanket and look like Cato or Brutus...

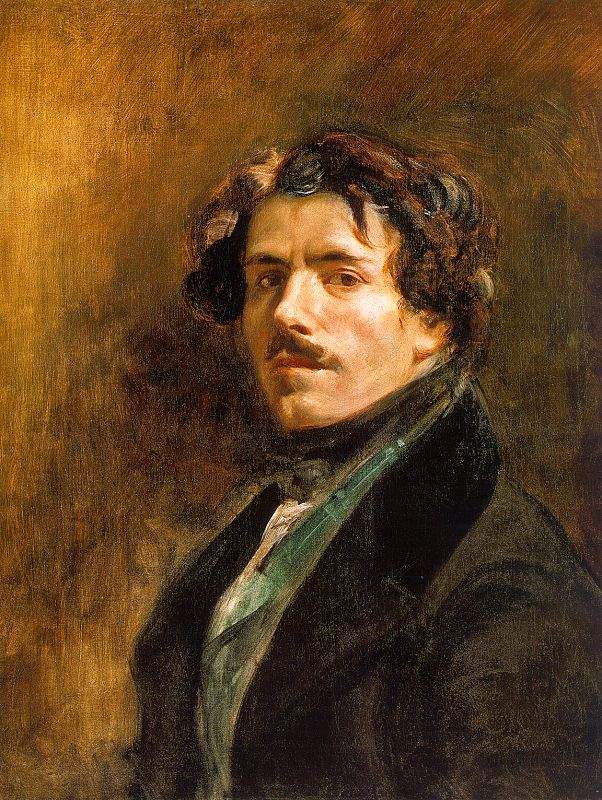
Self-portrait, 1837. "Eugène Delacroix was a curious mixture of skepticism, politeness, dandyism, willpower, cleverness, despotism, and finally, a kind of special goodness and tenderness that always accompanies genius."

Delacroix managed to sketch some women secretly in Algiers, as in the painting Women of Algiers in their Apartment (1834), but generally he encountered difficulty in finding Muslim women to pose for him because of Muslim rules requiring that women be covered. Less problematic was the painting of Jewish women in North Africa, as subjects for the Jewish Wedding in Morocco (1839).

While in Tangier, Delacroix made many sketches of the people and the city, subjects to which he would return until the end of his life. Animals—the embodiment of romantic passion—were incorporated into paintings such as Arab Horses Fighting in a Stable (1860), The Lion Hunt (the many extant versions were painted between 1856 and 1861), and Arab Saddling his Horse (1855).

== Musical inspirations ==
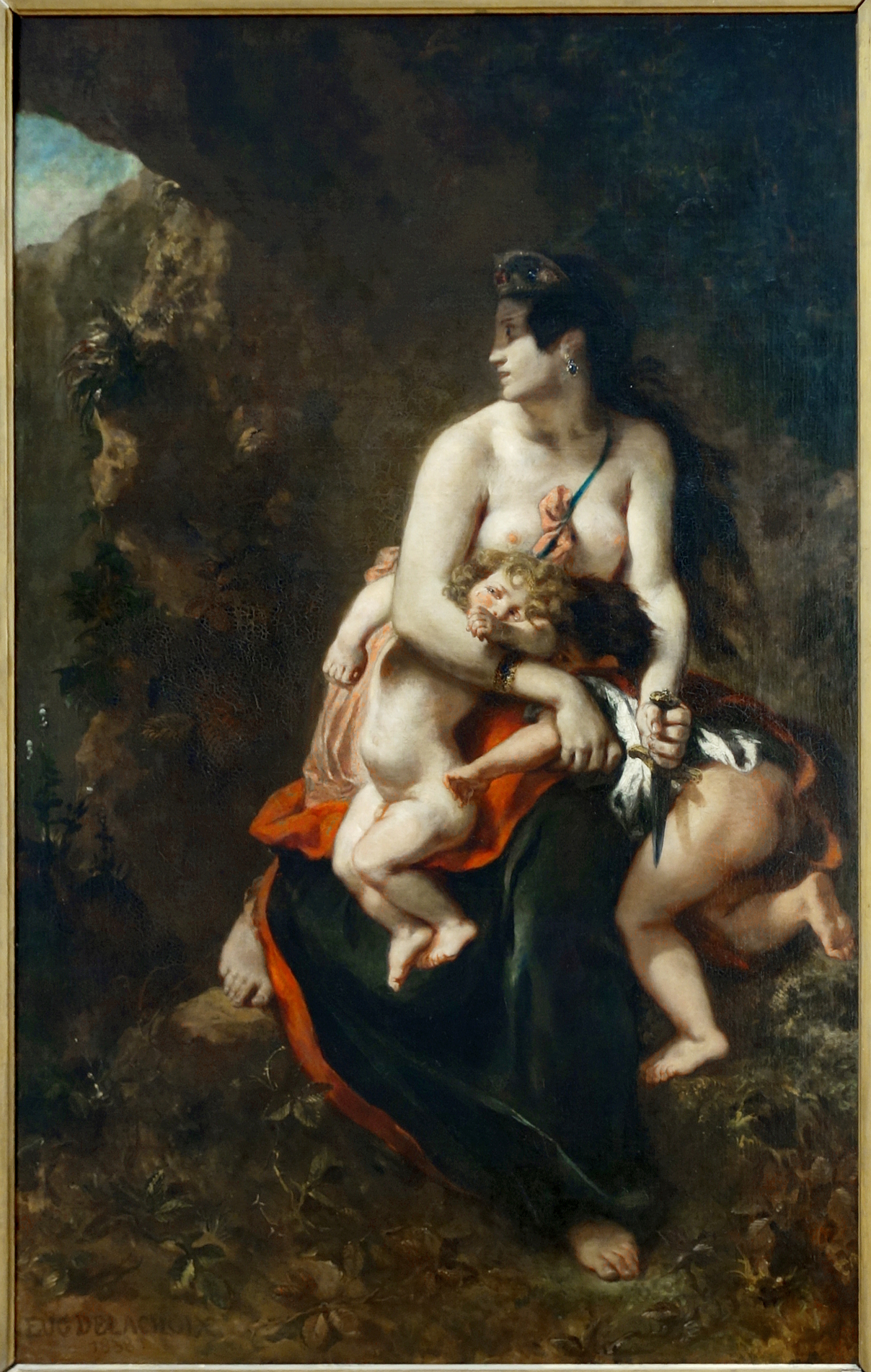
Medea about to Kill Her Children, 1838

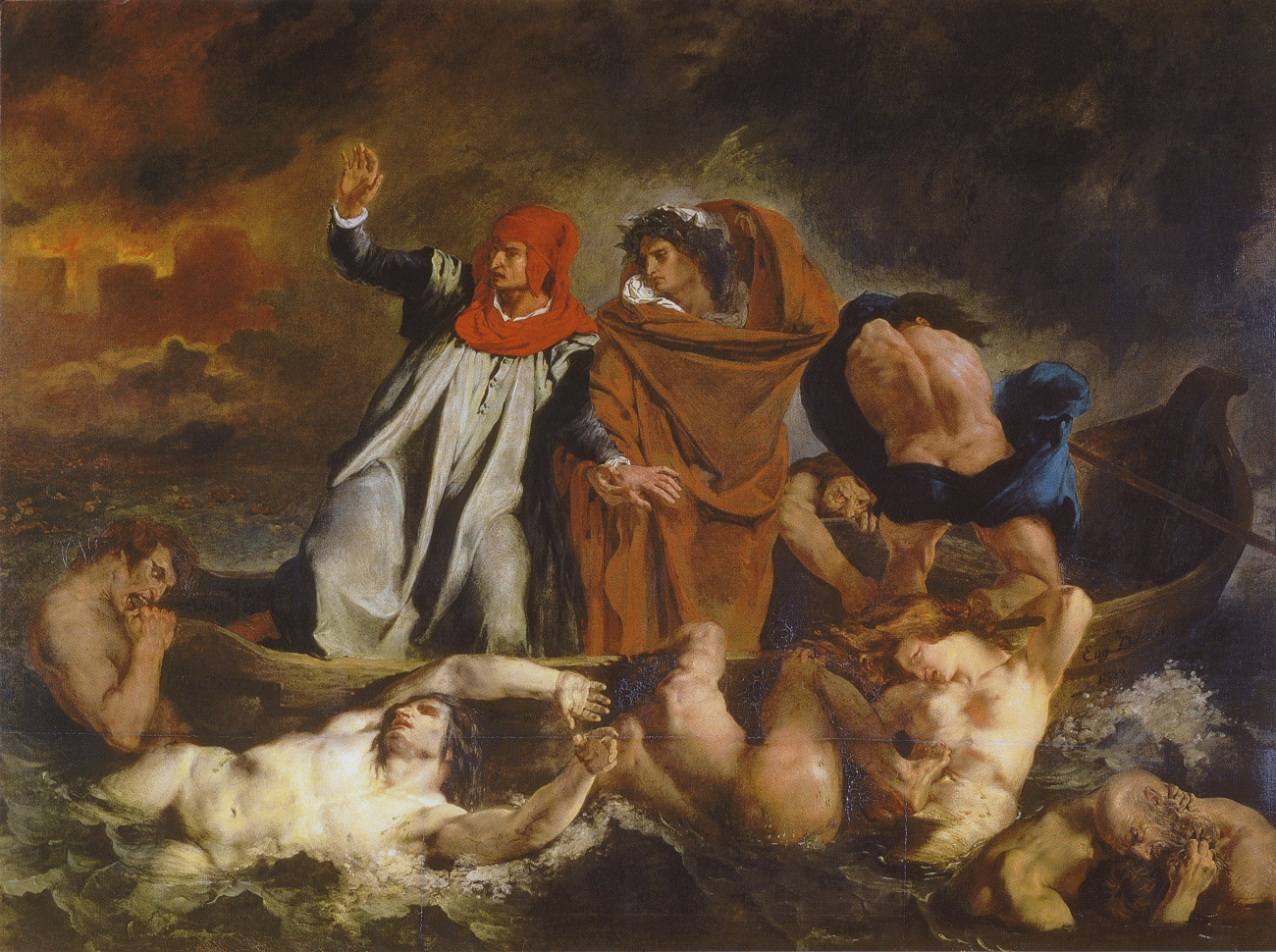
The Barque of Dante (1822), Louvre

Delacroix drew inspiration from many sources over his career, such as the literary works of William Shakespeare and Lord Byron, and the artistry of Michelangelo. But, throughout his life, he felt a constant need for music, saying in 1855 that "nothing can be compared with the emotion caused by music; that it expresses incomparable shades of feeling." He also said, while working at Saint-Sulpice, that music put him in a state of "exaltation" that inspired his painting. It was often from music, whether the most melancholy renditions of Chopin or the "pastoral" works of Beethoven, that Delacroix was able to draw the most emotion and inspiration. At one point during his life, Delacroix befriended and made portraits of the composer Chopin; in his journal, Delacroix praised him frequently.

== Murals and later life ==
In 1838 Delacroix exhibited Medea about to Kill Her Children, which created a sensation at the Salon. His first large-scale treatment of a scene from Greek mythology, the painting depicts Medea clutching her children, dagger drawn to slay them in vengeance for her abandonment by Jason. The three nude figures form an animated pyramid, bathed in a raking light that penetrates the grotto in which Medea has hidden. Though the painting was quickly purchased by the State, Delacroix was disappointed when it was sent to the Lille Musée des Beaux-Arts; he had intended for it to hang at the Luxembourg, where it would have joined The Barque of Dante and Scenes from the Massacres of Chios.

From 1833 on Delacroix received numerous commissions to decorate public buildings in Paris. In that year he began work for the Salon du Roi in the Chambre des Députés, Palais Bourbon, which was not completed until 1837, and began a lifelong friendship with the female artist Marie-Élisabeth Blavot-Boulanger. For the next ten years he painted in both the Library at the Palais Bourbon and the Library at the Palais du Luxembourg. In 1843 he decorated the Church of St. Denis du Saint Sacrement with a large Pietà, and from 1848 to 1850 he painted the ceiling in the Galerie d'Apollon of the Louvre. From 1857 to 1861 he worked on frescoes for the Chapelle des Anges at the Church of Saint-Sulpice in Paris. They included "Jacob Wrestling with the Angel", "Saint Michael Slaying the Dragon", and "The Expulsion of Heliodorus from the Temple". These commissions offered him the opportunity to compose on a large scale in an architectural setting, much as had those masters he admired, Paolo Veronese, Tintoretto, and Rubens.

The work was fatiguing, and during these years he suffered from an increasingly fragile constitution. In addition to his home in Paris, from 1844 he also lived at a small cottage in Champrosay, where he found respite in the countryside. From 1834 until his death, he was faithfully cared for by his housekeeper, Jeanne-Marie le Guillou, who zealously guarded his privacy, and whose devotion prolonged his life and his ability to continue working in his later years.

In 1862 Delacroix participated in the creation of the Société Nationale des Beaux-Arts. His friend, the writer Théophile Gautier, became chairman, with the painter Aimé Millet acting as deputy chairman. In addition to Delacroix, the committee was composed of the painters Carrier-Belleuse and Puvis de Chavannes. Among the exhibitors were Léon Bonnat, Jean-Baptiste Carpeaux, Charles-François Daubigny, Gustave Doré, and Édouard Manet. Just after his death in 1863, the society organized a retrospective exhibition of 248 paintings and lithographs by Delacroix—and ceased to mount any further exhibitions.

The winter of 1862–63 was extremely rough for Delacroix; he was suffering from a severe throat infection that worsened over the course of the season. On a trip to Champrosay, he met a friend on the train and became exhausted after their conversation. On 1 June, he returned to Paris to see his doctor. Two weeks later, on 16 June, he was feeling better and returned to his country house. However, by 15 July, he was ill enough to see his doctor again, who said he could do nothing more for him. By then, the only food he could consume was fruit. Delacroix recognized the seriousness of his condition and wrote his will, leaving a gift for each of his friends. For his trusted housekeeper, Jenny Le Guillou, he left enough money for her to live on while instructing everything in his studio to be sold. He also included a clause forbidding any representation of his features, "whether by a death-mask or by drawing or by photography. I forbid it, expressly." On 13 August, Delacroix died, with Jenny by his side. He was buried in Père Lachaise Cemetery in Paris.

His country house survives at 11, rue Alphonse Daudet, Draveil.

== Legacy ==
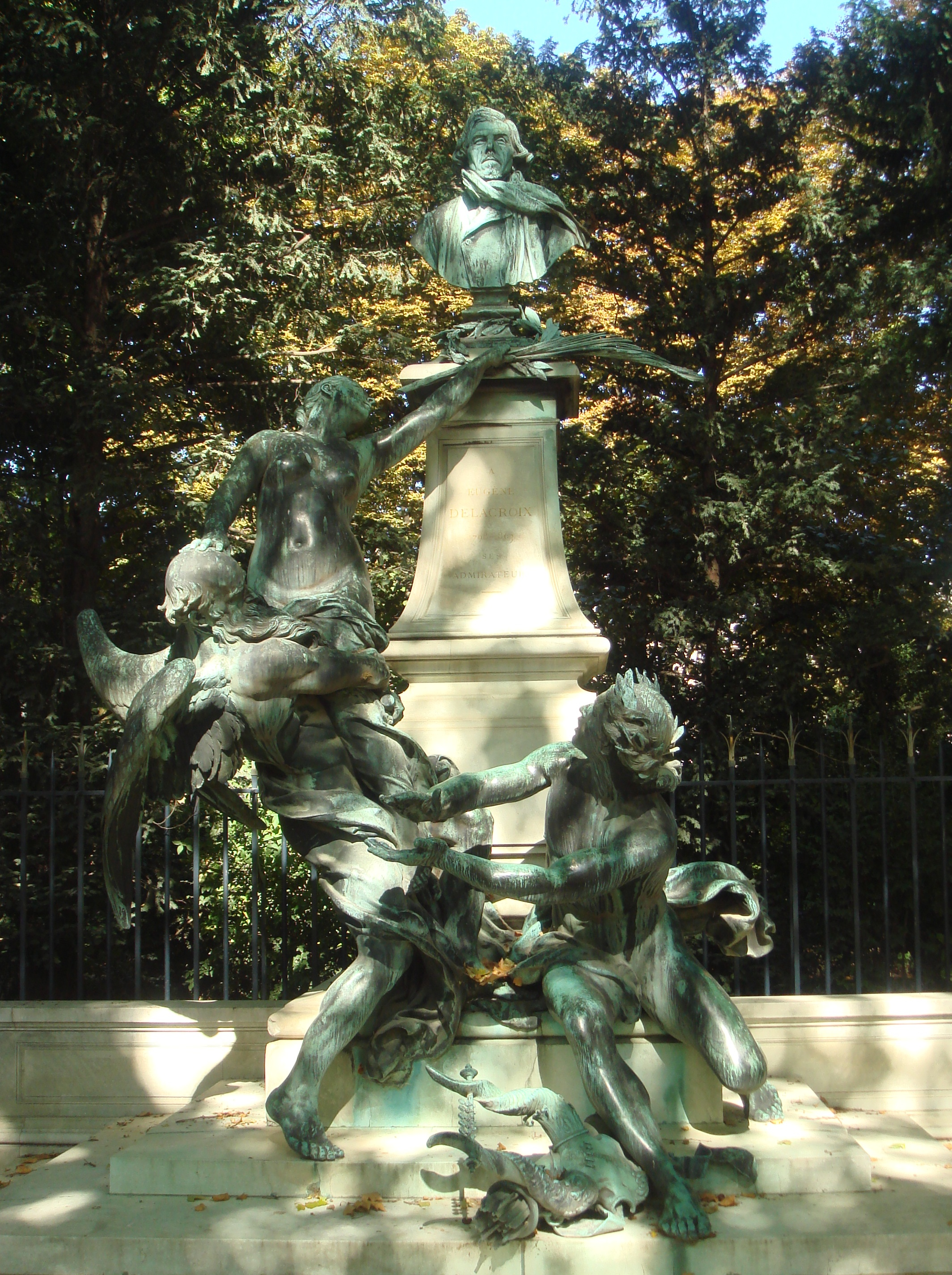
Monument to Delacroix, at the Jardin du Luxembourg

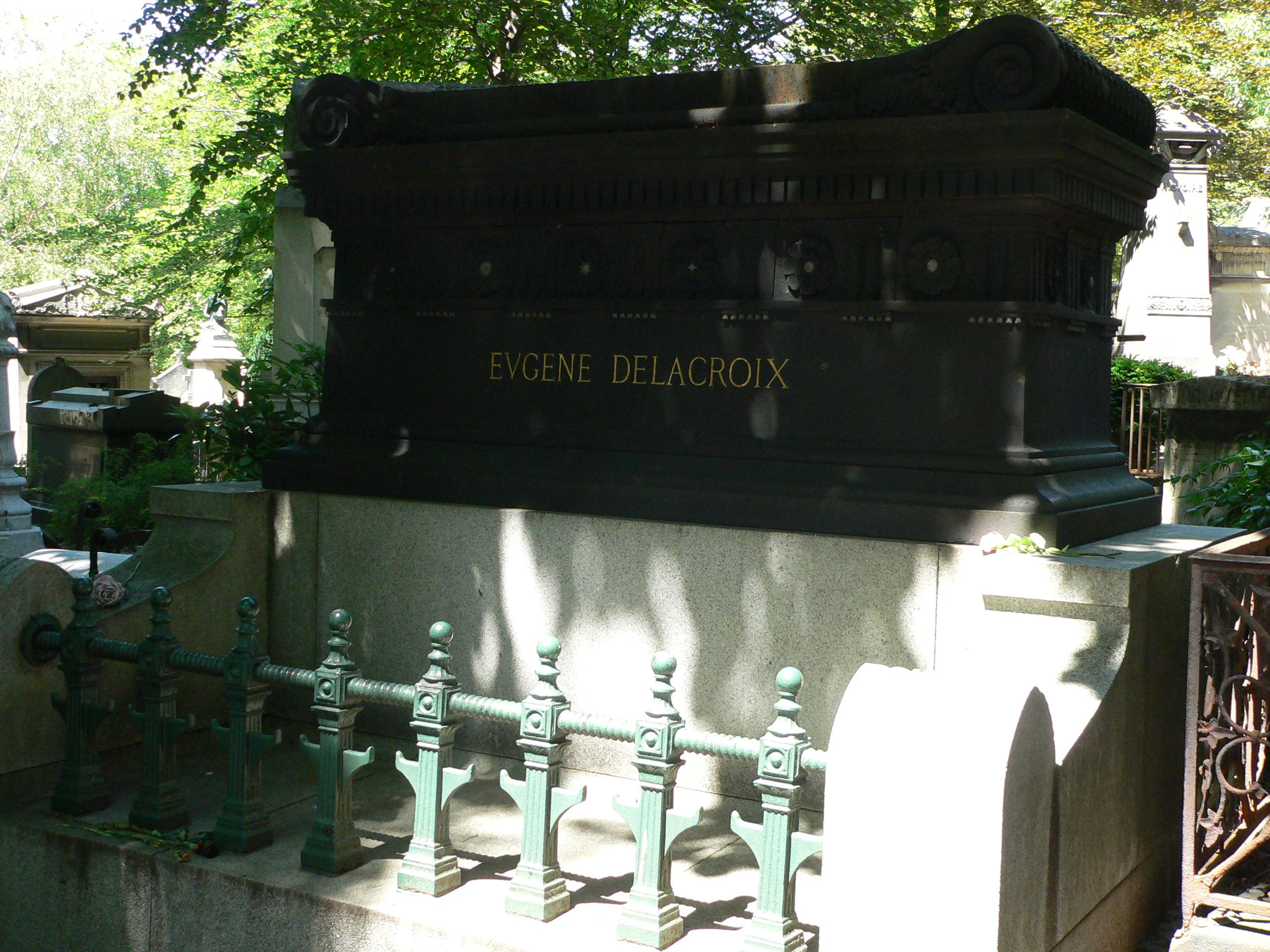
Delacroix 's tomb in Père Lachaise Cemetery

At the sale of his work in 1864, 9140 works were attributed to Delacroix, including 853 paintings, 1525 pastels and water colours, 6629 drawings, 109 lithographs, and over 60 sketch books. The number and quality of the drawings, whether done for constructive purposes or to capture a spontaneous movement, underscored his explanation, "Colour always occupies me, but drawing preoccupies me." Delacroix produced several fine self-portraits, and a number of memorable portraits which seem to have been done purely for pleasure, among which were the portrait of fellow artist Baron Schwiter, an inspired small oil of the violinist Niccolò Paganini, and Portrait of Frédéric Chopin and George Sand, a double portrait of his friends, the composer Frédéric Chopin and writer George Sand; the painting was cut after his death, but the individual portraits survive.

On occasion Delacroix painted pure landscapes (The Sea at Dieppe, 1852) and still lifes (Still Life with Lobsters, 1826–27), both of which feature the virtuoso execution of his figure-based works. He is also well known for his Journal, in which he gave eloquent expression to his thoughts on art and contemporary life.

A generation of impressionists was inspired by Delacroix's work. Renoir and Manet made copies of his paintings, and Degas purchased the portrait of Baron Schwiter for his private collection. His painting at the church of Saint-Sulpice has been called the "finest mural painting of his time".

Contemporary Chinese artist Yue Minjun has created his own interpretation of Delacroix's painting Massacre of Chios, which retains the same name. Yue Minjun's painting was itself sold at Sotheby's for nearly $4.1 million in 2007.

His pencil drawing Moorish Conversation on a Terrace was discovered as part of the Munich Art Hoard.

== Selected works ==
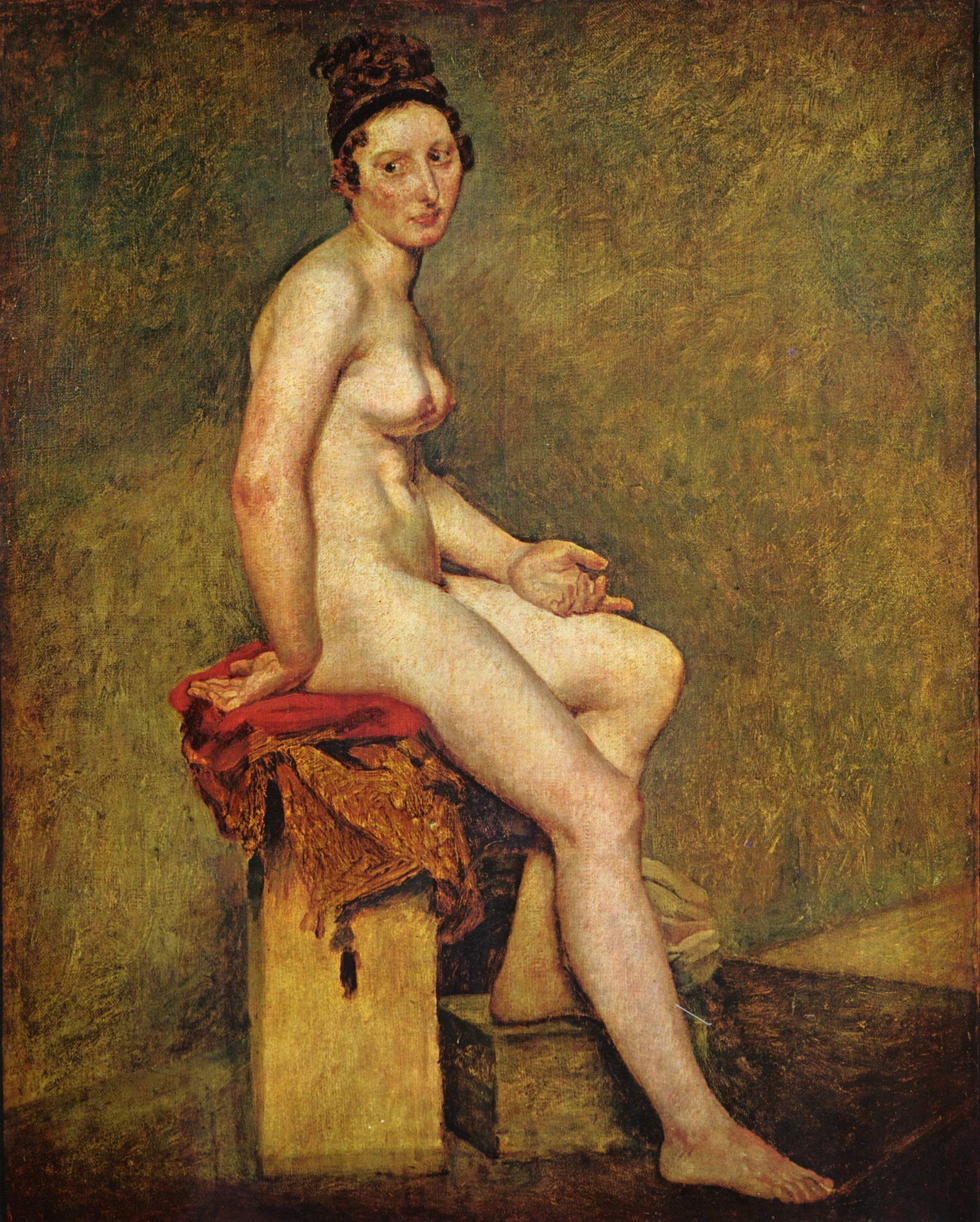
Mademoiselle Rose, 1817–1824, Louvre

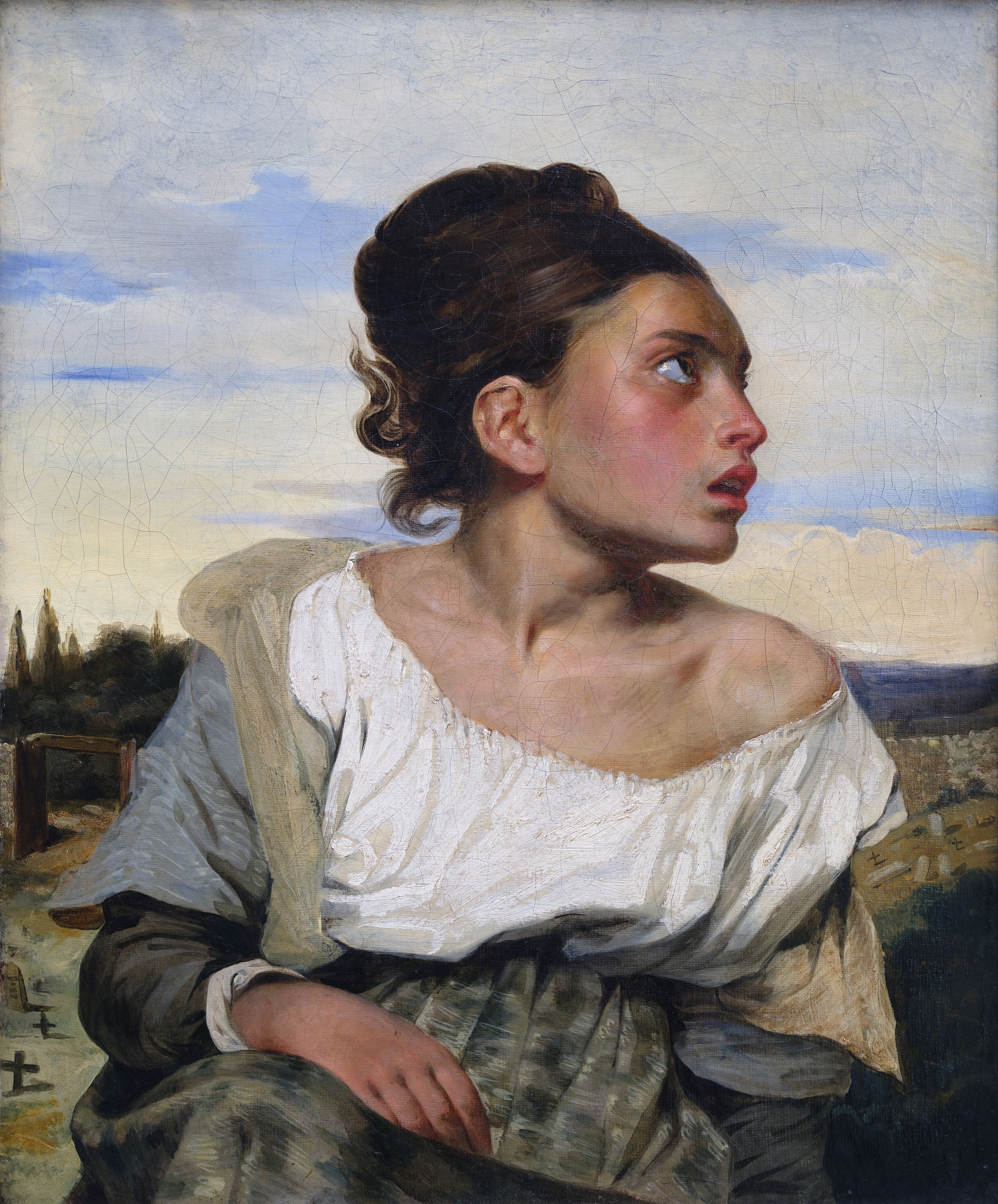
Orphan Girl at the Cemetery, 1823, Louvre

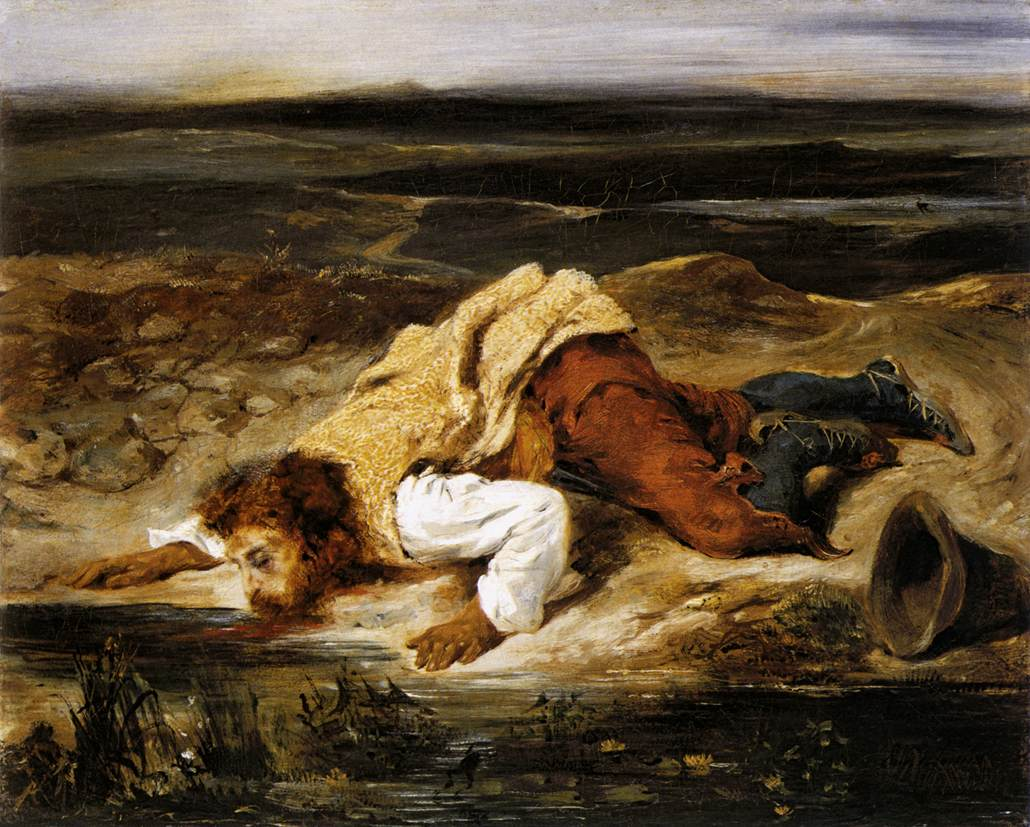
A Wounded Brigand Quenches his Thirst, 1825

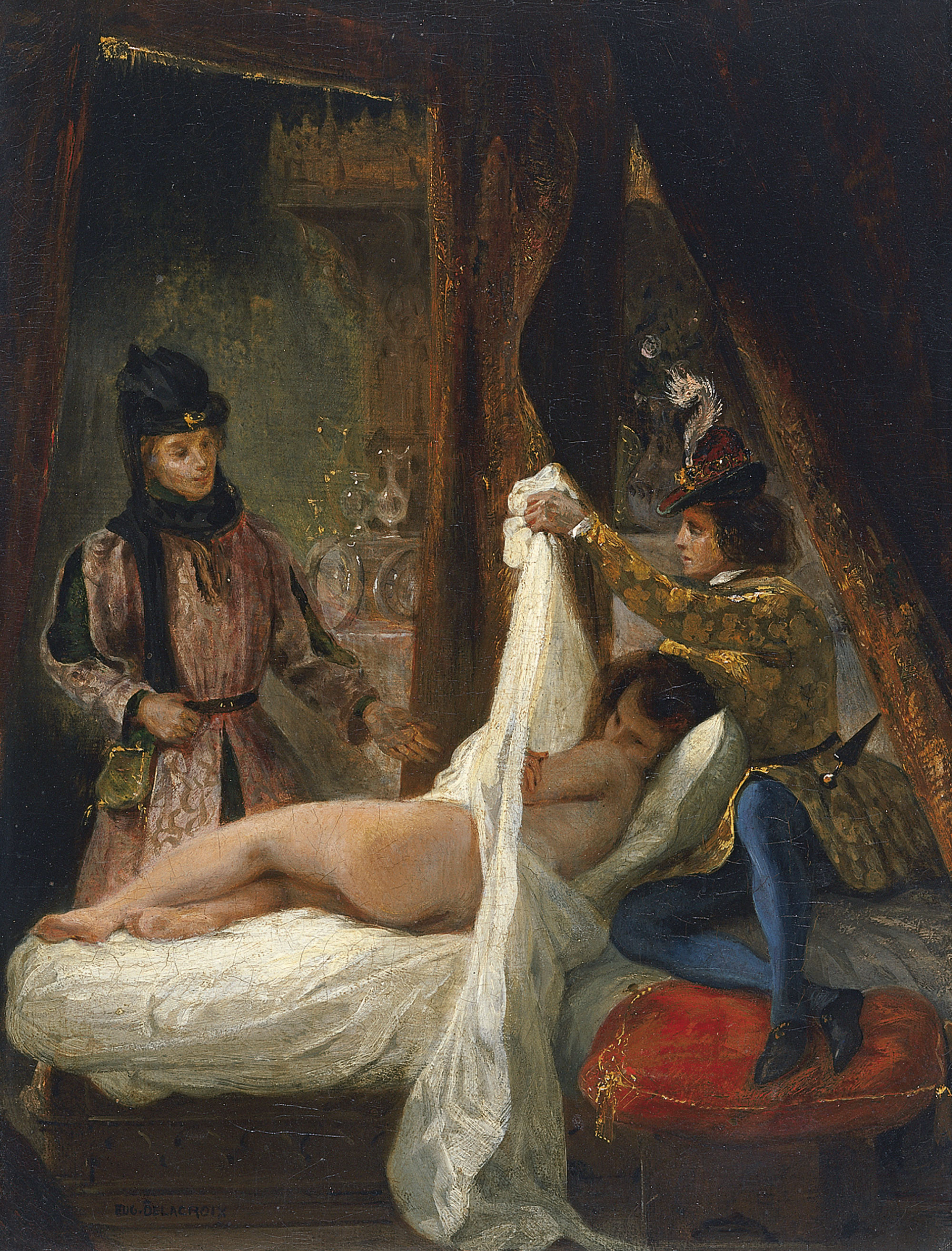
Louis of Orléans Unveiling his Mistress, c. 1825–26, Thyssen-Bornemisza Collection

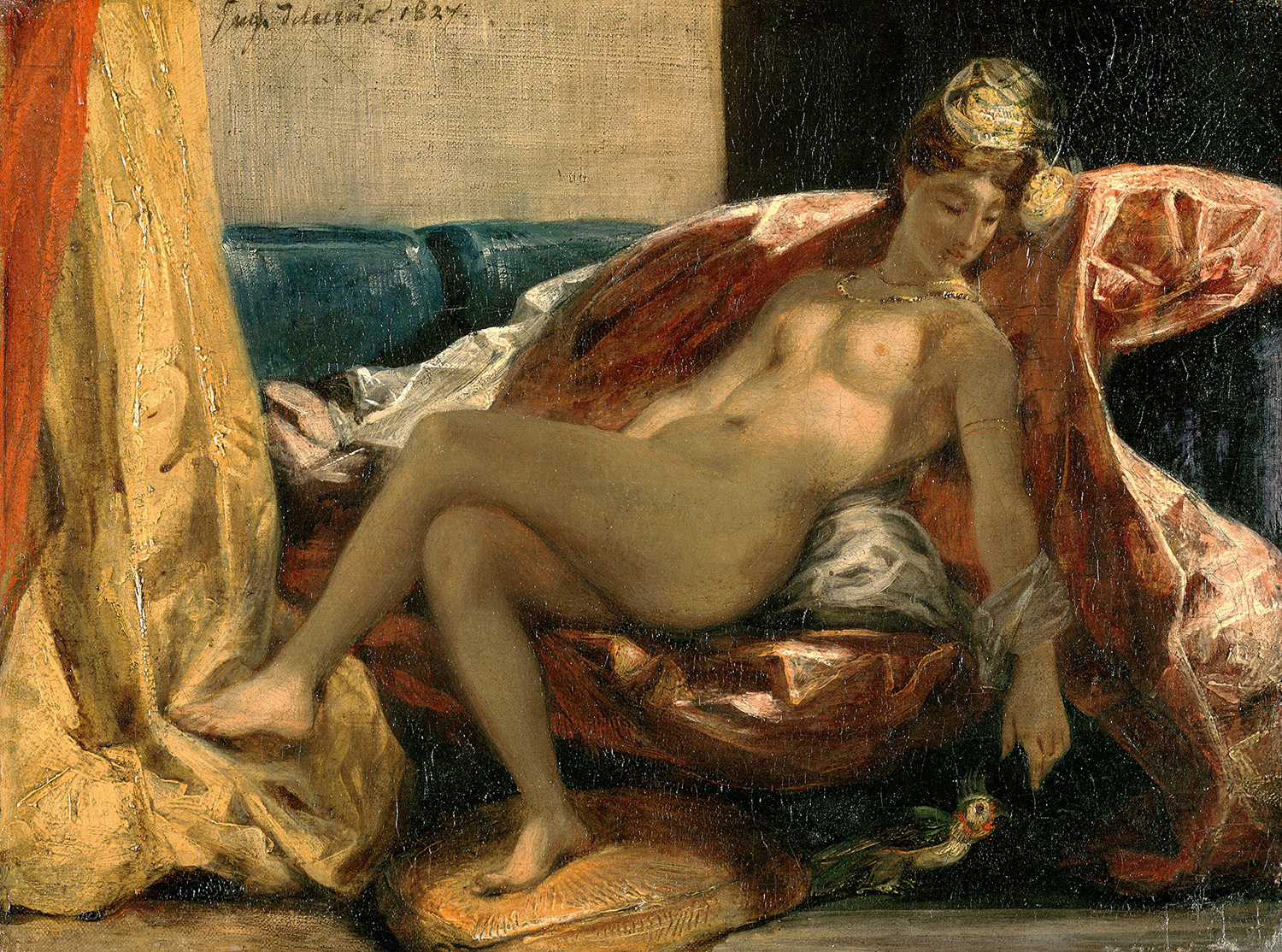
Woman Stroking a Parrot, 1827, Museum of Fine Arts of Lyon

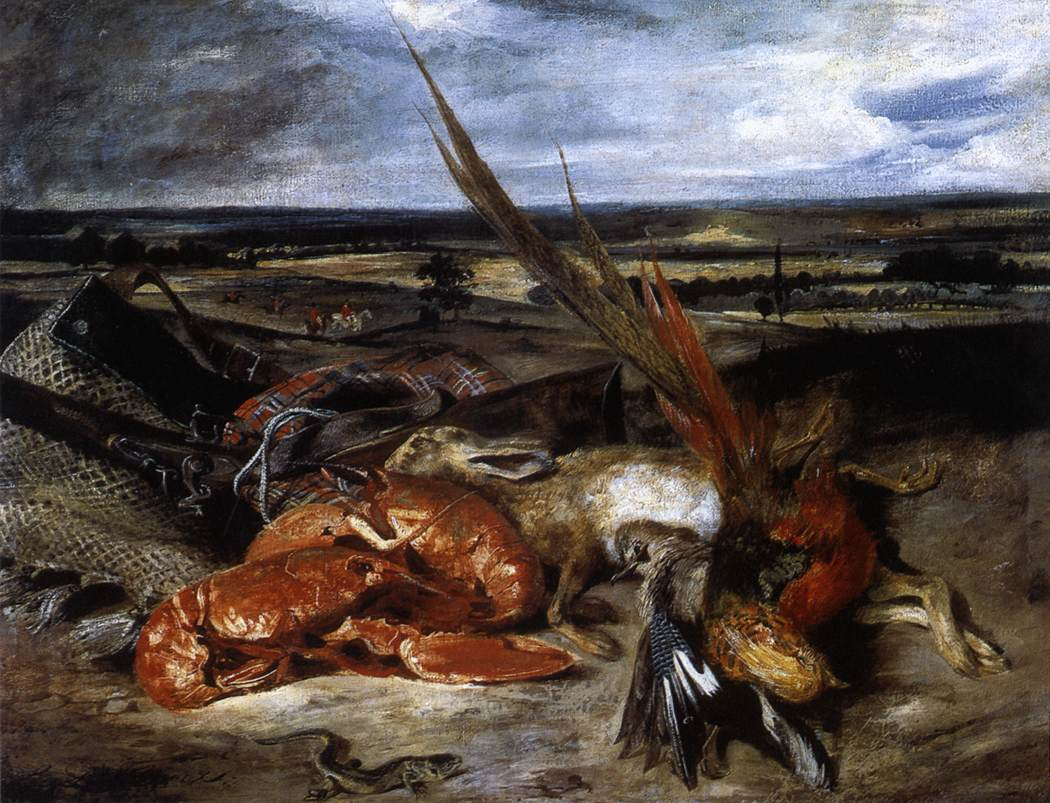
Still Life with Lobsters, 1827, Louvre

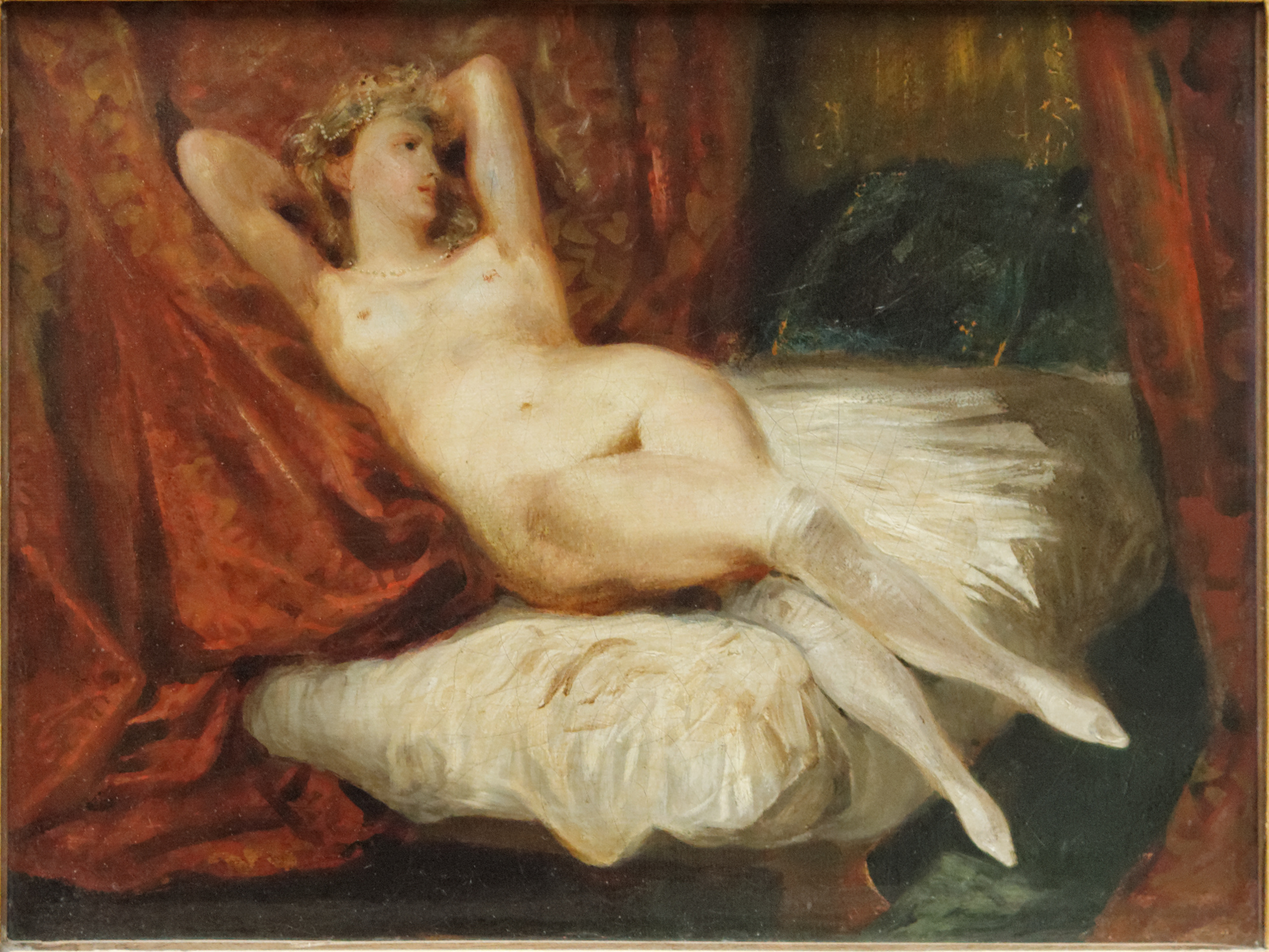
Woman With White Socks, 1825–1830, Louvre

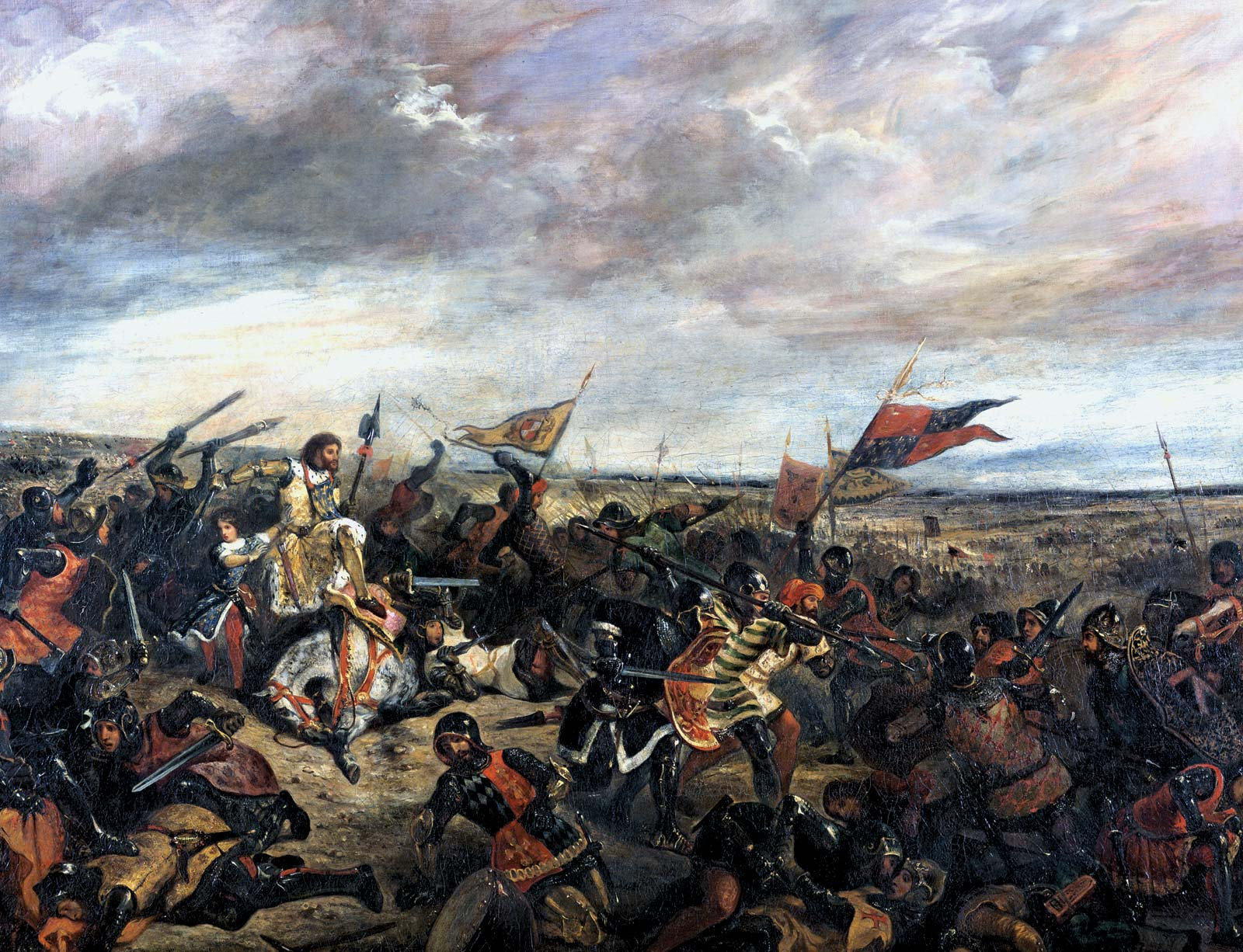
The Battle of Poitiers, 1830, Louvre

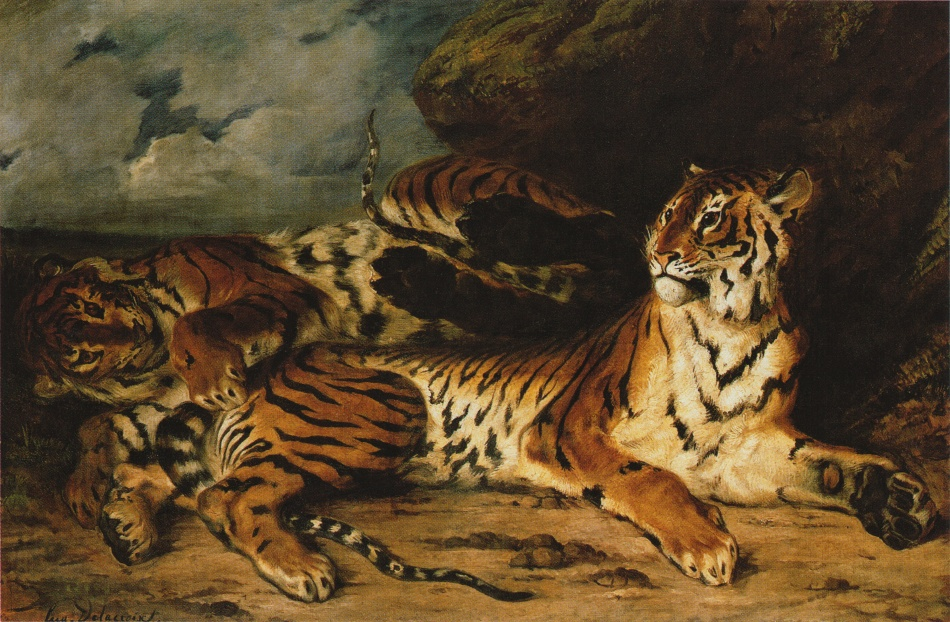
A Young Tiger Playing with its Mother, 1830, Louvre

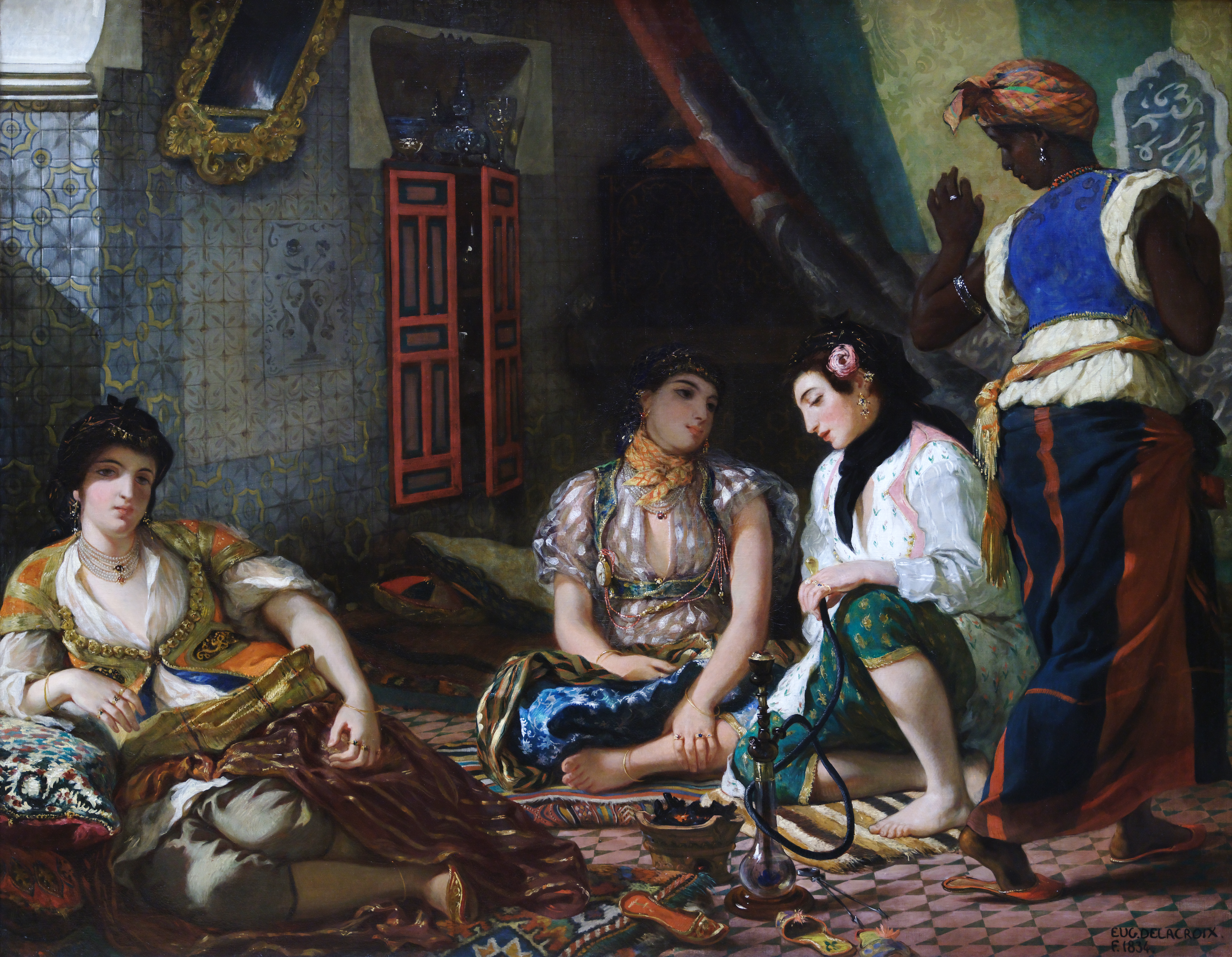
The Women of Algiers, 1834, Louvre

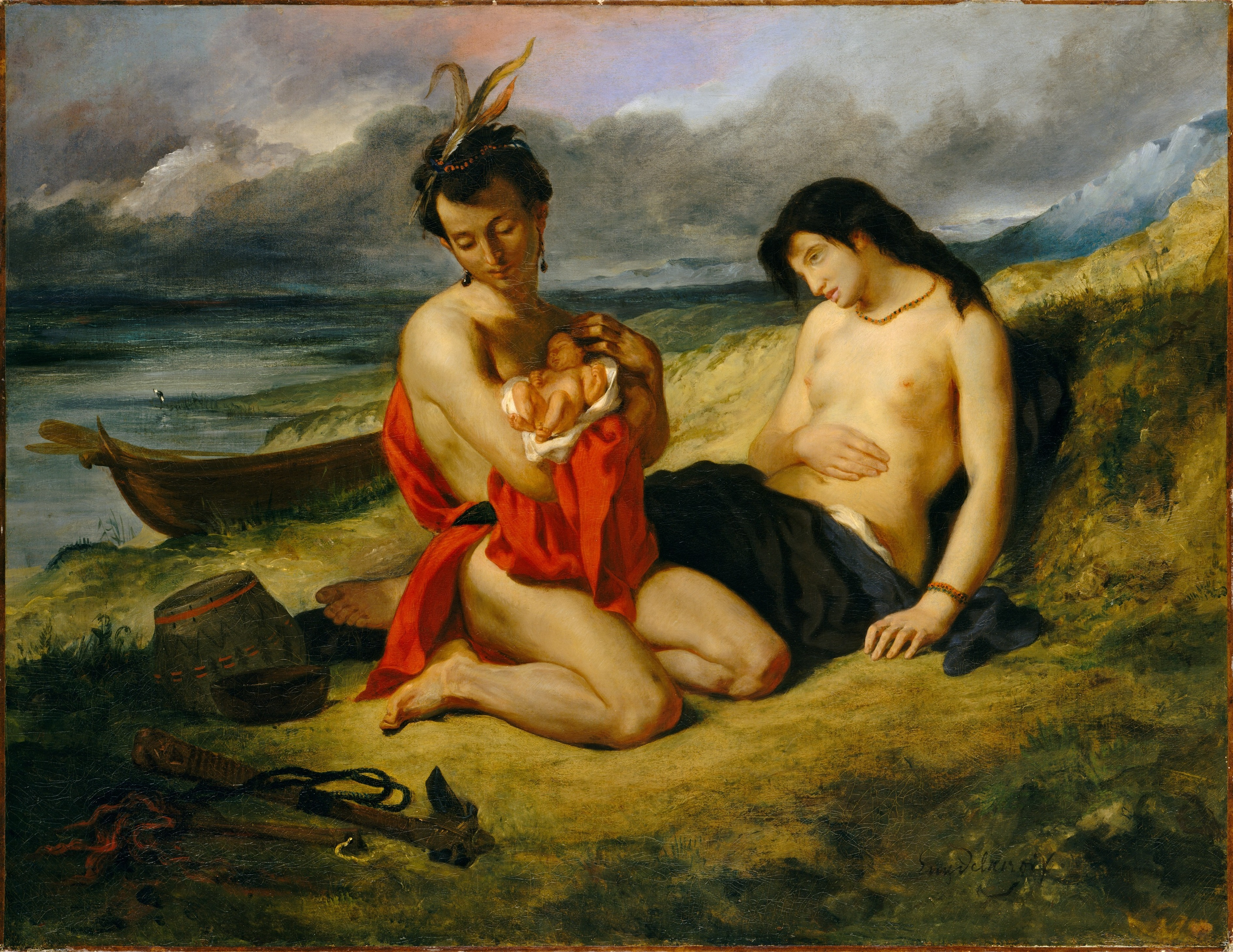
The Natchez, 1835, Metropolitan Museum of Art

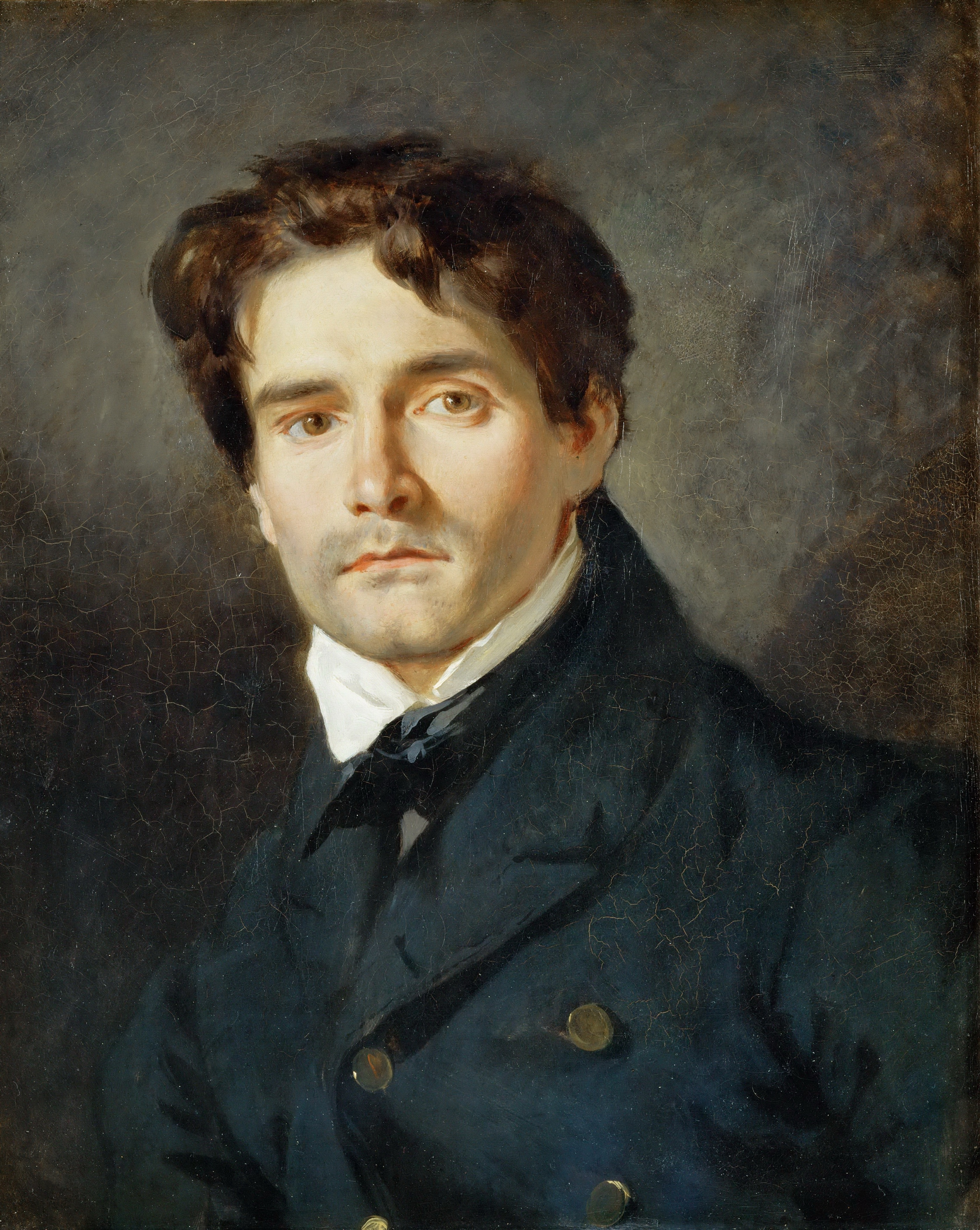
Portrait of Léon Riesener, 1835, Louvre

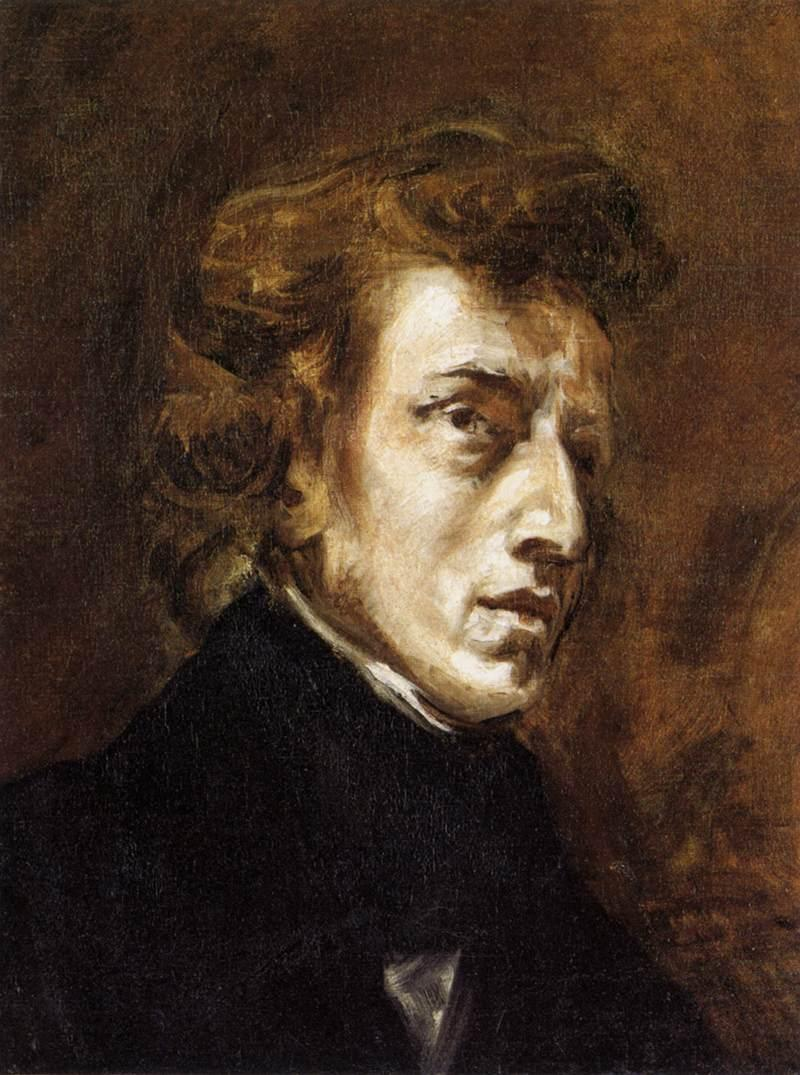
Frédéric Chopin, 1838, Louvre

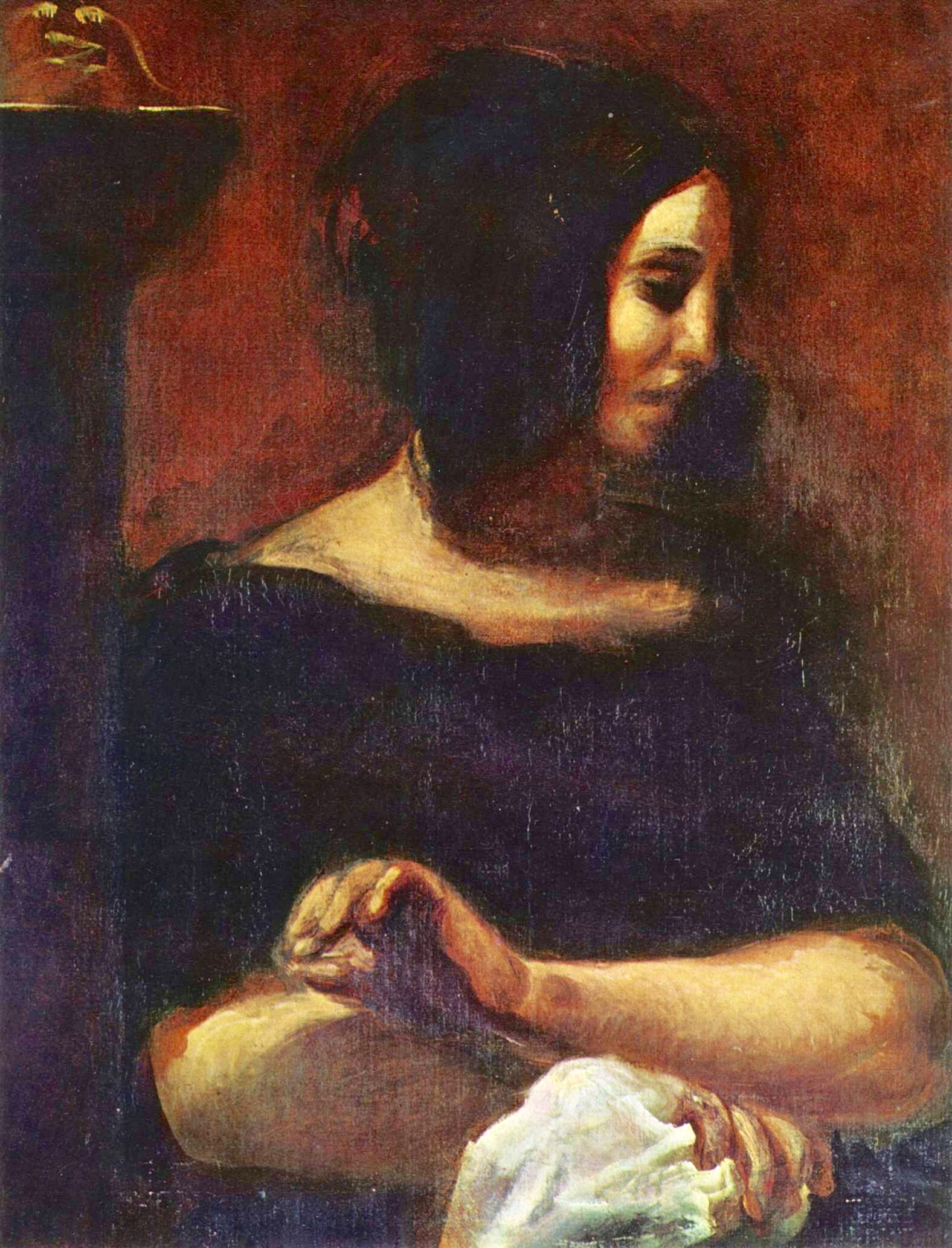
George Sand, 1838, Ordrupgaard-Museum

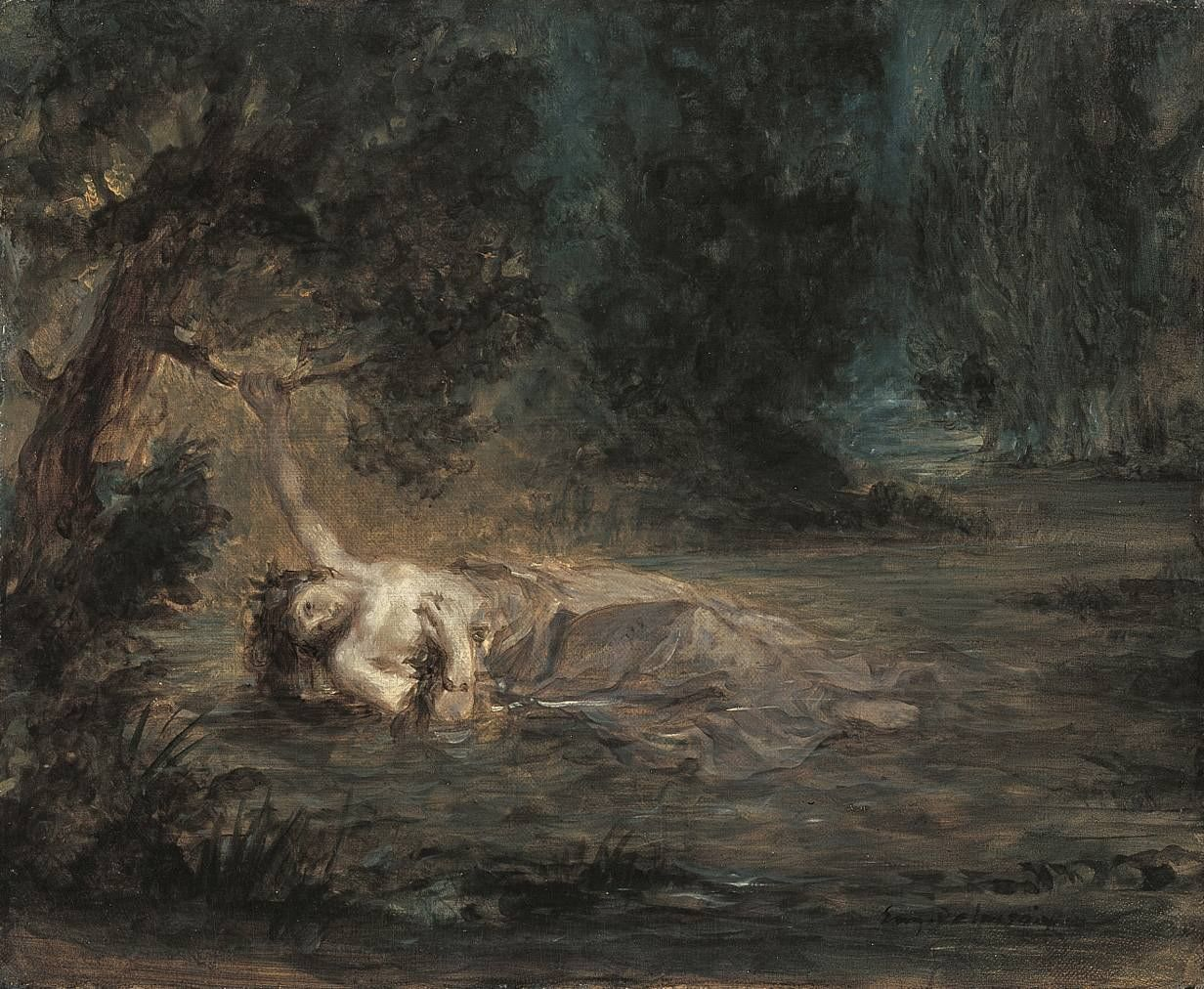
The Death of Ophelia, 1838, Neue Pinakothek

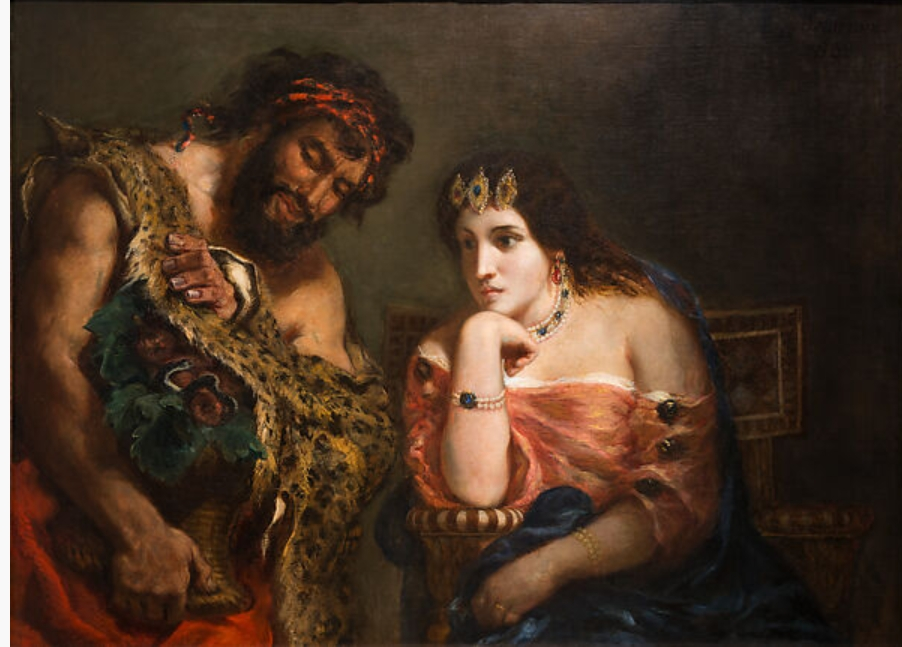
Cleopatra and the Peasant, 1838, Ackland Art Museum

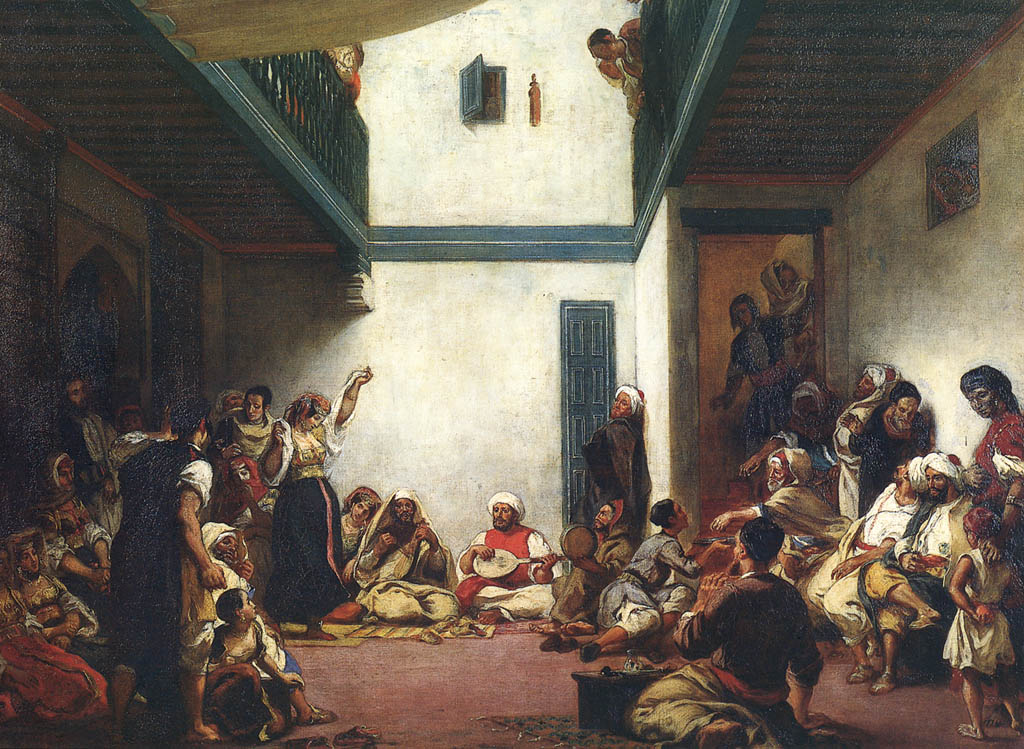
Jewish Wedding in Morocco, c. 1839, Louvre

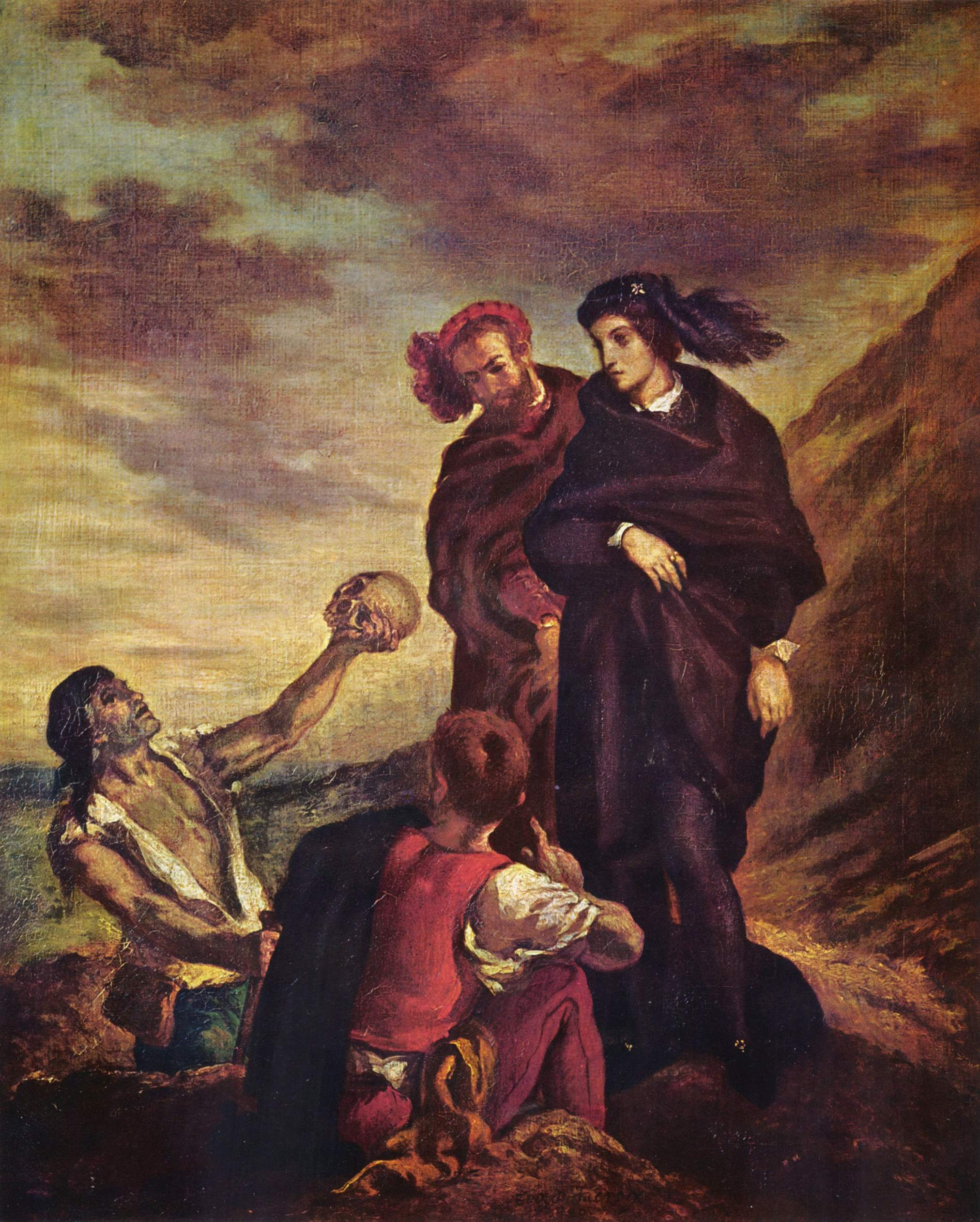
Hamlet and Horatio in the Graveyard, 1839, Louvre

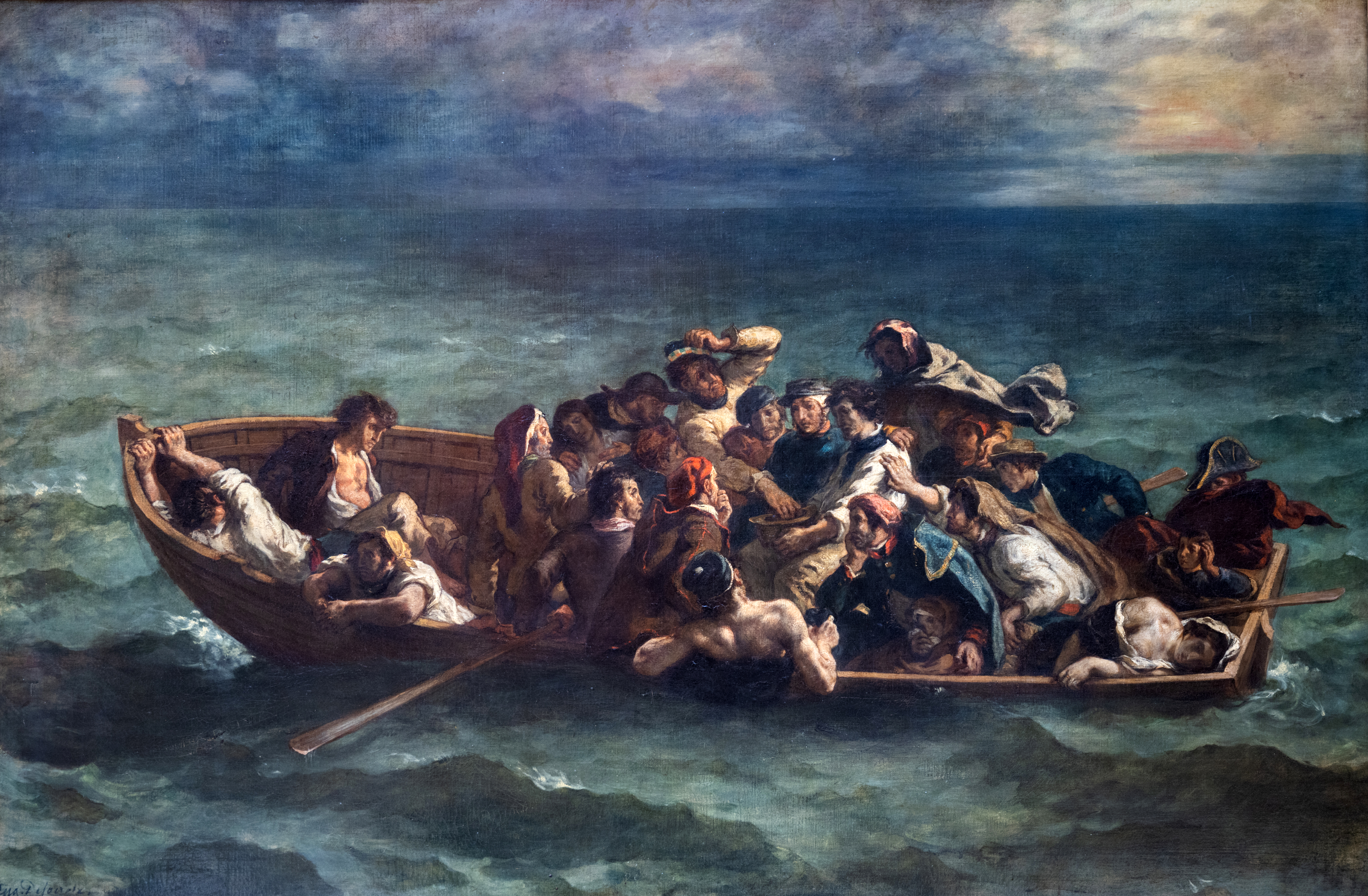
The Shipwreck of Don Juan, 1840, Louvre

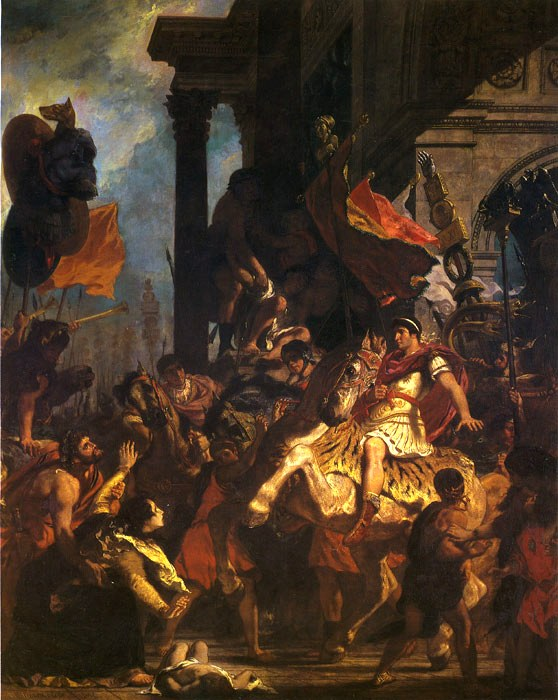
The Justice of Trajan, 1840, Musée des Beaux-Arts de Rouen

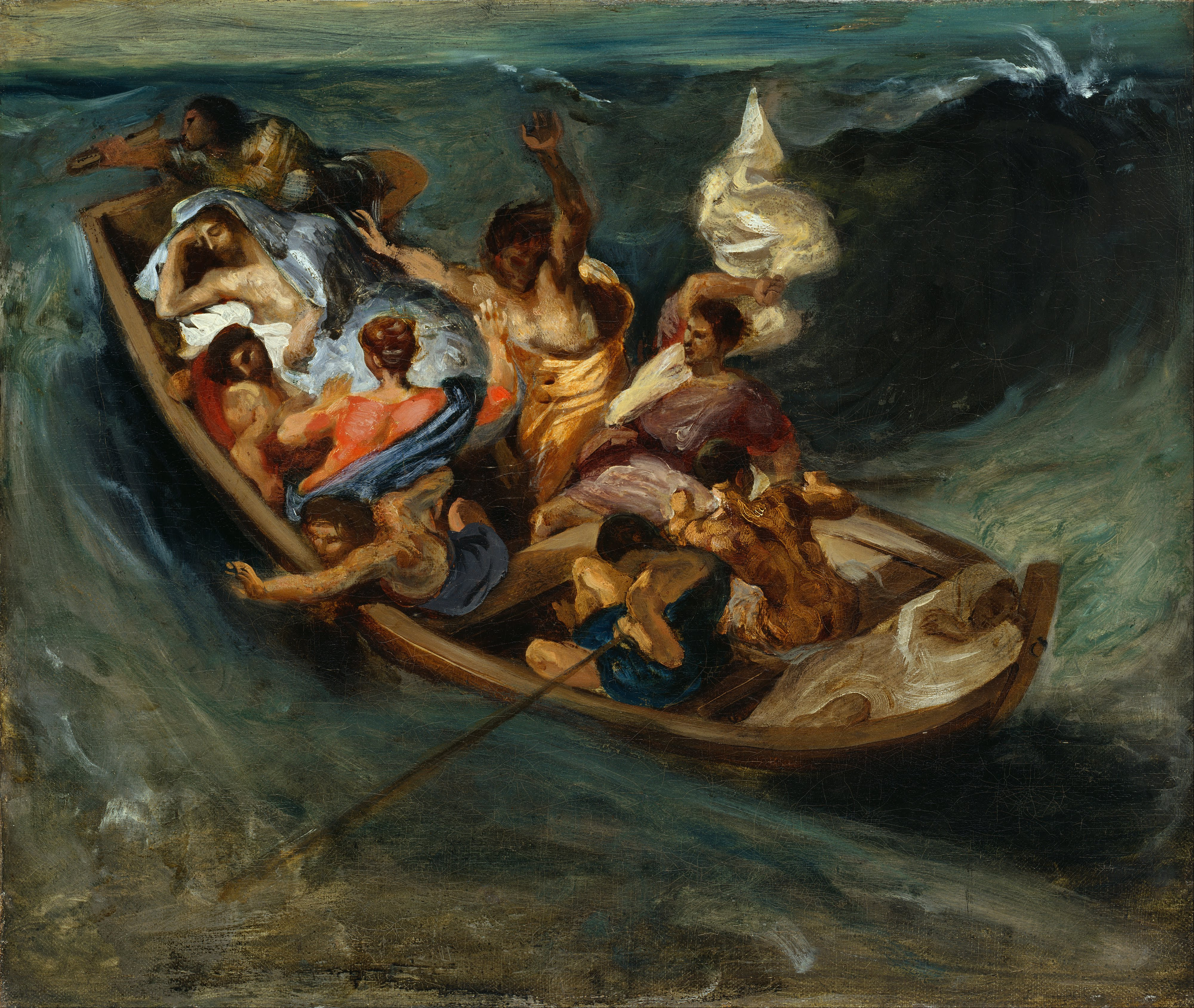
Christ on the Sea of Galilee, 1841, Nelson-Atkins Museum of Art

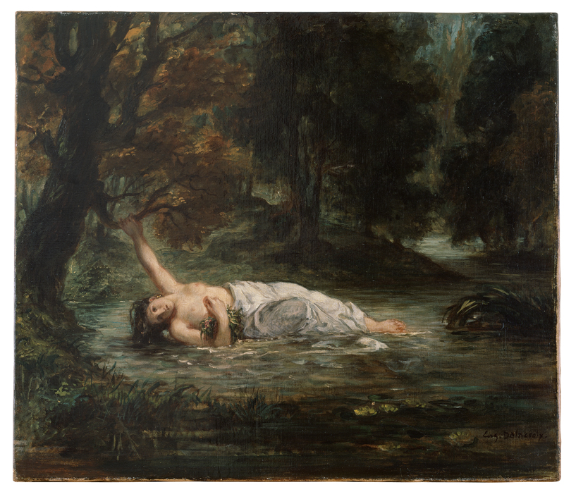
The Death of Ophelia, 1844, Reinhart Collection

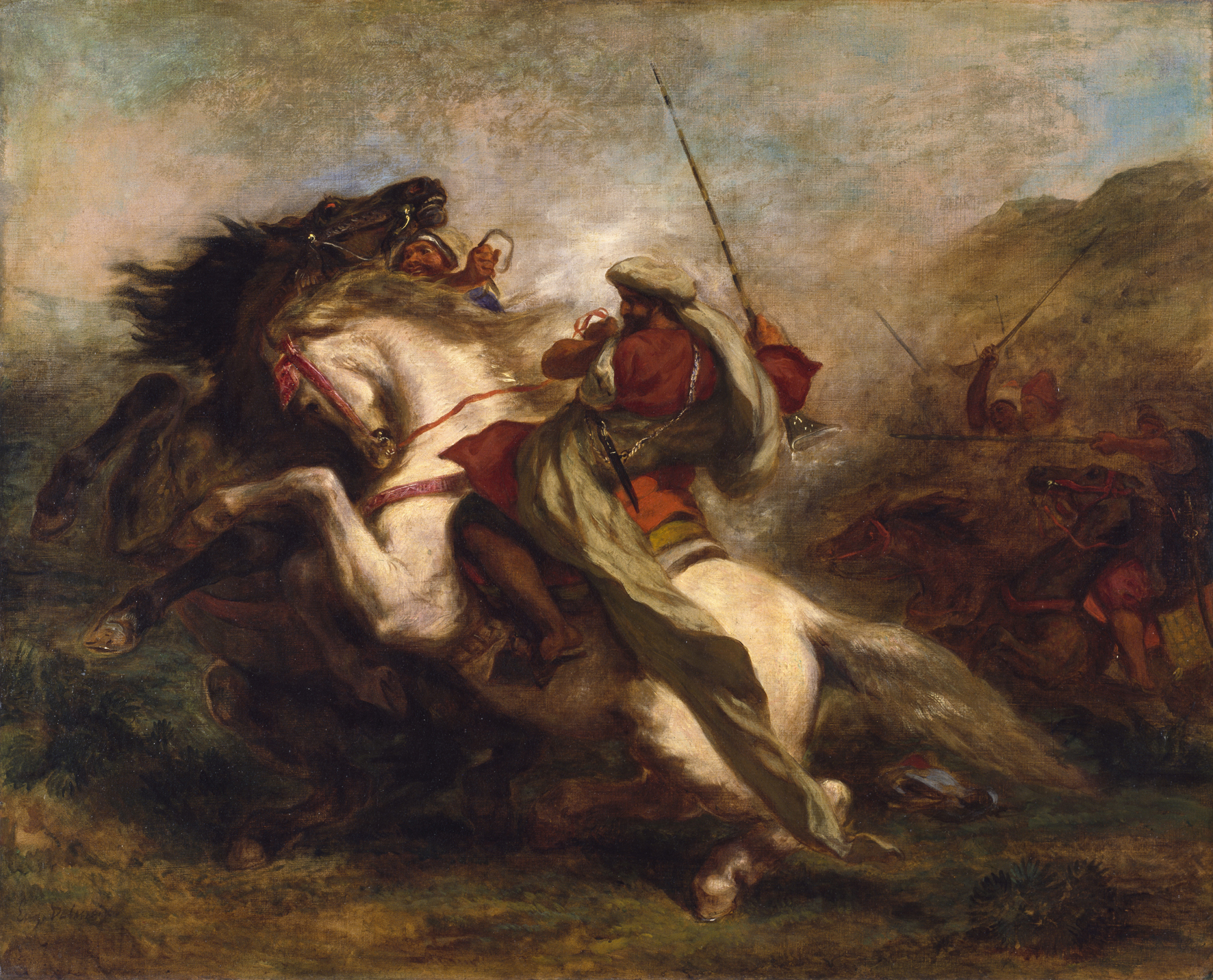
Collision of Moorish Horsemen, 1844, Walters Art Museum

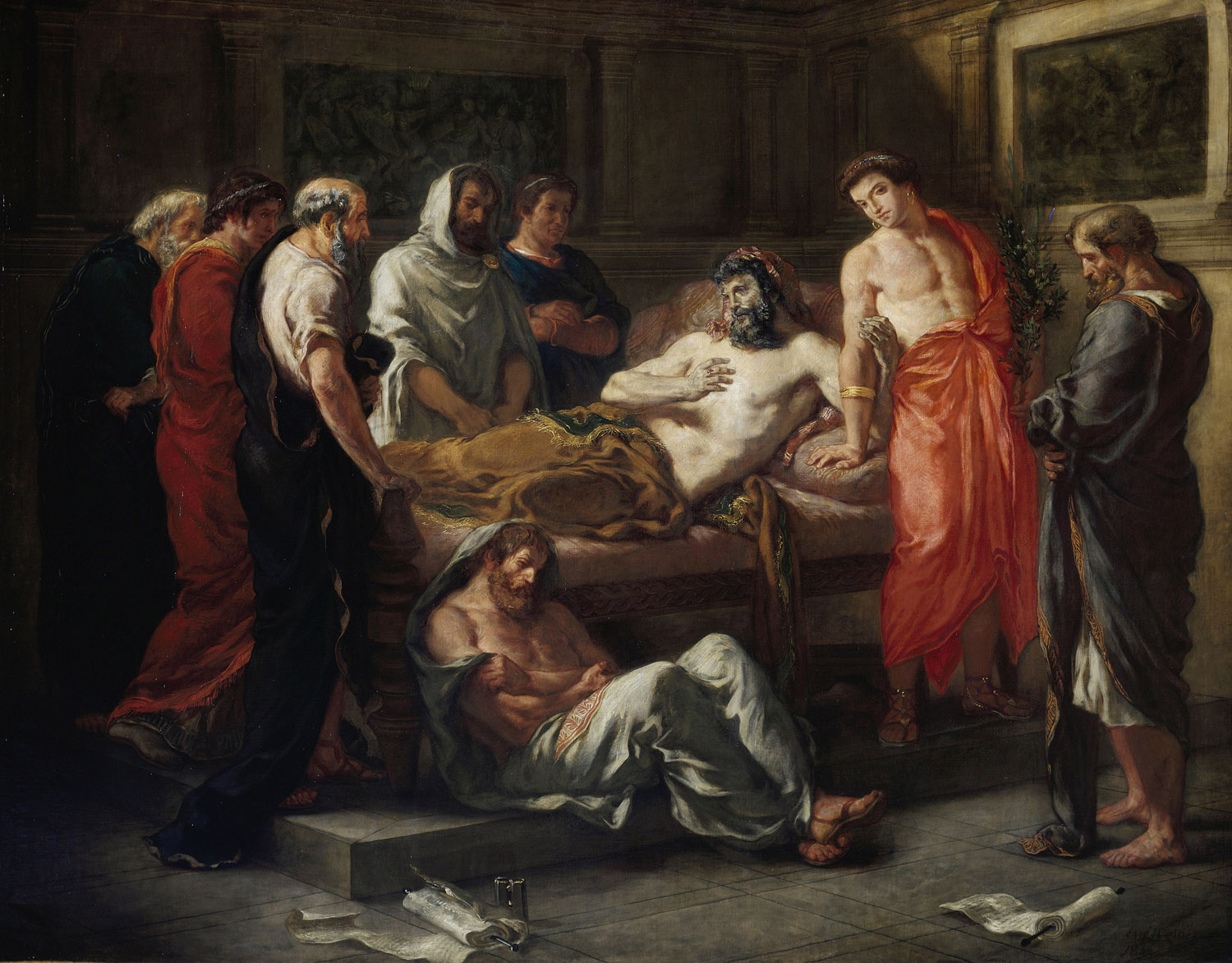
Last Words of the Emperor Marcus Aurelius, 1844, Musée des Beaux-Arts de Lyon

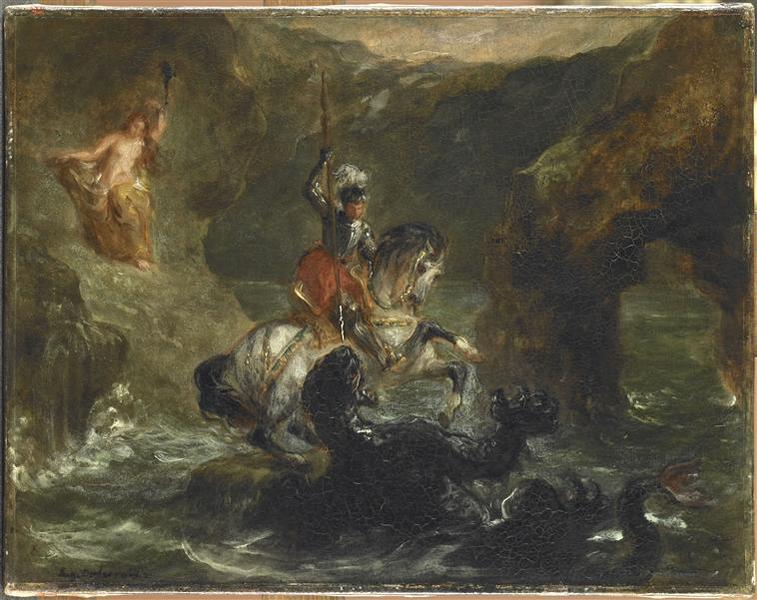
Saint George Fighting the Dragon, 1847, Louvre Museum

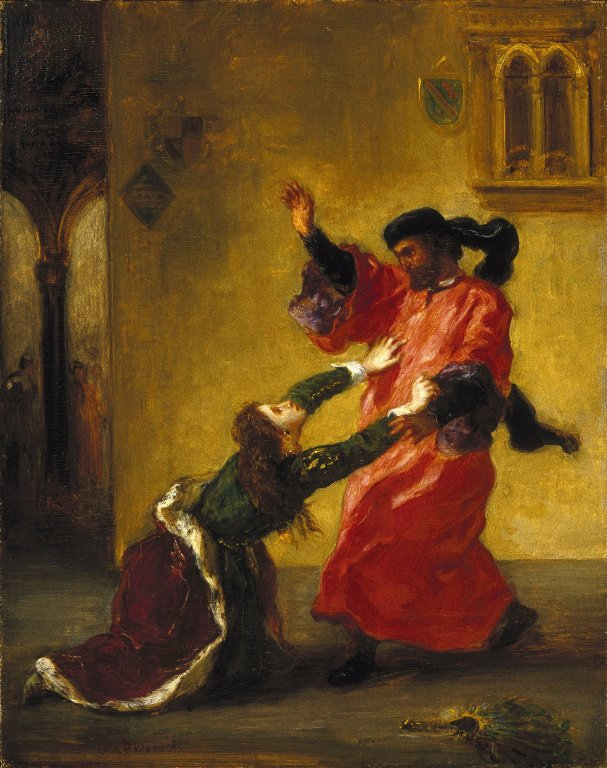
Desdemona Cursed by her Father (Desdemona maudite par son père), c.1850–1854, Brooklyn Museum

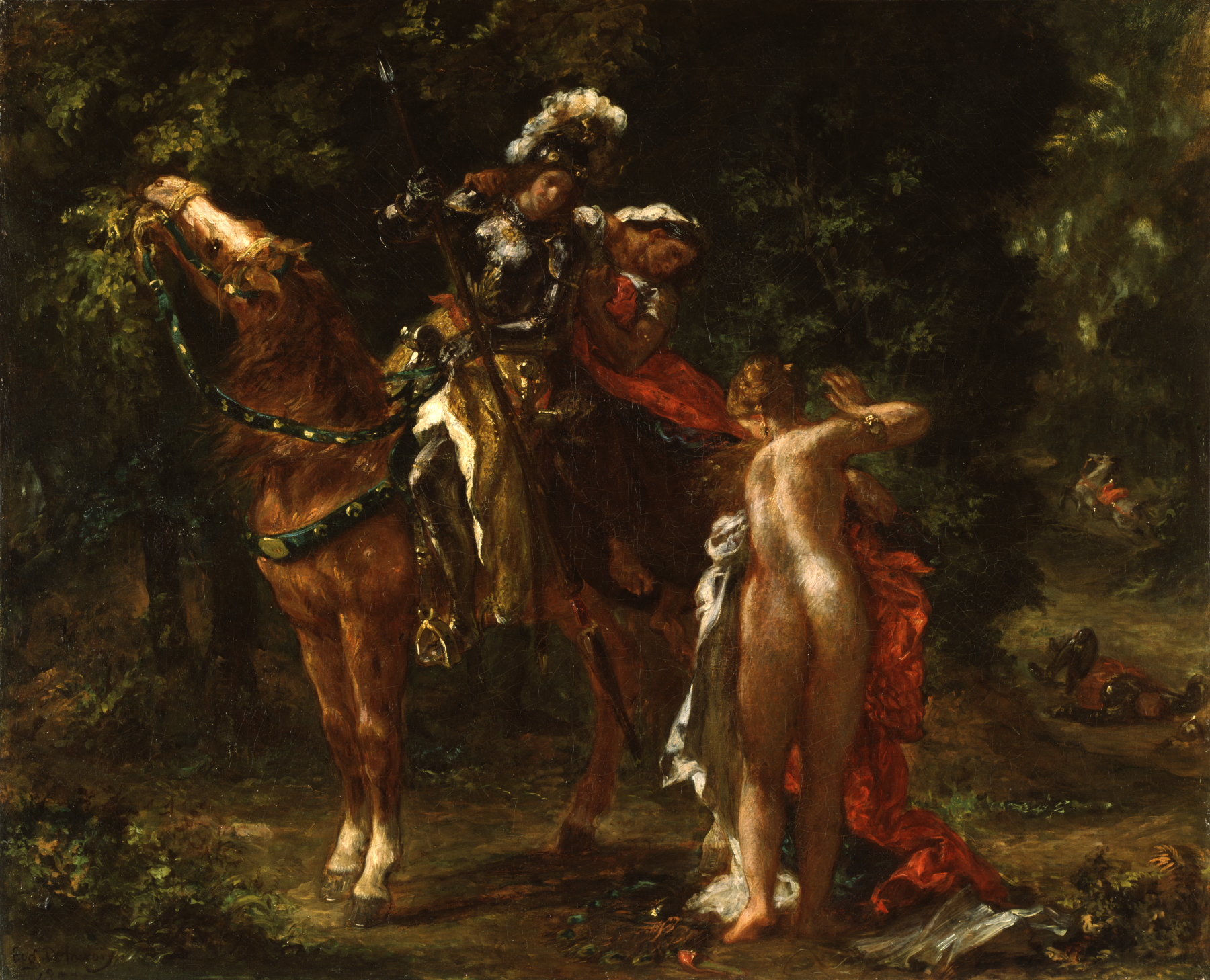
Marphise, 1852

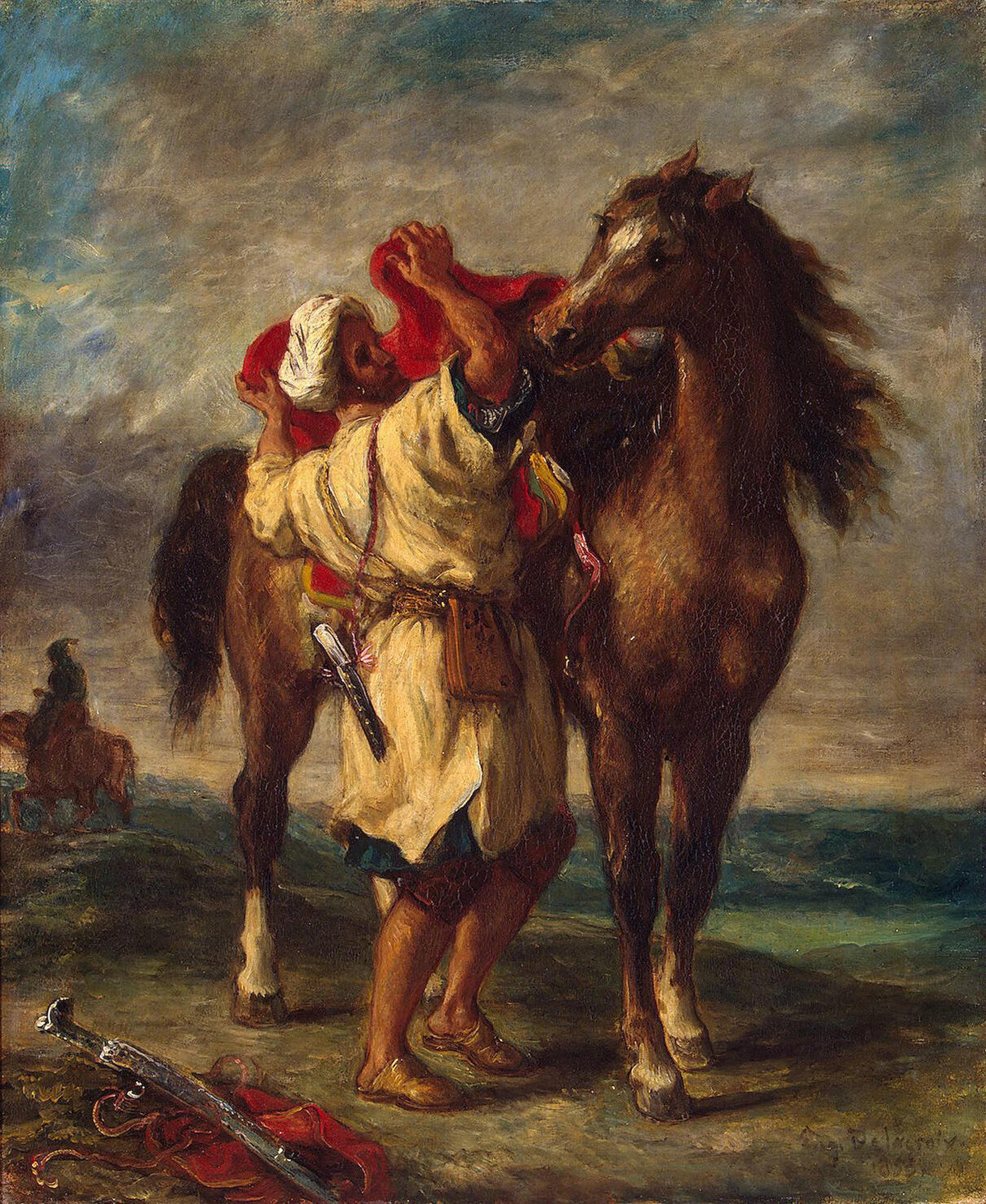
Moroccan Saddles His Horse, 1855, Hermitage Museum

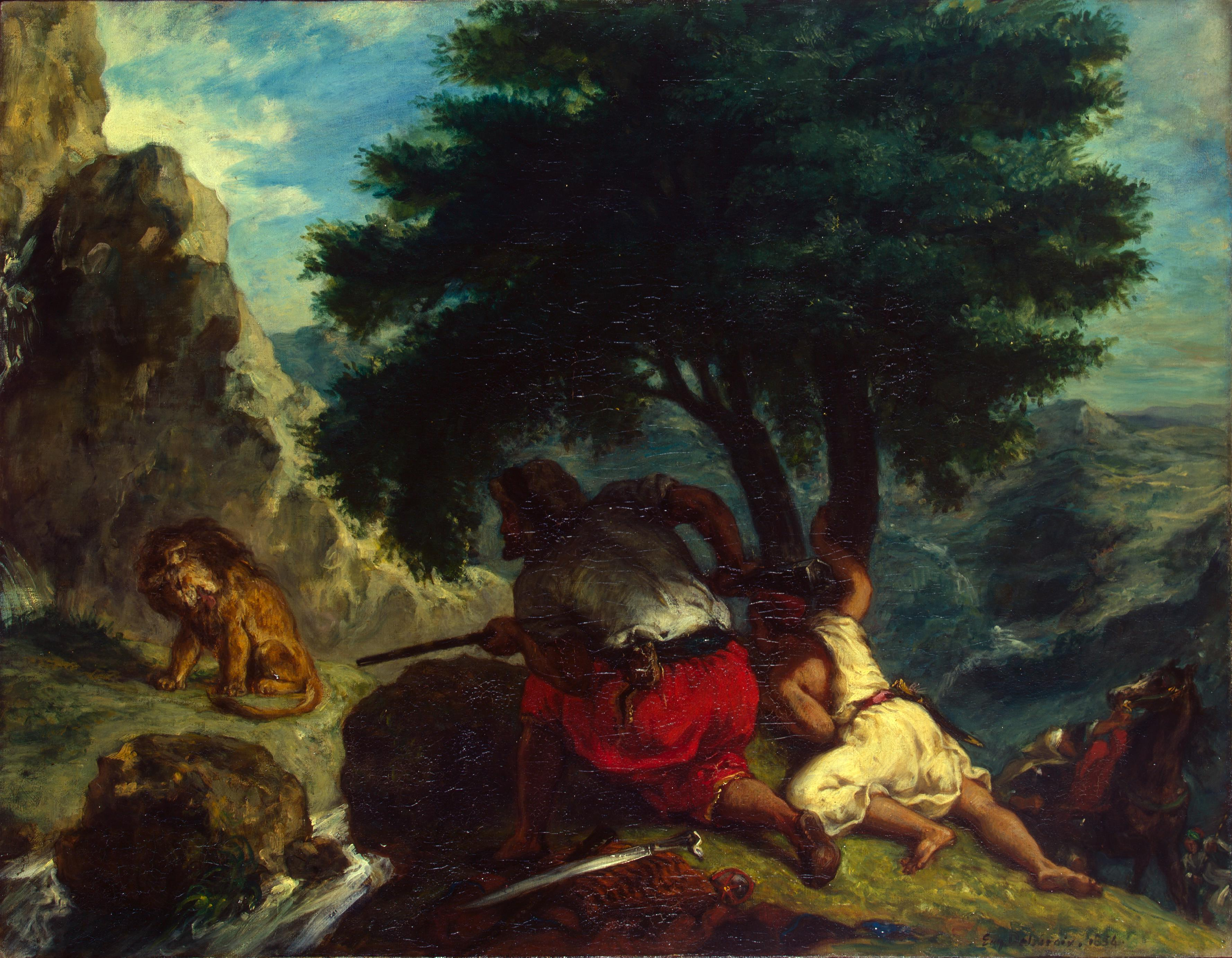
Lion Hunt in Morocco, 1855, Hermitage Museum

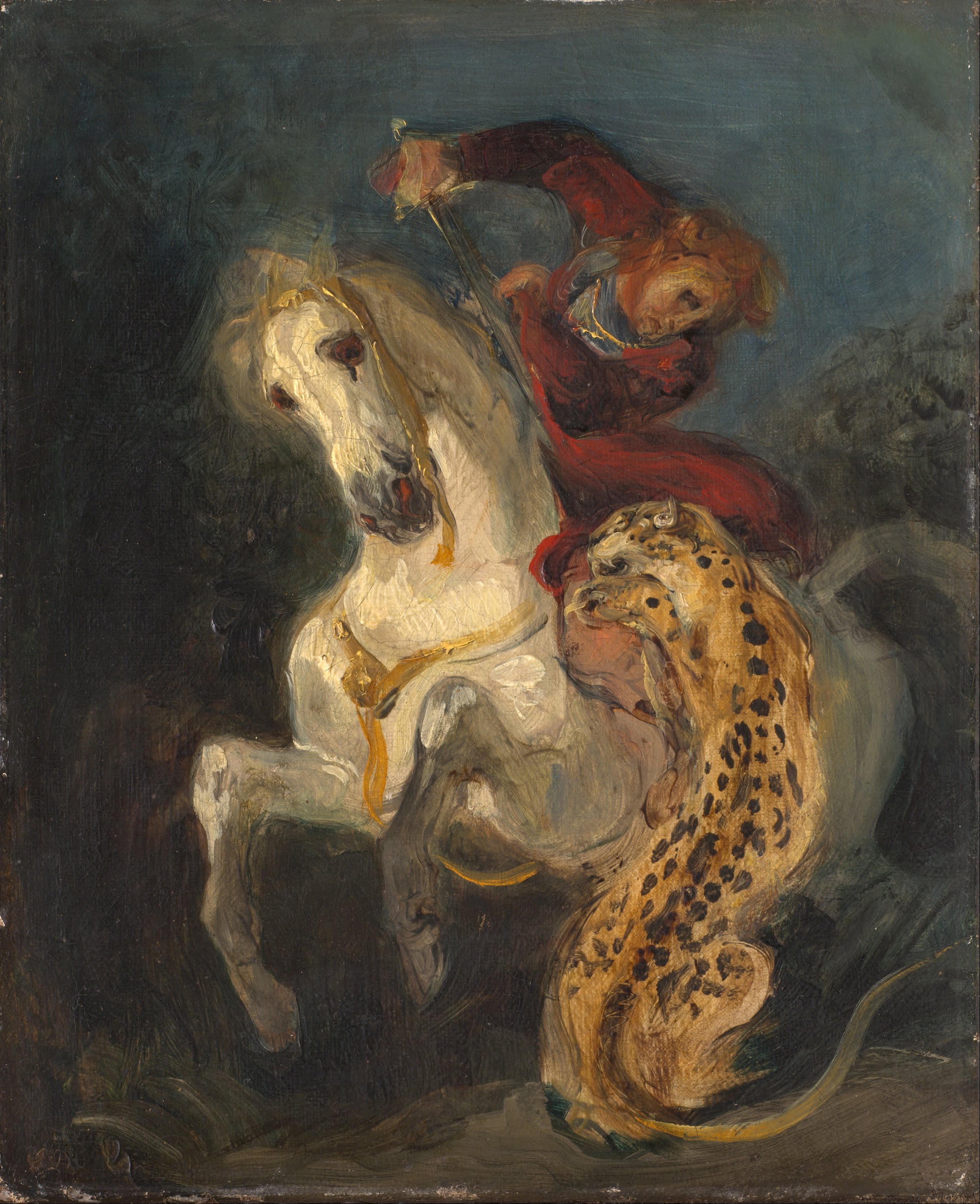
Rider Attacked by a Jaguar, 1855. National Gallery in Prague

The Bride of Abydos, 1857, Louvre

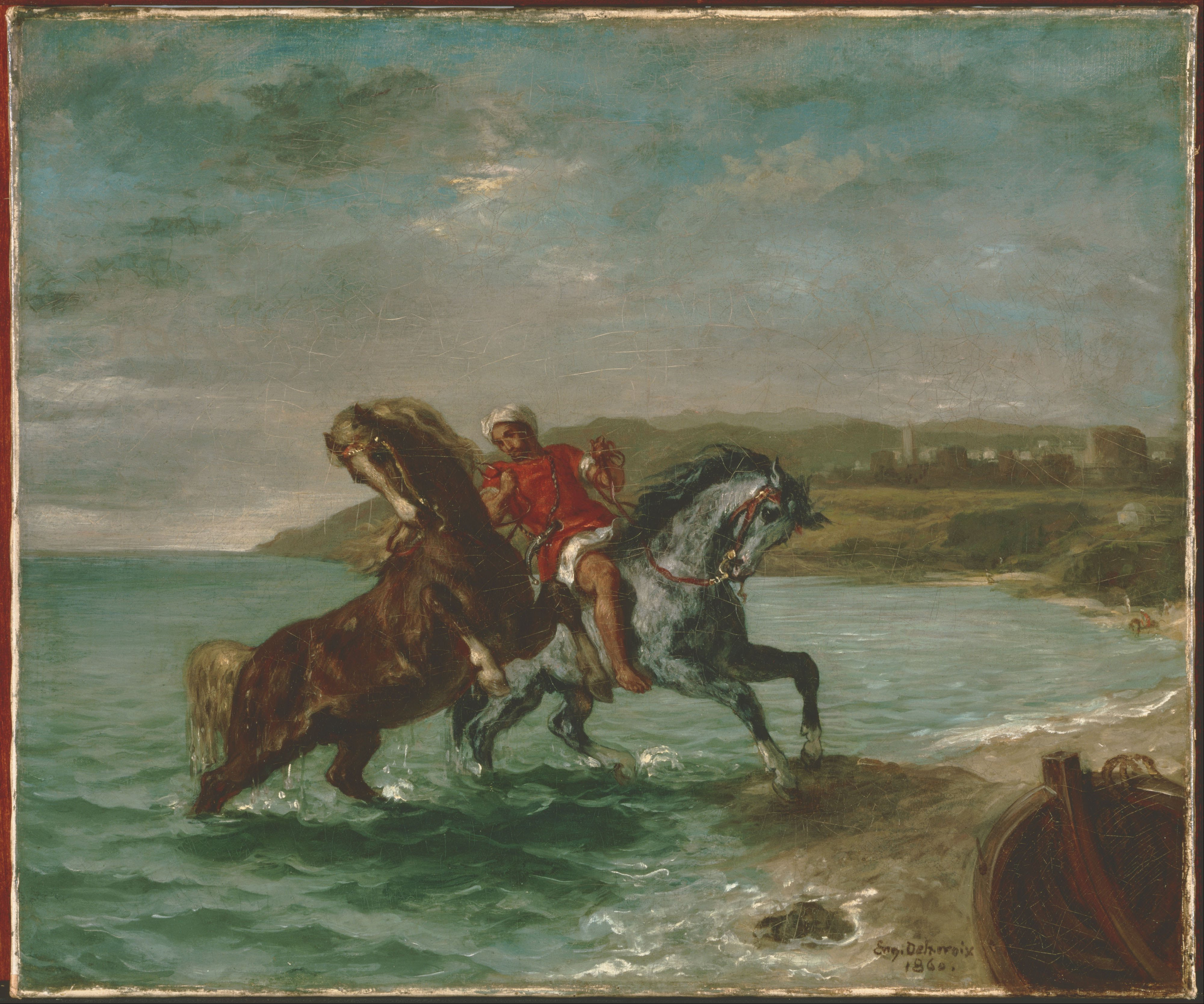
Horses Leaving the Sea, 1860, The Phillips Collection

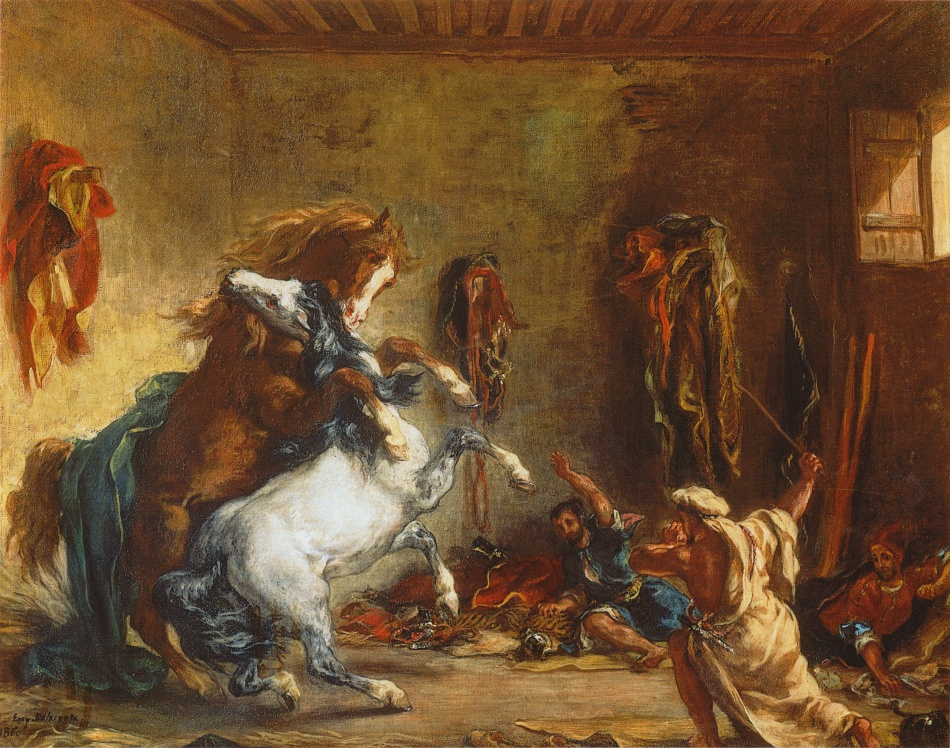
Arab Horses Fighting in a Stable, 1860

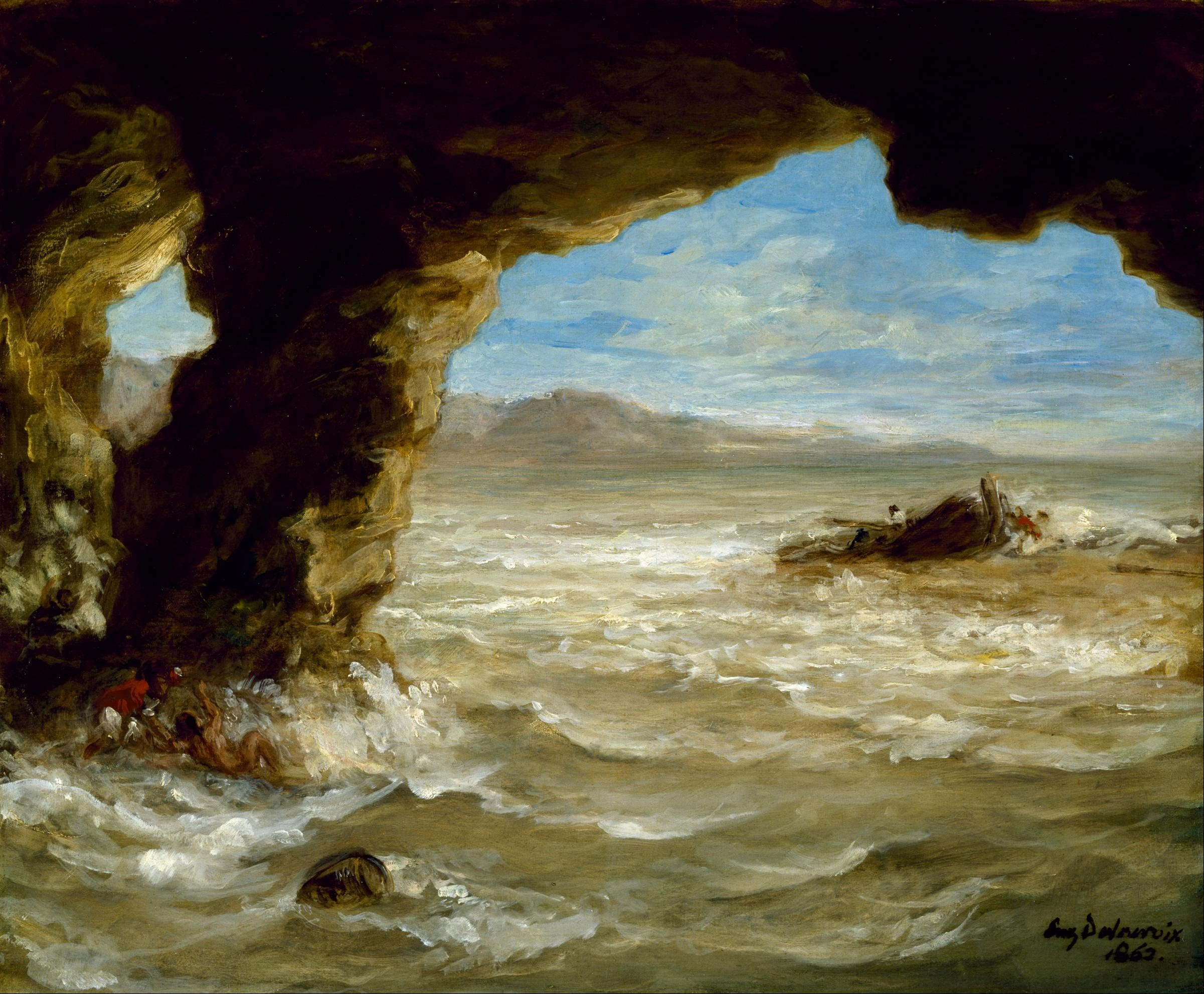
Shipwreck on the Coast, 1862, Museum of Fine Arts, Houston

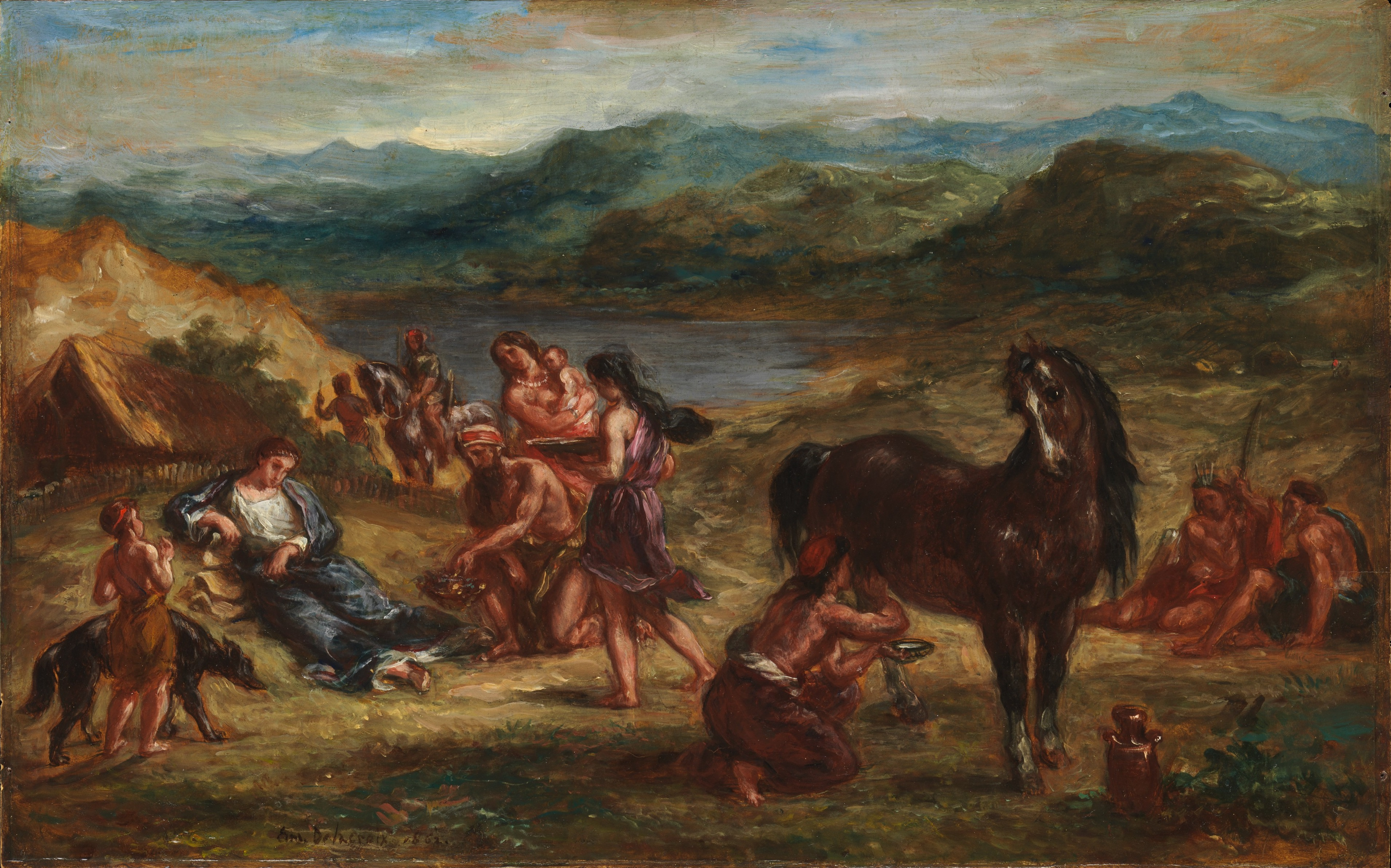
Ovid among the Scythians, 1862, version in Metropolitan Museum of Art

== See also ==
- Jean Louis Marie Eugène Durieu, friend and photographer
- Orientalism
- Musée national Eugène Delacroix, his last apartment in Paris
