= Cabinet of General Cavaignac =

French cabinet of 1848

- France; Cabinet of France
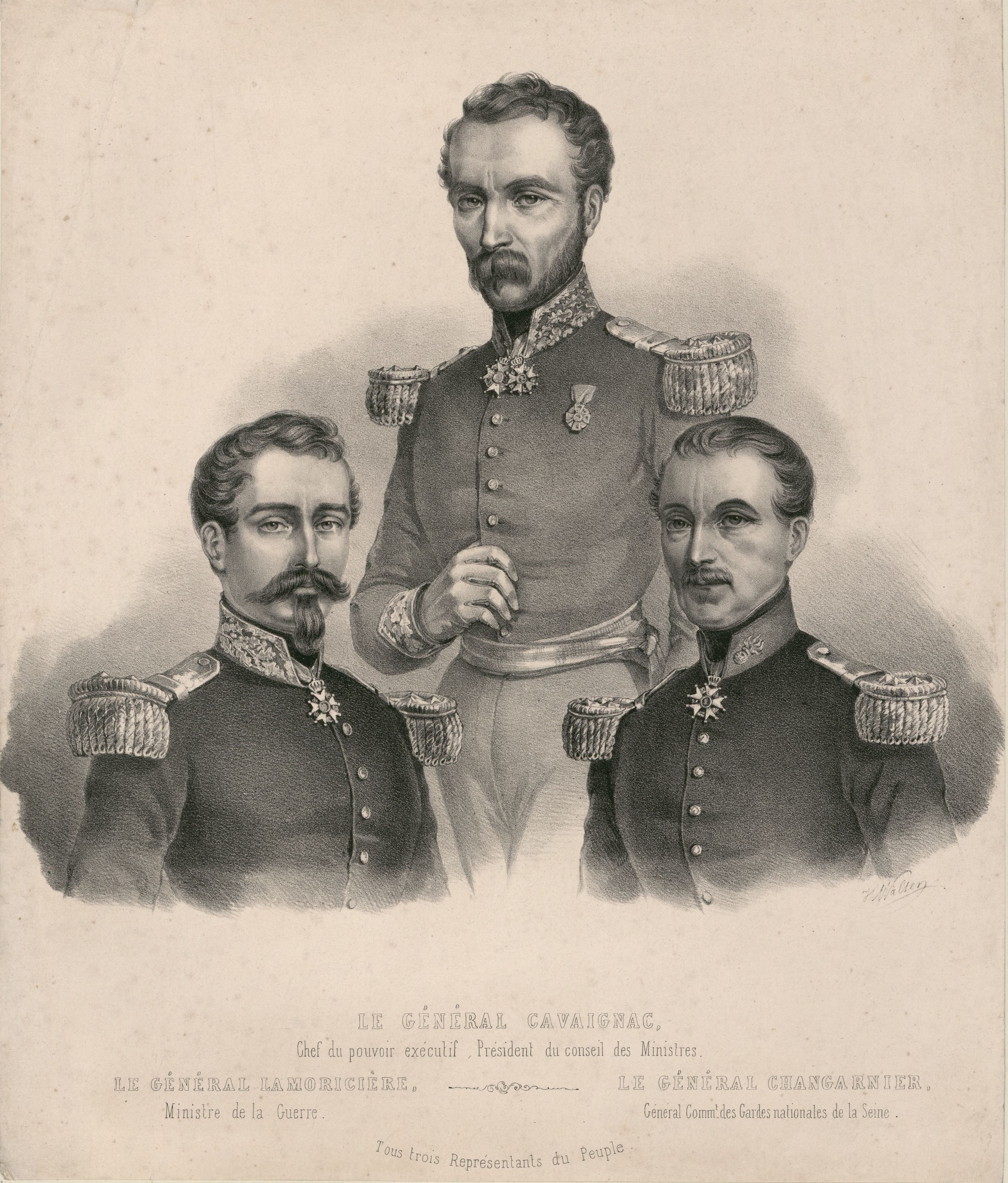
- Louis-Eugène Cavaignac, Louis Juchault de Lamoricière and Nicolas Changarnier.
- Date formed: 28 June 1848
- Date dissolved: 20 December 1848

People and organisations
- Head of state: Louis-Eugène Cavaignac
- Head of government: Louis-Eugène Cavaignac

History
- Predecessor: Executive Commission of 1848
- Successor: First cabinet of Odilon Barrot

The cabinet of General Cavaignac was the government of France from 28 June 1848 to 20 December 1848. It replaced the Executive Commission of 1848 after the June Days Uprising of 23 June to 26 June 1848. General Louis-Eugène Cavaignac (1802-1857) was given executive power by the National Assembly and headed the government as President of the Council of Ministers. The government was replaced by the first cabinet of Odilon Barrot on 20 December 1848 after Louis Napoleon had been elected as President.

== Ministers ==
The ministers were:

Portfolio	Holder	Party
President of the Council of Ministers	Eugène Cavaignac	Moderate Republican
Minister of Foreign Affairs	Marie Alphonse Bedeau	Military
Minister of the Interior	Jules Sénard	Moderate Republican
Minister of Justice	Eugène Bethmont	Moderate Republican
Minister of Finance	Michel Goudchaux	Moderate Republican
Minister of Public Works	Adrien Recurt	Moderate Republican
Minister of Trade and Agriculture	Charles Gilbert Tourret	Moderate Republican
Minister of Education	Hippolyte Carnot	Moderate Republican
Minister of War	Louis Juchault de Lamoricière	Military
Minister of the Navy and Colonies	Jules Bastide	Moderate Republican

Changes

- On 5 July 1848, Achille Tenaille de Vaulabelle substituted Hippolyte Carnot as Education Minister.
- On 17 July 1848, Pierre Marie de Saint-Georges substituted Eugène Bethmont as Justice Minister; Raymond de Verninac Saint-Maur substituted Jules Bastide as Navy Minister and Bastide substituted Marie Alphonse Bedeau as Foreign Affairs Minister.
- On 13 October 1848, Alexandre Pierre Freslon substituted Achille Tenaille de Vaulabelle as Education Minister; Jules Dufaure substituted Jules Sénard as Interior Minister and Alexandre-François Vivien substituted Adrien Recurt as Public Works Minister.
- On 25 October 1848, Ariste Jacques Trouvé-Chauvel substituted Michel Goudchaux as Finance Minister.

== Sources ==
- Fortescue, William (2005-04-08). France and 1848: The End of Monarchy. Routledge. ISBN 978-1-134-37923-1.
- Pickering, Mary (2009-09-14). Auguste Comte: Volume 2: An Intellectual Biography. Cambridge University Press. ISBN 978-0-521-51325-8.
- Robertson, Priscilla Smith (1952). Revolutions of 1848: A Social History. Princeton University Press. p. 102. ISBN 0-691-00756-X.
- Table analytique par ordre alphabétique de matières et de noms de personnes du Compte rendu des séances de l'Assemblée nationale constituante et des documents imprimés par son ordre: 4 mai 1848 - 27 mai 1849. H. et C. Noblet. 1850.
