= Verninac =

Verninac is a surname of French origin. Notable people with the surname include:

- Charles Étienne Raymond Victor de Verninac (1803–1834), French diplomat
- Henri de Verninac-Saint-Maur (1841–1901), French politician
- Henriette de Verninac (1780–1827), subject of a well-known neo-classical portrait by Jacques-Louis David
- Raymond de Verninac Saint-Maur (1762–1822), French diplomat
- Raymond-Jean-Baptiste de Verninac Saint-Maur (1794–1873), French naval officer
