= Raymond-Jean-Baptiste de Verninac Saint-Maur =

French naval officer

- Born: 11 June 1794; Souillac, Lot, France
- Died: 11 February 1873 (aged 78); Souillac, Lot, France
- Occupation: Naval officer
- Known for: Minister of the Navy and Colonies

Raymond-Jean-Baptiste de Verninac Saint-Maur (11 June 1794 – 11 February 1873) was a French naval officer who became a Minister of the Navy and Colonies in the Cabinet of General Cavaignac (28 June 1848 to 20 December 1848), and an Admiral in the Navy.

== Early years ==
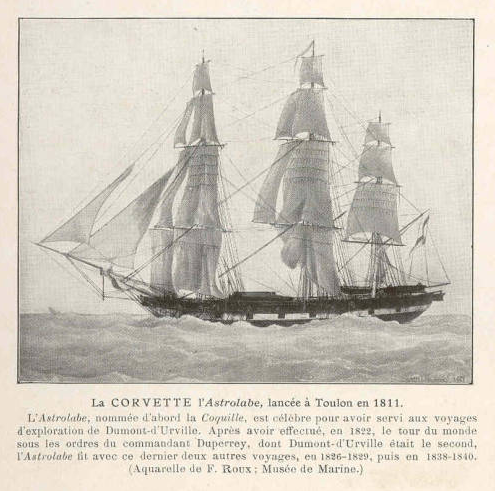
Corvette l'Astrolabe, Verninac's first command

The Verninac family originated in Gourdon, Lot in the former province of Quercy. Jean de Verninac was a counsellor of the king in Villefranche in 1696. Another family member was vicar-general of Rodez in 1786. His nephew was the diplomat Raymond de Verninac Saint-Maur.

Raymond-Jean-Baptiste de Verninac Saint-Maur was the son of François de Verninac (1753–1837) and Marie Delphy de Lisle of Salignac in Périgord. (Note: Several sources say the future Admiral's parents were Raymond de Verninac Saint-Maur (1762–1822) and Henriette Delacroix (1780–1827). The admiral was born in 1794, when Henriette was fourteen. Henriette married Raymond de Verninac in 1798. Raymond and Henriette had one child, Charles (1803–1834).) His father was brother of the diplomat Raymond de Verninac, He was born in Souillac on 11 June 1794. He entered the navy as a midshipman in 1812. He advanced slowly during the peace that followed the end of the Napoleonic Wars. He was promoted to sublieutenant in 1819 and lieutenant in 1824.

== Naval commands ==
In 1829 Verninac took command of the corvette L'Astrolabe, with which Jules Dumont d'Urville had made his first voyage around the world. He went to Alexandria to pick up the mission led by Jean-François Champollion, which had completed three years of exploration and studies in the Nile Valley. He took them back to Toulon, and made friends with Champollion on the voyage. He then participated in the Invasion of Algiers in 1830. He was promoted to Lieutenant Commander (Capitaine de corvette) in 1833.

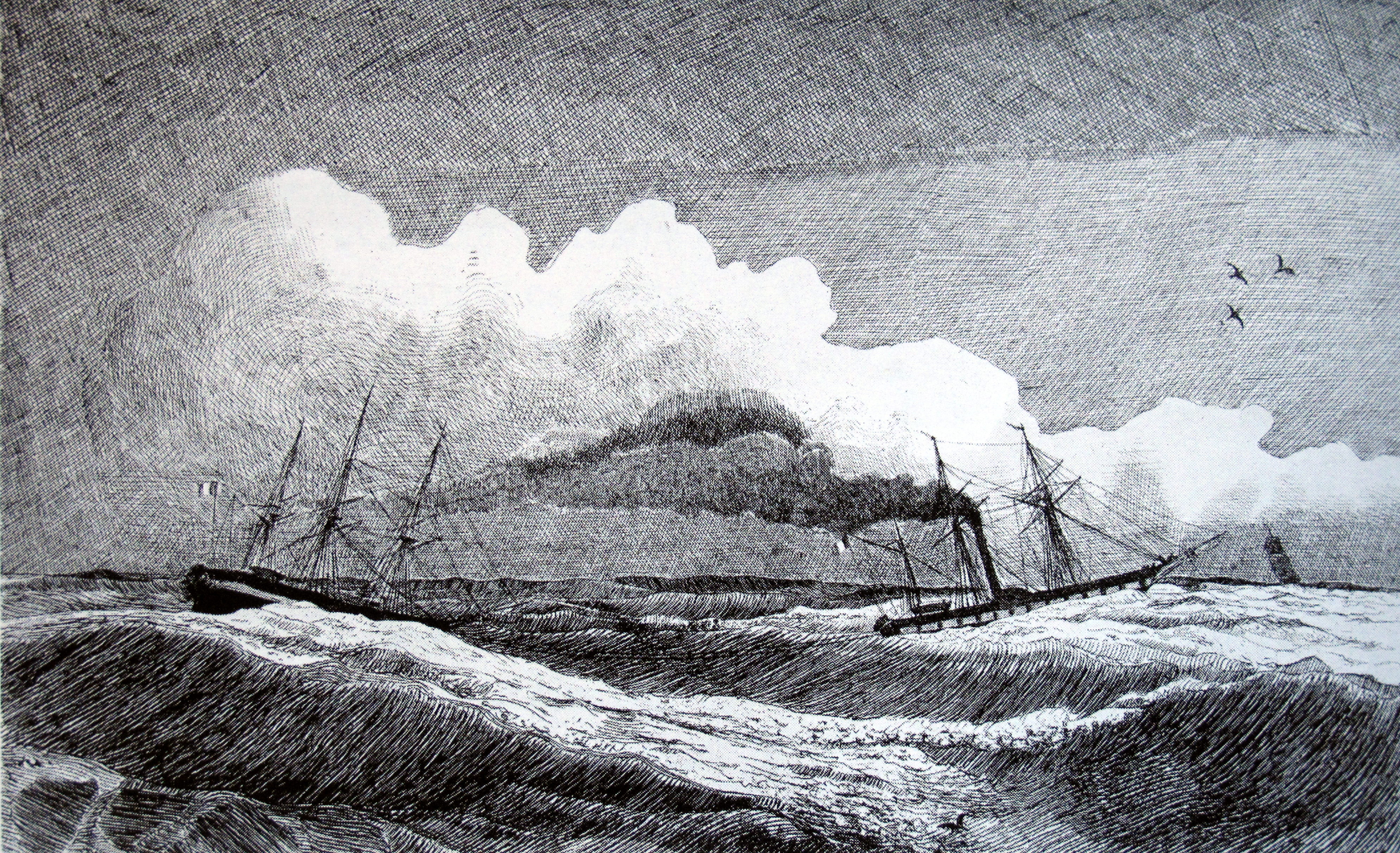
The corvette Sphinx tows the barge Luxor carrying the Luxor Obelisk to France

Muhammad Ali, effective ruler of Egypt, made a gift to France of an obelisk at Luxor weighing 230 tons, which had to be transported from Luxor back to France. Verninac was given command of the expedition on Champollion's recommendation. With the help of the naval engineer Apollinaire Lebas, Verninac developed the idea of cutting a flat-bottomed barge in half across its center, installing the obelisk, then rebuilding the barge so it could be towed down the Nile and on to France.

The steam corvette Le Sphinx, a three-masted schooner that was the first steam vessel of the French Navy, was used to tow the specially built Le Luxor barge, which carried the obelisk from Thebes to Paris. Verninac published an account of the voyage in 1834, Le voyage du Luxor en Égypte. The obelisk remained on the quay of the Seine for two years before being erected in the Place de la Concorde on 25 October 1836.

Verninac was promoted to Commander. In 1838 he was made director of the steam packet boats carrying mail in the Mediterranean. He was promoted to Captain in 1842. Verninac was appointed a member of a commission to organize and arm steam boats. He was one of the first captains to enter the Admiralty council in 1848. He was always interested in new ideas, and was quick to recognize the revolutionary impact of steam on naval warfare.

== Political career ==
Verninac was appointed under-secretary of state for the Navy and Colonies on 6 June 1848, and Minister of the Navy and Colonies from 17 July to 20 December 1848 in the cabinet headed by General Louis-Eugène Cavaignac. He became a deputy for Lot in July 1848. Severe cuts to the naval budget prevented Verninac from implementing his ideas for reform of the navy and construction of modern vessels. He was named Rear Admiral on 16 December 1848. He left office fours days later when Louis Napoleon Bonaparte was announced winner of the presidential elections. Verminac chose to remain faithful to Cavaignac.

== Later years ==
On 8 July 1849 Verninac was elected representative for Lot in the Legislative Assembly. He was general councillor for Lot from 1848 to 1852. Verninac did not sit in the Assembly after the coup d'état of 2 December 1851. Bonaparte named him governor of Réunion, then of the French establishments in India. He retired from active service in June 1856, and returned to France in 1857. On 30 December 1864 he was made Commander of the Legion of Honour.

Verninac died at Souillac on 11 February 1873 at the age of 78. The Admiral's son Louis-Raymond de Verninac de Saint-Maur became a Commander in the navy. His son Charles de Verninac was elected Senator for Lot in 1883. A bust of Verninac was installed in Souillac in 1898, but was removed by German occupying forces in 1942. A replacement bust by the sculptor Pascal Peltier was erected on 30 June 2007.
