= Hôtel de Galliffet =

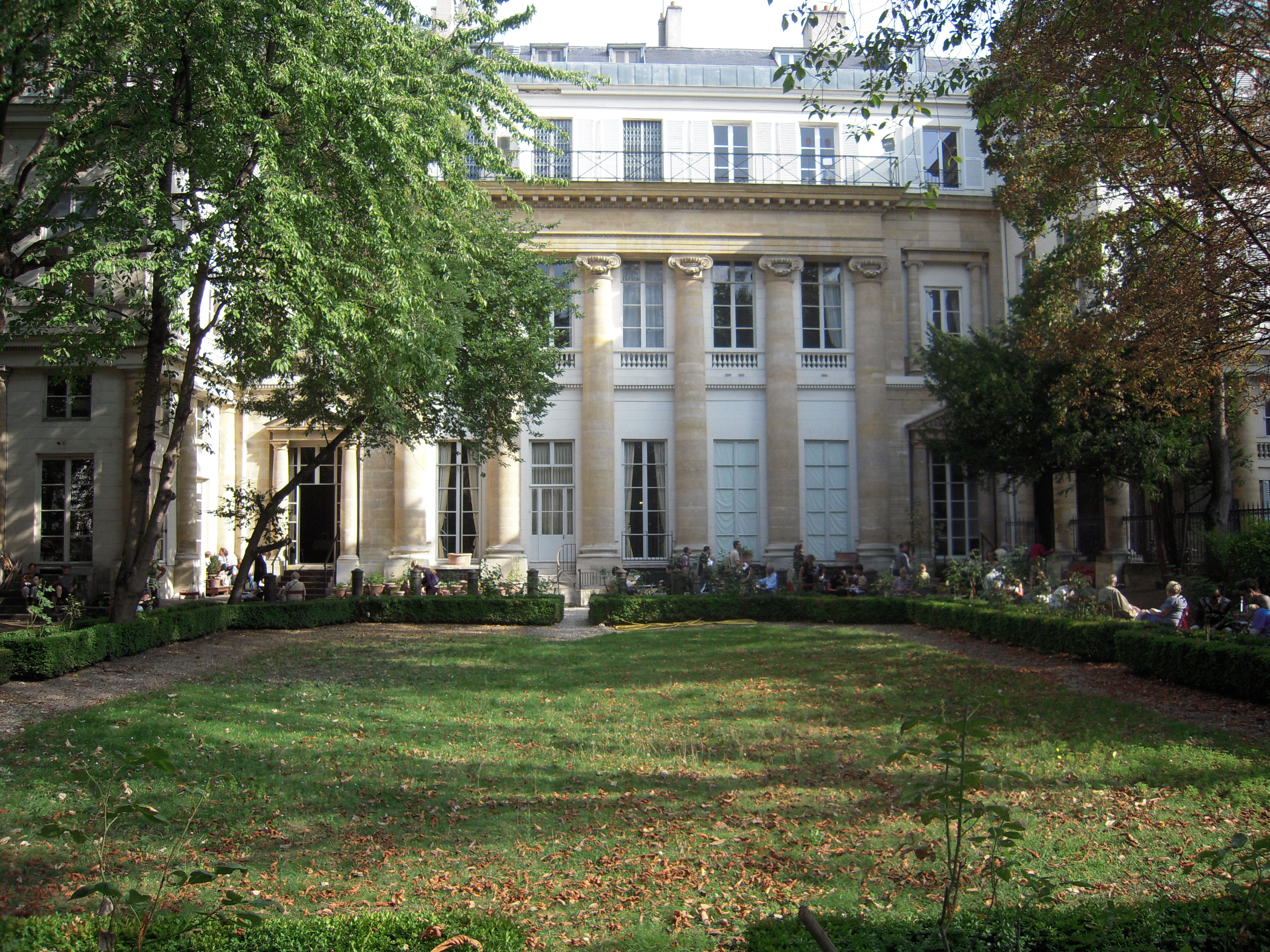
- The Hôtel de Galliffet in 2009
- Interactive map of the Hôtel de Galliffet area

General information
- Type: Hôtel particulier
- Location: Paris, France
- Coordinates: 48.8548°N 2.3233°E
- Construction started: 1776
- Completed: 1792
- Client: Alexandre de Galliffet

Design and construction
- Architects: Etienne-François Le Grand; Jean-Baptiste Boiston

The Hôtel de Galliffet is a historic hôtel particulier in the 7th arrondissement of Paris, France.

== History ==
The hotel was built from 1776 to 1792, for Alexandre de Galliffet, the President of the Parlement of Aix-en-Provence who also built the Château du Tholonet in Le Tholonet. It was designed by Etienne François Legrand.

Subsequently, the hotel was the residence of Minister Charles-François Delacroix, and thus the childhood home of General Charles-Henri Delacroix and painter Eugène Delacroix. It was later the residence of Charles Maurice de Talleyrand-Périgord, who served as the Prime Minister of France in 1815.

In 1972 the building was used as the Italian embassy. The hotel is now home to the Italian Cultural Institute in Paris.
