= Adolphe Crémieux =

French lawyer and politician

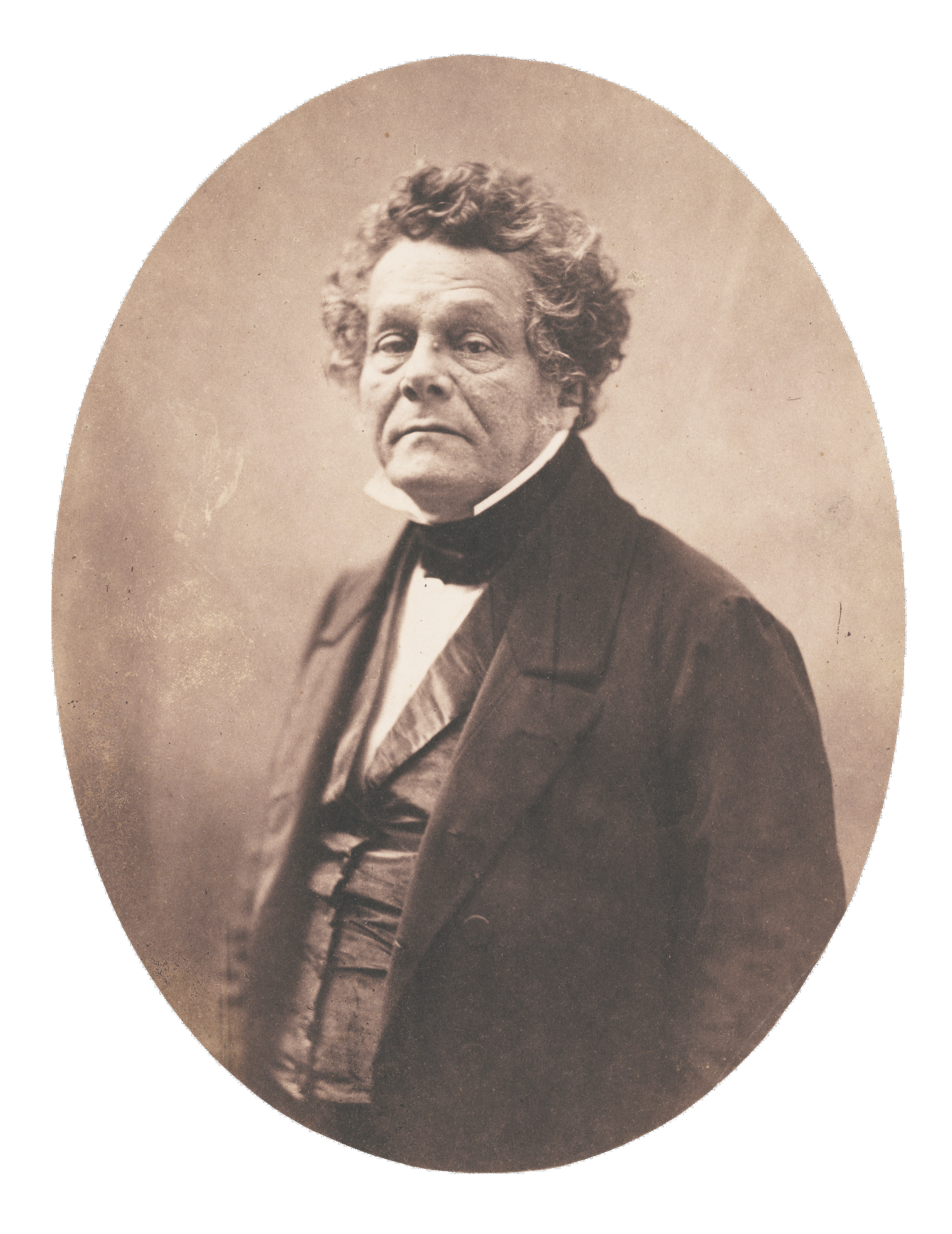
- Portrait of Adolphe Crémieux by Nadar, 1856

Minister of Justice
- In office 4 September 1870 – 17 February 1871
- Preceded by: Théodore Grandperret
- Succeeded by: Jules Armand Dufaure
- In office 25 February 1848 – 7 June 1848
- Preceded by: Michel Hébert
- Succeeded by: Eugène Bethmont

Personal details
- Born: Isaac-Jacob Crémieu; 30 April 1796 Nîmes, France
- Died: 10 February 1880 (aged 83) Paris, France
- Resting place: Montparnasse Cemetery, Paris
- Profession: Lawyer
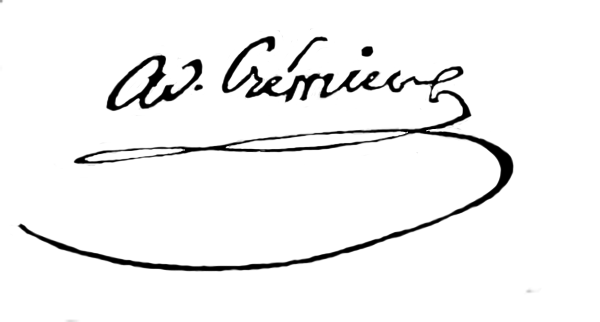
- Signature

Isaac-Jacob Adolphe Crémieux (French: [adɔlf kʁemjø]; 30 April 1796 – 10 February 1880) was a French lawyer and politician who served as Minister of Justice under the Second Republic (1848) and Government of National Defense (1870–1871). Raised Jewish, he served as president of the Alliance Israélite Universelle (1863–67; 1868–80), secured French citizenship for Algerian Jews under French rule through the Crémieux Decree (1870), and was a staunch defender of the rights of the Jews of France.

== Biography ==
He was born in Nîmes to a wealthy Papal Jew family, which had migrated from the papal enclave of Carpentras to Nîmes. He married a member of the Silny family in 1824.

== Political career ==
After the July Revolution of 1830 he came to Paris, formed connections with numerous political figures, even with King Louis Philippe, and became a brilliant defender of Liberal ideas in the law courts and in the press. Examples include his Éloge funèbre of the bishop Grégoire (1830), his Mémoire for the political rehabilitation of Marshal Ney (1833), and his plea for the accused of April 1835. Elected deputy in 1842, he was one of the leaders in the campaign against the Guizot ministry, and his eloquence contributed greatly to the success of his party.

From 1834 until his death, Crémieux served as vice-president of the "Consistoire Central des Israélites de France" (Central Consistory of the Jews of France), the administrative agency for all French Jews. On 24 February 1848 he was chosen by the Republicans as a member of the provisional government, and as minister of justice he secured the decrees abolishing the death penalty for political offenses, and making the office of judge immovable. That same year he was instrumental in declaring an end to slavery in all French Colonies, for which some have called him the French Abraham Lincoln. When the conflict between the Republicans and Socialists broke out, he resigned office but continued to sit in the constituent assembly. At first he supported Louis Napoleon, but when he discovered the prince's imperial ambitions he broke with him.

Arrested and imprisoned on 2 December 1851, he remained in private life until November 1869, when he was elected as a Republican deputy for Paris. On 4 September 1870 he was again chosen as a member of the government of national defense, and resumed his position in the ministry of justice. He then formed part of the Delegation of Tours, but took no part in the completion of the organization of defense. He resigned with his colleagues on 14 February 1871. Eight months later he was elected deputy, then life senator in 1875.

Crémieux did much to better the condition of the Jews. In 1827, he advocated the repeal of the More judaico, legislation stigmatizing the Jews left over from pre-revolutionary France. He was an early supporter of the Alliance Israélite Universelle—established in Paris in 1860—serving as its president from 1863 to 1867, then again from 1868 until his death in 1880. In 1866 Crémieux traveled to Saint Petersburg to successfully defend Jews of Saratov who had been accused in a case of blood libel.

Crémieux published a Recueil of his political cases (1869), and the Actes de la délégation de Tours et de Bordeaux (2 vols, 1871).

== Crémieux Decree ==
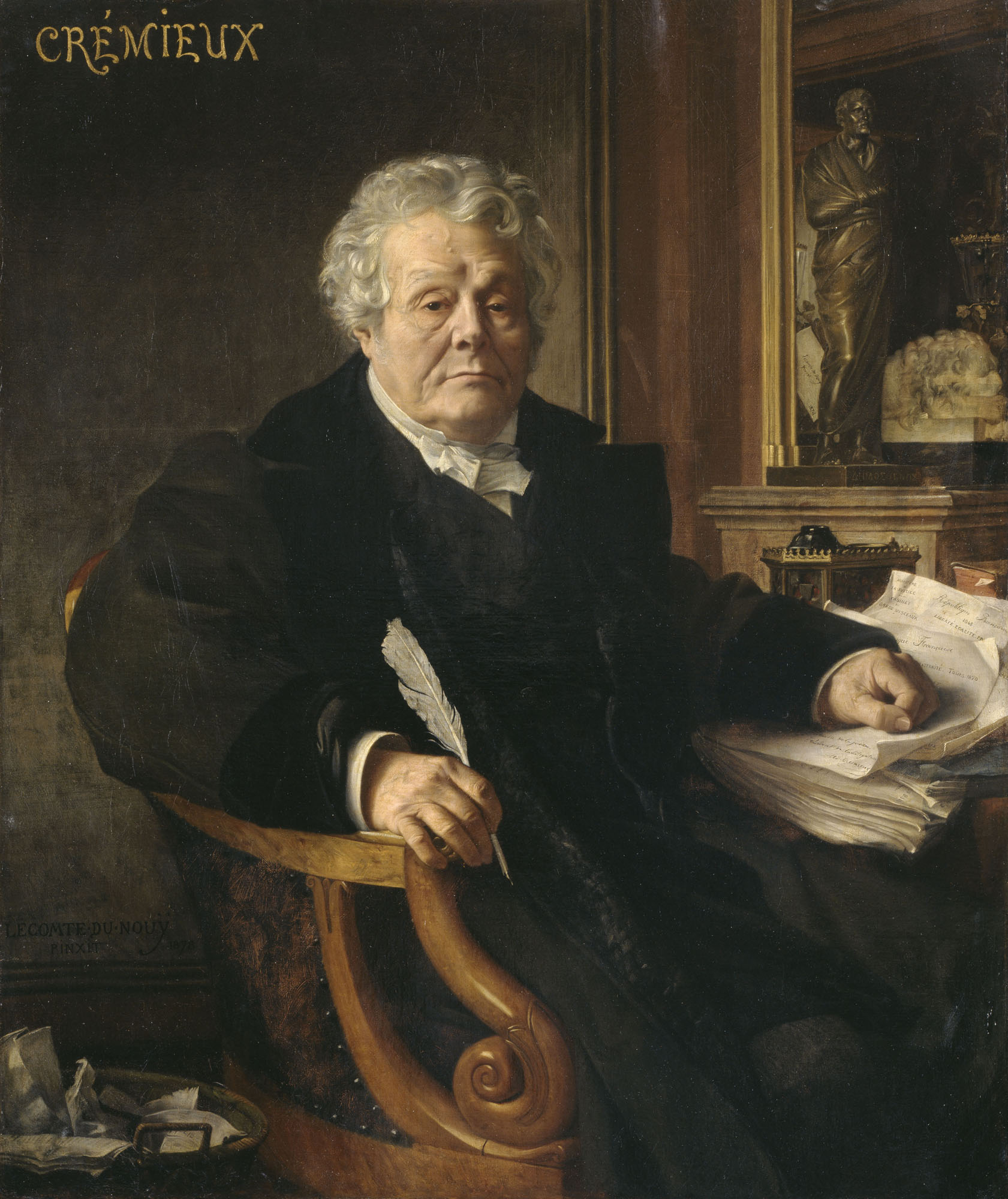
Adolphe Crémieux portrayed by Jean-Jules-Antoine Lecomte du Nouÿ (1878) Musée d'Art et d'Histoire du Judaïsme

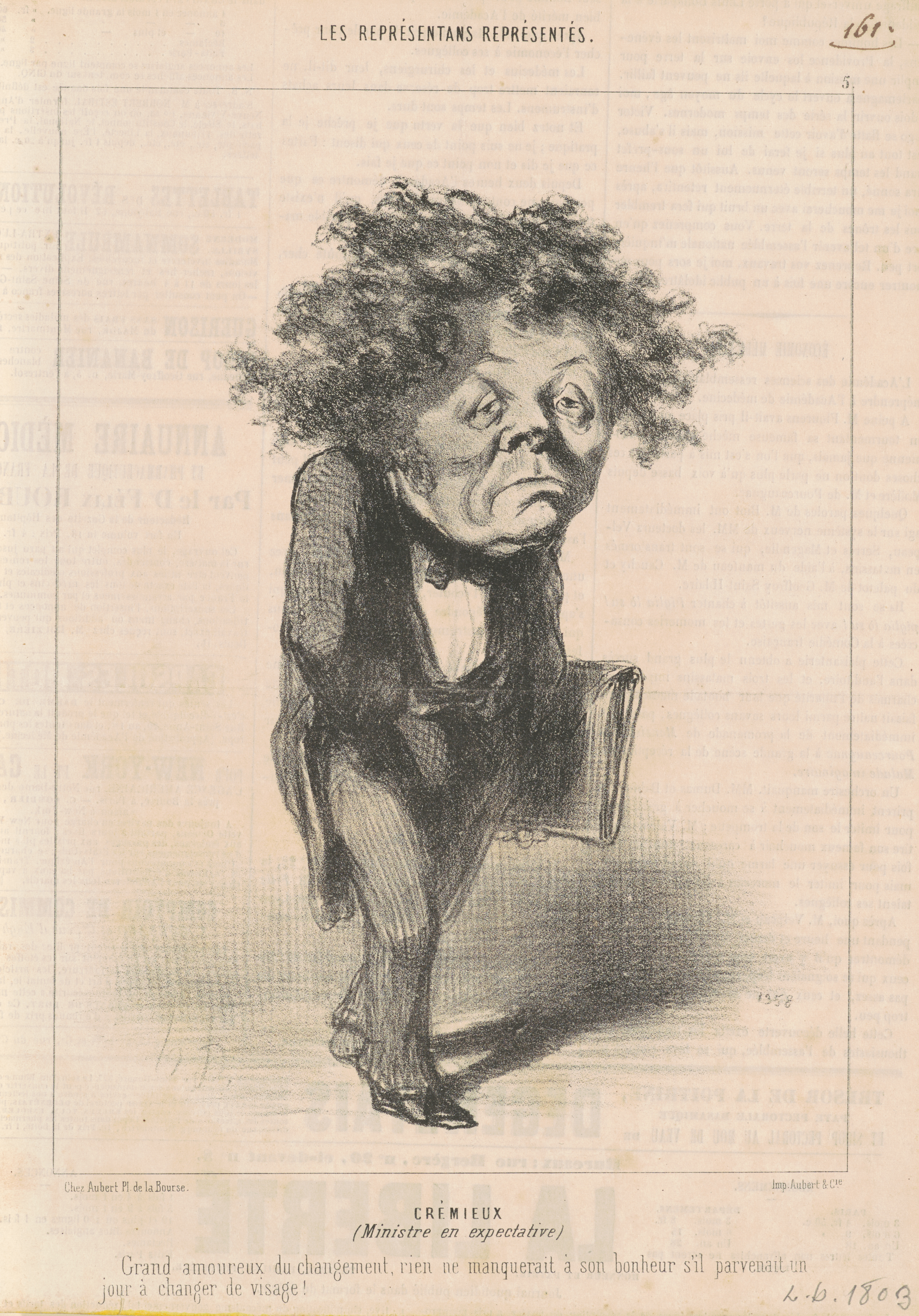
Honoré Daumier, Adolphe Crémieux, 19th century

While in the government of the national defence, he secured full citizenship for the Jews in French-ruled Algeria, through the Crémieux Decree (décret n^{o} 136 du 24 octobre 1870). The decree allowed for native Jews to become French citizens while Muslim Arabs and Berbers were excluded and remained under the second-class ‘indigenous’ status outlined in the Code de l'Indigénat. This set the scene for deteriorating relations between the Muslim and Jewish communities, and later proved fateful in the Algerian War of Independence, after which the vast majority of Algerian Jews emigrated to France.

== Freemasonry ==
Initiated freemason in 1818, at "Bienfait Anonyme" Grand Orient de France lodge in Nîmes, he joined "Aide-toi, le Ciel t'aidera" lodge in Paris during 1830. In 1866 he joined Suprême Conseil de France and became 33rd degree and Great Commander in 1868. During his masonic career, he encouraged republicans and monarchists to work together.

== Death ==
Crémieux died in Paris in 1880 and was buried at Montparnasse cemetery.

== Commemoration ==
A street is named after him in Jerusalem's German Colony neighborhood, as well as in central Tel Aviv and the French Carmel district in Haifa.

He is the subject of two lithographs by Honoré Daumier, both poking fun at his ugliness. The first was in 1848 in the "Representatives Represented" series, with caption "Great lover of change, nothing would be missing from his happiness if one day he changed his face!" The other was a year later, captioned, "Mr. Crémieux looking for an apartment: If I rent this lodging, I would like the landlord to take down this dreadful portrait... oh! but, Good God, it's a mirror!..."

Political offices
Preceded by Michel Hebert	Minister of Justice; 1848	Succeeded by Eugène Bethmont
Preceded by Michel Grandperret	Minister of Justice; 1870–1871	Succeeded by Jules Dufaure
