= Portrait of Henriette de Verninac =

Painting by Jacques-Louis David

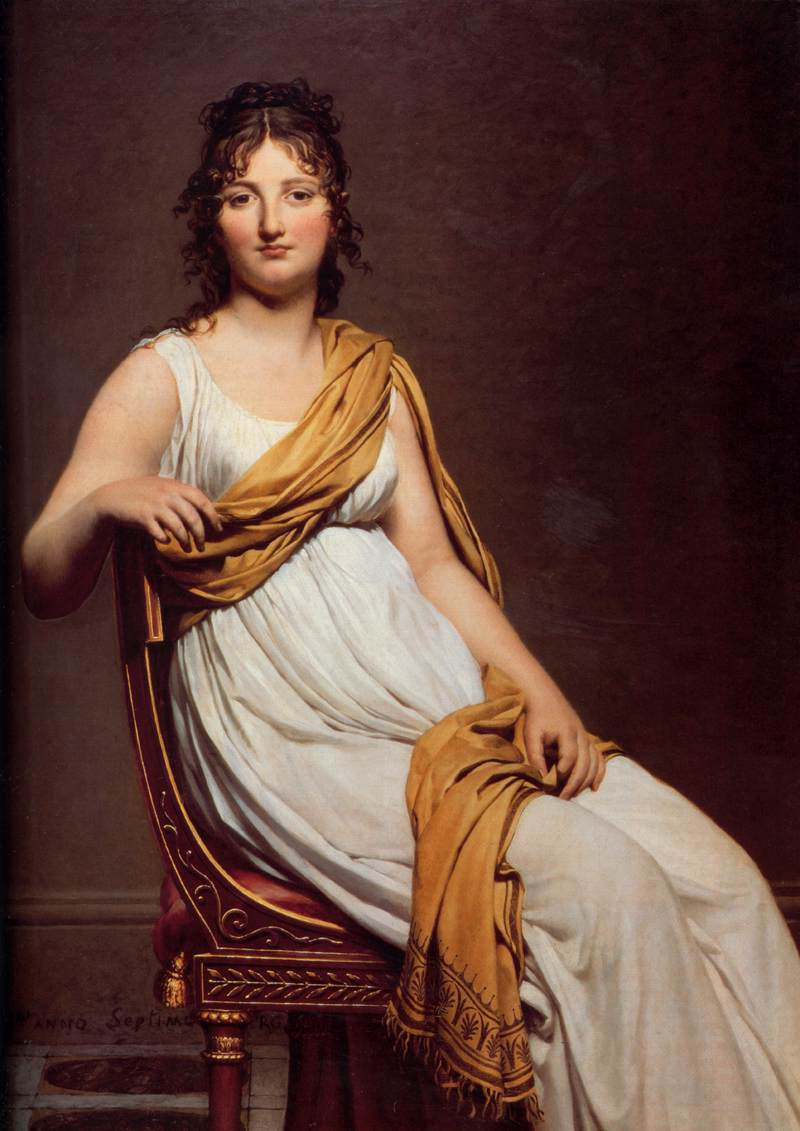
- Artist: Jacques-Louis David
- Year: 1799
- Type: Oil on canvas, portrait painting
- Dimensions: 145.5 cm × 112 cm (57.3 in × 44 in)
- Location: Louvre, Paris

Portrait of Henriette de Verninac is a 1799 portrait painting by the French artist Jacques-Louis David of Henriette de Verninac in Neoclassical style. She was the wife of the diplomat Raymond de Verninac, the daughter of the French Revolutionary Foreign Minister Charles-François Delacroix and the elder sister of the future artist Eugène Delacroix. Commissioned by her husband not long after her marriage, she is shown at the age of nineteen in an assured, Junoesque manner.

The painting is today in the collection of the Louvre in Paris, having been acquired in 1942.

== See also ==
- List of paintings by Jacques-Louis David

== Bibliography ==
- Bordes, Phillipe. Jacques-Louis David: Empire to Exile. Yale University Press, 2007.
- Bryson, Norman. Hersilia's Sisters: Jacques-Louis David, Women, and the Emergence of Civil Society in Post-Revolution France. J. Paul Getty Trust, 20223.
