= Éléonore Tenaille de Vaulabelle =

French writer and playwright (1801–1859)

Éléonore Tenaille de Vaulabelle (12 Oct. 1801 – 12 October 1859) was a French writer and playwright. He published his novels under the pseudonym Ernest Desprez and all his plays under the name Jules Cordier.

== Biography ==
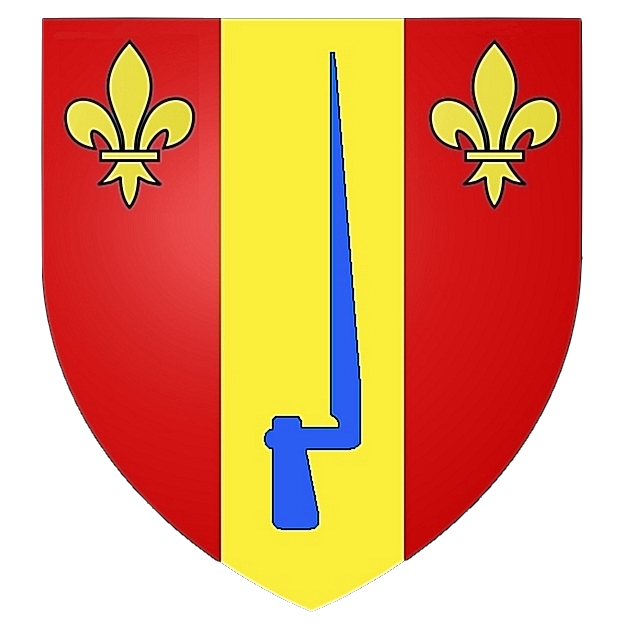
Coat of arms of the Tenaille de Vaulabelle family: Of "Gules with golden pal, accosted with two fleurs-de-lis of the same and loaded with an azure bayonet"

After he spent his youth in Bourgogne, Éléonore de Vaulabelle moved to Paris at the end of the Bourbon restauration. There he authored articles in several satirical newspapers as well as a daily pamphlet for Le Figaro, where he met Alphonse Karr and George Sand.

He wrote two novels under the pseudonym Ernest Desprez and a fictionalized autobiography: Un enfant. In Les Femmes vengées, he developed a theory inspired from Molière: "Women are what we make of them". Vaulabelle adds, "If women lie it is because we teach them to lie". But he devoted most of his work to theatre under the pseudonym Jules Cordier, most of the time in collaboration with Clairville. Only the collection of short stories Les Jours heureux appeared under his real name.

If he privately adhered to Republican ideas - probably under the influence of his older brother, Achille Tenaille de Vaulabelle, author of Histoire des deux Restaurations and Minister of Education under general Louis-Eugène Cavaignac's presidency in 1848 – in theatre, he expressed his opposition to the regime according to the forms of the time.

== Works ==
=== Theatre ===
- 1831: La Tireuse de cartes, melodrama in 3 acts by Ernest Desprez and Jules-Édouard Alboize, music by Obell, Théâtre Molière (9 June) then Théâtre de la Gaîté (13 April 1832) - J.-N. Barba, Paris, 1832
- 1834: Un enfant, drama in 4 acts by Charles Desnoyer and *** [Vaulabelle], imitated from the novel by Ernest Desprez, Théâtre de la Gaîté (21 June) - Marchant, Paris
- 1836: Clémentine, comédie-vaudeville in 1 act by Jacques-François Ancelot and J. Cordier, Théâtre du Palais-Royal (7 March) - Marchant, Paris
- 1838: Les Trois Dimanches, comédie-vaudeville in 3 acts by the Cogniard brothers and J. Cordier, Théâtre du Palais-Royal (19 August) - Marchant, Paris
- 1838: Contre fortune, bon cœur, comédie-vaudeville in 1 act by J. Cordier, Théâtre du Vaudeville (21 February) - Marchant, Paris, 1839
- 1840: Le Mari de ma fille, comédie-vaudeville in 1 act by Jacques-François Ancelot and J. Cordier, Théâtre du Vaudeville (25 August) - Marchant, Paris
- 1841: Les Willis,vaudeville in 1 act by Vaulabelle and Auguste Pittaud de Forges, Théâtre du Palais-Royal (19 October)
- 1842: Le Mari à l'essai, comédie-vaudeville in 1 act by Jean-François Bayard and J. Cordier, Théâtre du Palais-Royal (4 May) - Beck, Paris
- 1844: La Polka en province, folie-vaudeville in 1 act by Alexis Decomberousse and J. Cordier, Théâtre du Vaudeville (6 April) - Giroux and Vialat, Saint-Denis-du-Port
- 1845: La Polka en province, folie-vaudeville in 1 act by A. Decomberousse and J. Cordier - Beck, Paris
- 1846: Colombe et Perdreau, idylle in 3 acts by Clairville and J. Cordier, Théâtre des Variétés (15 August) - Maistrasse and Wiart, Paris
- 1846: Les Dieux de l'Olympe à Paris, vaudeville in 6 tableaux by Clairville and J. Cordier, Théâtre du Vaudeville (26 February) - Beck, Paris
- 1846: La Femme électrique, folie-vaudeville in 1 act by Clairville and J. Cordier, Théâtre du Palais-Royal (9 May) - Marchant, Paris
- 1847: Éther, magnétisme et hatchis, à-propos-vaudeville in 1 act by Clairville and J. Cordier, Théâtre des Variétés (4 April) - Tresse, Paris, 1846
- 1848: Ah! enfin! pièce d'ouverture in 3 acts and 2 intermission by Clairville, J. Cordier and Léon Dumoustier, Théâtre du Vaudeville (29 April) - Beck, Paris
- 1848: L'Avenir dans le passé ou les Succès au paradis, à-propos-vaudeville in 1 act by Clairville and J. Cordier, Théâtre du Vaudeville (30 September) - Beck, Paris
- 1848: Le Club des maris et le Club des femmes, vaudeville in 1 act by Clairville and J. Cordier, Théâtre du Vaudeville (4 June) - Beck, Paris
- 1848: Les Filles de la liberté, à-propos-vaudeville in 1 act, by Clairville and J. Cordier, thTâtre du Gymnase-Dramatique (14 March) - Beck, Paris
- 1848: Les Parades de nos pères, folie in 3 tableaux from ancient parades by Dumanoir, Clairville and J. Cordier, Théâtre Montansier (6 October) - G. Olivier, Paris
- 1848: La Tireuse de cartes, vaudeville in 1 act by Clairville and J. Cordier, Théâtre des Variétés (9 January) - Beck, Paris
- 1848: Un petit de la mobile, comédie-vaudeville in 2 acts by Clairville and J. Cordier, Théâtre des Variétés (7 August) - Beck, Paris
- 1849: Daphnis et Chloé, vaudeville in 1 act by Clairville and J. Cordier, Théâtre du Vaudeville (23 November) - Beck, Paris
- 1849: Les Grenouilles qui demandent un roi, vaudeville in 1 act by Clairville, Arthur de Beauplan and J. Cordier, Théâtre du Gymnase (26 February) - Beck, Paris
- 1849: Les Partageux, vaudeville in 1 act by Clairville and J. Cordier, Théâtre du Gymnase-Dramatique (17 November) - Beck, Paris
- 1848: La Propriété, c'est le vol, folie-socialiste in 3 acts and 7 tableaux by Clairville and J. Cordier, Théâtre du Vaudeville (28 November) - Beck, Paris, 1849
- 1849: Les Représentants en vacances, comédie vaudeville in 3 acts by Clairville and J. Cordier, Théâtre du Gymnase-Dramatique (15 September) - Beck, Paris
- 1849: Une semaine à Londres ou les Trains de plaisirs, folie-vaudeville extravaganza in 3 acts and 11 tableaux by Clairville and J. Cordier, music by Victor Chéri, Théâtre du Vaudeville (9 August) - Beck, Paris; new version, Théâtre des Variétés, 23 June 1862 - Dentu, Paris
- 1850: L'Alchimiste ou le Train de plaisir pour la Californie, vaudeville in 3 acts by Clairville and J. Cordier, Théâtre des Variétés (8 August) - Beck, Paris
- 1850: Le Bourgeois de Paris ou les Leçons au Pouvoir, comédie-vaudeville in 3 acts and 6 tableaux, Théâtre du Gymnase-Dramatique (15 June) - Dondey-Dupré, Paris
- 1850: C'en était un! pochade in 1 act, mingled with couplets by Clairville and J. Cordier, Théâtre Montansier (31 May) - Beck, Paris
- 1849: Paris sans impôts, vaudeville in 3 acts and 6 tableaux by Clairville and J. Cordier, Théâtre du Vaudeville (28 December) - Beck, Paris, 1850
- 1850: Les Tentations d'Antoinette, vaudeville in 5 acts by Clairville and J. Cordier, Théâtre du Gymnase (29 November) - Beck, Paris
- 1850: Les Secrets du diable, féerie-vaudeville in 2 acts, extravaganza by Clairville and J. Cordier, Théâtre du Vaudeville (23 February) - Beck, Paris
- 1851: Le Duel au baiser, comedy mingled with couplets in 1 act by Clairville and J. Cordier, Théâtre Montansier (17 June) - Beck, Paris
- 1851: La Dot de Marie, comédie-vaudeville in 1 act by Clairville and J. Cordier, Théâtre du Gymnase (18 January) - D. Giraud and J. Dagneau, Paris
- 1850: Le Journal pour rire, revue in 1 act and 3 tableaux by Clairville and J. Cordier, Théâtre de la Porte-Saint-Martin (25 December) - Beck, Paris, 1851
- 1851: Le Palais de cristal ou les Parisiens à Londres, grande revue on the occasion of The Great Exhibition, Théâtre de la Porte-Saint-Martin (26 May) - Beck, Paris
- 1852: Les Compagnons d'Ulysse, vaudeville in 1 act and 2 tableaux by Clairville and J. Cordier, Théâtre du Vaudeville (5 July) - Beck, Paris
- 1852: La Maîtresse d'été et la Maîtresse d'hiver, comédie-vaudeville in 3 acts by Clairville and J. Cordier, Théâtre du Vaudeville (29 May) - Beck, Paris
- 1852: La Mère Moreau, « débit de chinois, mêlé de prunes et de couplets », pochade in 1 act by Clairville and J. Cordier, Théâtre du Palais-Royal (1 August) - Beck, Paris
- 1852: La Queue du diable, vaudeville fantastique in 3 acts by Clairville and J. Cordier, Théâtre de la Porte-Saint-Martin (29 July) - Beck, Paris
- 1851: La Vénus à la fraise, folie in 1 act mingled with couplets by Clairville and J. Cordier, Théâtre du Palais-Royal (31 December) - Beck, Paris, 1852
- 1852: Les Abeilles et les Violettes, revue extravaganza in 6 tableaux by Clairville and J. Cordier, Théâtre du Vaudeville (28 December) - Beck, Paris, 1853 (read Online)
- 1853: Le Baromètre des amours, comédie-vaudeville in 5 acts, by Clairville and J. Cordier, Théâtre du Vaudeville (11 January) - Beck, Paris
- 1853: Cadet-Roussel, Dumollet, Gribouille et Cie, bambochade in 3 acts, preceded with a prologue in verses, Théâtre des Folies-Dramatiques (15 June) - Beck, Paris; rééd. Tresse, Paris, 1860
- 1853: L'Esprit frappeur ou les Sept Merveilles du jour, comédie-vaudeville in 1 act by Clairville and J. Cordier, music by Sylvain Mangeant, Théâtre du Palais-Royal (17 December) - Beck, Paris
- 1853: Fraichement décorée, à-propos-vaudeville in 1 act by Clairville and J. Cordier, Théâtre du Palais-Royal (25 June) - Beck, Paris
- 1853: La Vie à bon marché, vaudeville in 1 act by Clairville, J. Cordier and Louis Couailhac, Théâtre du Vaudeville (5 April) - Beck, Paris
- 1854: Les Contes de la Mère l'oie, grande féerie in 5 acts and 22 tableaux by Clairville and J. Cordier, Théâtre de l'Ambigu-Comique (20 May) - Beck, Paris
- 1854: Mesdames les pirates, vaudeville extravaganza by Clairville and J. Cordier, Théâtre du Vaudeville (25 February) - Beck, Paris
- 1854: La Mort de Pompée, comédie-vaudeville in 3 acts by J. Cordier, Théâtre du Palais-Royal (18 July) - J. Dagneau, Paris
- 1855: Les Binettes contemporaines, revue in 3 acts and 7 tableaux by Clairville and J. Cordier, Théâtre du Palais-Royal (23 December) - Beck, Paris
- 1858: Un dîner et des égards, comédie-vaudeville in 1 act by J. Cordier and Léon Dumoustier, Théâtre du Palais-Royal (13 June) - Michel-Lévy frères, Paris
- 1858: Une dame pour voyager, vaudeville in 1 act by J. Cordier, Théâtre des Variétés (31 May) - Michel-Lévy frères, Paris
- 1859: Le Banquet des Barbettes, comédie-vaudeville in 2 acts by Clairville and J. Cordier, Théâtre du Palais-Royal (17 June) - Beck, Paris
- 1866 (posthumous): Daphnis et Chloé, opéra-bouffe in 1 act by Clairville and J. Cordier, music by Jacques Offenbach, Théâtre des Bouffes-Parisiens (6 October) - Beck, Paris

=== Novels and other texts ===
- Épître à Sidi Mahmoud... after Quérard, with Jules Méry, Ladvocat, Paris, 1825
- L'Étang de Varzy (short story) in Journal des enfans, Everat, Paris, 1832-1833 (Read Online)
- Le Troc des âges (tale) in Journal des enfans, Everat, Paris, 1832-1833 (Read Online)
- Les Grisettes à Paris, Ladvocat, Paris, 1832 (Read Online); rééd. la Première Heure, Marseille, 2007
- Le dimanche à Paris, Nouveau tableau de Paris au XIX me siècle, tome deuxième, Librairie de Madame Charles-Béchet, Paris, 1834 (Read Online)
- Les Jours heureux, contes et morale à l'usage des enfans des deux sexes, Dumont, Paris, 1836 (Read Online)

under the pseudonym Ernest Desprez

- Une seconde famille (nouvelle) in Journal des enfans, Everat, Paris, 1832-1833
- Un enfant (roman), 3 vol., C. Gosselin, Paris, 1833 (Read Online)
- Les Femmes vengées (roman), 2 vol., A. Ledoux, Paris, 1834
- Le Fils de Claire d'Albe (nouvelle) dans Le Sachet, Poulton, Paris, 1835

under the pseudonyme de C. de Saint-Estève

- M. de Similor en Californie, A. Courcier, Paris, 1856 (2e éd.)

== Arbre généalogique ==
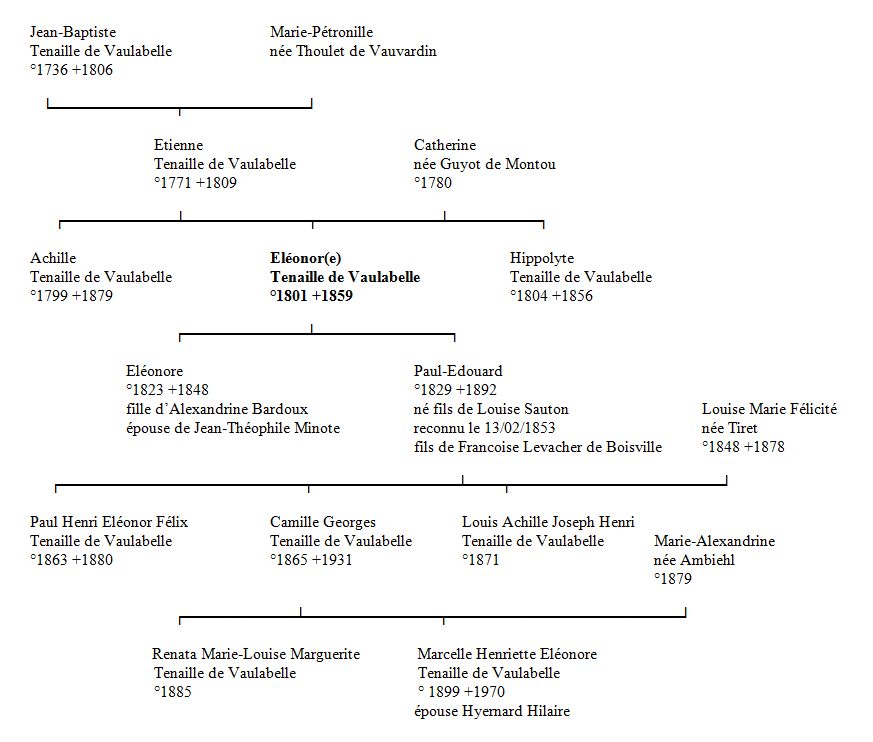

== Bibliography ==
- Frédéric de Berthier de Grandry, La Famille d’Achille Tenaille de Vaulabelle (1799-1879), un ministre pionnier de l’Education nationale, préface de Jean-Pierre Soisson, Paris, 1998–2004, (ISBN 978-2-9513699-2-4)
- Philibert Audebrand, « Le Journal au théâtre », Petits mémoires d'une stalle d'orchestre: acteurs, actrices, auteurs, journalistes, Paris, Jules Lévy libraire-éditeur, 1885, p. 167-179.
- « Éléonore Tenaille de Vaulabelle », Biographie universelle ancienne et moderne, t.|95, Beck, 1862, p. 209-211.
