= Charles-Henri Delacroix =

French general

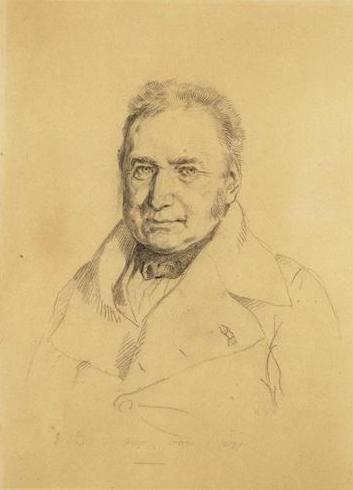
- Portrait by his brother, Eugène Delacroix
- Born: 9 January 1779; Paris, France
- Died: 30 December 1845 (aged 66); Bordeaux, France
- Occupation: General
- Father: Charles-François Delacroix
- Relatives: Henriette de Verninac (sister); Eugène Delacroix (brother)

Charles-Henri Delacroix (French pronunciation: [ʃaʁl ɑ̃ʁi dəlakʁwa]; 9 January 1779 – 30 December 1845) was a French soldier who became a general in the Napoleonic army. He was the older brother of the painter Eugène Delacroix.

== Family background ==
Charles-Henri Delacroix was born in Paris on 9 January 1779. His father was Charles-François Delacroix (or Lacroix), minister of Foreign Affairs under the Directory. His mother was Victoire Oëbène. His sister Henriette was born in 1780. She married the diplomat Raymond de Verninac Saint-Maur (1762-1822). His brother Henri was born six year later. He was killed at the Battle of Friedland on 14 June 1807. His youngest brother was the future painter Eugène Delacroix (1798–1863), born twenty years after him. (Note: It was rumored that Charles-François Delacroix was not the father of Eugène Delacroix, but that his real father was the statesman Charles Maurice de Talleyrand,)

== Military career ==
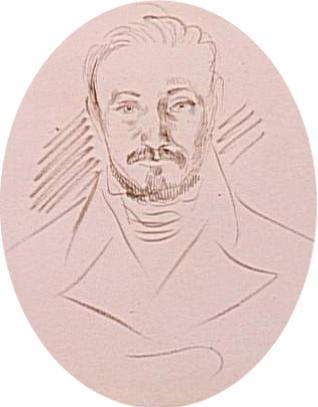
Sketch by Eugène Delacroix

On 4 November 1793 Delacroix enlisted as a naval volunteer. He became a first class ensign on 27 April 1794, and was discharged in 1796. On 8 January 1799 he enlisted as a second lieutenant in the 9th Chasseurs-a-Cheval Regiment. He participated in the campaign of the Army of Italy that year. General Joubert promoted him to Lieutenant on 13 August 1799 in recognition of his gallantry. On 3 January 1800 he was accepted as Lieutenant in the Chasseurs-a-Cheval Regiment of the Consular Guard. He fought with distinction at the Battle of Marengo (14 June 1800). On 26 October 1800 he was promoted to Captain.

On 6 June 1805 he was promoted to Major, and became an aide to Prince Eugène de Beauharnais. He participated in the Italian campaigns of 1805-06. On 20 August 1808 he was appointed Colonel of the 9th Chasseurs-a-Cheval Regiment. He participated in the 1809 campaign in Italy and Austria. He was wounded at Raab. He was again made an aide to Prince Eugene on 10 July 1809. He participated in the 1812 campaign in Russia. He was wounded at the crossing of the Dvina and sent to the hospital at Vilna. He was taken prisoner there in December 1812.

Delacroix returned to France after Napoleon abdicated in 1814 and was placed on the non-active list. On 10 March 1815 he was made honorary Brigadier-General. He was allowed to retire on 2 March 1816. He died in Bordeaux on 30 December 1845.

== Honors ==
Delacroix received the following honors:

- 14 June 1804: Knight’s cross of the Legion of Honour
- 19 December 1807: Officer of the Legion of Honor
- 15 August 1809: Baron of the Empire
- 15 August 1812: Commander of the Legion of Honor
- 26 October 1814: Knight’s cross of the Royal and Military Order of Saint-Louis
