= Adrien Recurt =

French medical doctor and minister

Adrien Barnabé Athanase Recurt
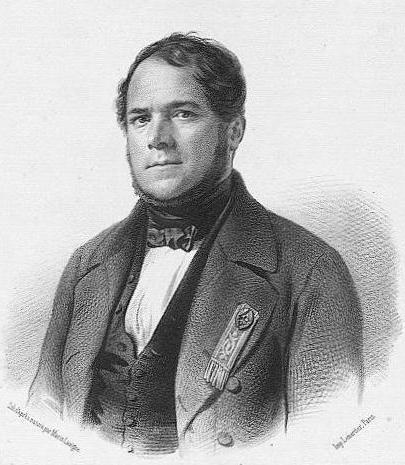
- Portrait from Assemblée nationale. Galerie des représentants du peuple, 1848
- Born: 9 June 1798; Lassales, Hautes-Pyrénées, France
- Died: 7 November 1872 (aged 74); Lévignac, Haute-Garonne, France
- Occupation: Doctor
- Known for: Minister of the Interior

Adrien Barnabé Athanase Recurt (9 June 1798 – 7 November 1872) was a French medical doctor who became a representative in the Constituent Assembly of the French Second Republic, Minister of the Interior and then Minister of Public Works.

== Early years ==
Adrien Barnabé Athanase Recurt was born in Lassales, Hautes-Pyrénées, on 9 June 1798. He studied medicine and qualified as a doctor in Montpellier in 1822. He moved to Paris in the last years of the Restoration, and established himself as a doctor in the Faubourg Saint-Antoine. He threw himself into the struggles of the liberal cause, aligned himself with the Charbonnerie and was involved in various plots.

After fighting on the barricades in July 1830 he remained with the opposition, and soon became a leading member of the Republican party. He was implicated in the affair of April 1834 but was acquitted by the court of peers. On the eve of the February Revolution of 1848 he signed the manifesto calling for the whole nation to become part of the National Guard, and for the army to no longer be used in suppressing disorder.

== Second republic ==
After the revolution had succeeded Recurt was named Deputy Mayor of Paris. On 23 April 1848 he was elected representative to the Constituent Assembly for the Hautes-Pyrenees. He was appointed Minister of the Interior on 11 May 1848. On 15 May 1848 he was chosen one of the vice-presidents of the Assembly. That day he tried to prevent the invasion of the Assembly by a mob. He submitted a double bill to the Assembly prohibiting any armed meeting or association, and extending the ban from French territory to Louis Philippe and his family.

In June 1848 Recurt contributed to the repression of the riots, and personally helped the attack on the Faubourg Saint-Antoine. On 28 June 1848 he received the portfolio of Public Works in the ministry of General Louis-Eugène Cavaignac. He resigned this position on 15 October 1848 and on 25 October 1848 was appointed prefect of the Seine. He resigned from this office after the election as President of Louis-Napoleon Bonaparte, and from then on played an insignificant role in the Assembly.

== Last years ==
Recurt was not reelected to the Legislative Assembly, and returned to his profession as a doctor. He retired to the south of France shortly before his death. He died in Lévignac, Haute-Garonne, on 7 November 1872.
