= Achille Tenaille de Vaulabelle =

French journalist and politician

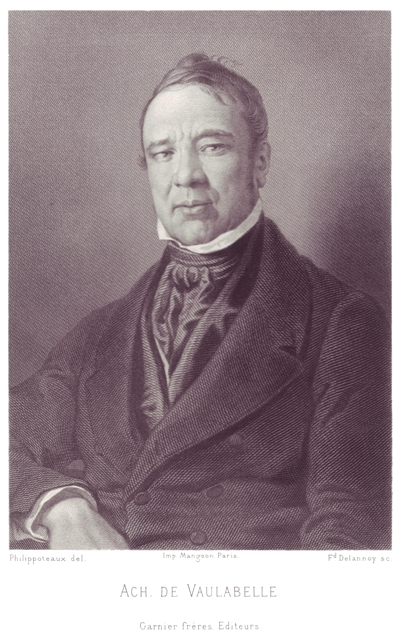
- Born: 28 October 1799; Châtel-Censoir, Yonne, France
- Died: 27 March 1879 (aged 79); Nice, Alpes-Maritimes, France
- Occupations: Journalist and politician

Achille Tenaille de Vaulabelle (28 October 1799 – 27 March 1879) was a French journalist and politician.

== Early years ==
The family of Tenaille de Vaulabelle originated in Clamecy, Nièvre, and became one of the main families of Châtel-Censoir. Jean-Baptiste Tenaille de Vaulabelle was killed by the crowd while defending the queen Marie-Antoinette in Versailles. Achille de Vaulabelle was his nephew. and Éléonore Tenaille de Vaulabelle his brother.

Achille Tenaille de Vaulabelle was born in Châtel-Censoir, Yonne, on 28 October 1799. He joined the administration under the Bourbon Restoration as an attaché to the cabinet of the office of the Prefect of the Yonne. He then went to Paris and became a journalist. In 1824 he published Le Nain jaune (Yellow Dwarf) and founded the liberal newspaper Pour et le Contre (Pro and Con). After the July Revolution this became the Révolution de 1830. He was chief editor of the Messager. He worked at the National in 1838. He published the Modern history of Egypt (1835) and History of the Restorations (1844).

The eight volumes of his Histoire des deux Restaurations (1844–1874), covering the Bourbon restoration in France 1814–1830, met with immediate and permanent success. His large history has been the most widely read study of the Restoration, and provided the facts used by most textbooks and popular accounts. His style is elegant, lively, with anecdotes, dialogues, and quotations. Long passages from key documents are included. His hatred of the monarchy shapes every chapter.

== Second Republic ==
After the February Revolution, Alphonse de Lamartine offered Vaulabelle the embassy in London, then that in Berlin, which he refused. On 23 April 1848 he was elected to represent Yonne in the Constituent Assembly. He was a member of the Constitution Committee and chair of the Committee of Public Instruction. On 6 July 1848 he was appointed Minister of Public Instruction. Vaulabelle reorganized the inspections service and gave more importance to the study of history and modern languages.

Vaulabelle resigned on 13 October 1848. After the presidential election of 10 December 1848 he joined the opposition. He was not re-elected to the Legislative Assembly and left politics. He devoted the rest of his life to his historical works. He died in Nice, Alpes-Maritimes, on 27 March 1879.

== Works ==
- 1815, Ligny-Waterloo, par A. de Vaulabelle,... 40 gravures par J. Worms, d'après les documents authent, undated,112p., Garnier frères, Paris
- Campagne et bataille de Waterloo, d'après de nouveaux renseignemens et des documens complètement iné, 1845, 219p., Perrotin, Paris
- École d'administration. [Modalités et date du concours d'admission pour l'année scolaire 1848-1849, 1848, 12p., impr. de P. Dupont, Paris
- Histoire des deux Restaurations, jusqu'à la chute de Charles X, en 1830, précédée d'un Précis historique, 1844–1854, 7vol., Perrotin (1ère édition), Paris
- Histoire des deux Restaurations jusqu'à l'avènement de Louis-Philippe, de janvier 1813 à octobre 1830, 1855–1856, 8vol., Perrotin (3ème édition), Paris
- Histoire scientifique et militaire de l’expédition française en Égypte, précédée d’une introduction présentant un tableau de l’Égypte ancienne et moderne, dédié au roi, avec Louis Reybaud, 10 vol., Paris, 1836
- Le retour de l'île d'Elbe, 1873, 93p., Lachaud et Burdin, Paris
- Nouveau système de haras, présenté par les éditeurs du Journal des haras, à M. le Ministre de l'Int, 1830, 22p., impr. de Decourchant, Paris
