= Antoine Sénard =

French politician and lawyer

Antoine Marie Jules Sénard
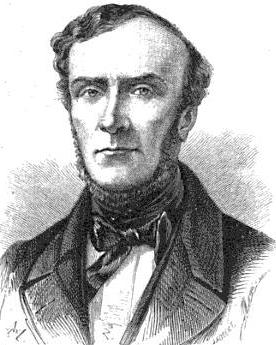
- Portrait from Victor Duruy, Histoire populaire contemporaine de la France (1865)
- Born: 9 April 1800
- Died: 29 October 1885 (aged 85)
- Occupation: Politician
- Known for: President of the French Constituent Assembly (1848)

Antoine Marie Jules Sénard (9 April 1800 – 29 October 1885) was a French lawyer and politician who was briefly President of the Constituent Assembly of the French Second Republic. After returning to private practice during the Second French Empire he successfully defended Gustave Flaubert in an action against his Madame Bovary.

== Early years ==
Antoine Sénard was born in Rouen on 9 April 1800, the son of an architect. He studied at the lycée of Rouen. He qualified as an advocate in Paris, and at the age of 19 was admitted to the bar at Rouen. He performed brilliantly at the court of assizes, and opposed the senior branch on the ordinances of July 1830. However, he soon opposed the government of Louis Philippe of France. On 24 December 1847 he presided over the reform banquet at Rouen.

== Second Republic ==
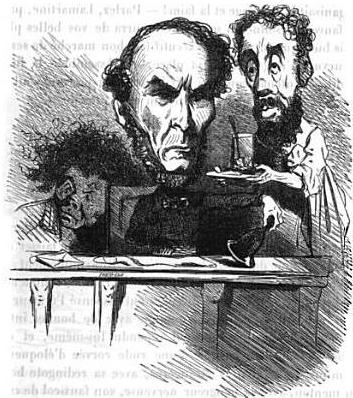
Caricature of Antoine Sénard (center) and Joseph Degousée (right) by Cham

Sénard was named Attorney General of Rouen by the provisional government in March 1848. He resigned this position and ran successfully for election on 23 April 1848 to represent Seine-Inférieure in the Constituent Assembly. When disturbances broke out in Rouen he returned, having not yet been replaced as Attorney General, and was able to restore the peace. Up to one hundred insurgents died, and several hundred were arrested. Sénard returned to Paris and was appointed to the Labor committee.

Sénard was President of the Assembly from 5 to 29 June 1848, replacing Philippe Buchez, who was considered deposed after the disturbances in the Assembly of 15 May 1848. He organized the support of the Assembly for General Louis-Eugène Cavaignac, and was appointed Minister of the Interior on 25 June 1848. In this position he attempted to reorganize the administration. His attempts to make Cavaignac the official candidate in the December 1848 presidential elections caused a cabinet crisis. He resigned on 13 October 1848 and went into opposition when Louis Napoleon was elected President on 10 December 1848. He was not reelected for the Legislative Assembly, and was enrolled in the bar of Paris.

== Second Empire ==
Sénard defended Gustave Flaubert and Léon Laurent-Pichat from charges of damaging public morals by writing and publishing Madame Bovary, and won their acquittal in 1857. Flaubert later dedicated an edition of Madame Bovary to Sénard.

== Third Republic ==
After the Franco-Prussian War began, on 4 September 1870 the Government of National Defense sent Sénard on a mission to Florence to obtain support for France in Italy, and to seek clarification on the separatist movement that seemed to be planned for Nice. He formally congratulated King Victor Emmanuel on the occupation of Rome by Piedmontese troops and the unification of Italy, but did not obtain satisfaction on the question of Nice.

Sénard ran unsuccessfully for election to the National Assembly for the Seine-Inférieure in the elections of 8 February 1871. He was elected mayor of Saint-Cloud in May 1871. On 18 October 1874 he ran for election as representative for the department of Seine-et-Oise, and was elected. He sat on the left. Sénard did not run for election on 20 February 1876, but was elected on 14 October 1877 for the first district of Pontoise. After a Republican majority was elected to the Senate in January 1879, he was appointed Vice-President of the House on 24 May 1879. He lost the election of 21 August 1881. He died in Paris on 29 October 1885.
