= Jules Bastide =

French politician (1800–1879)

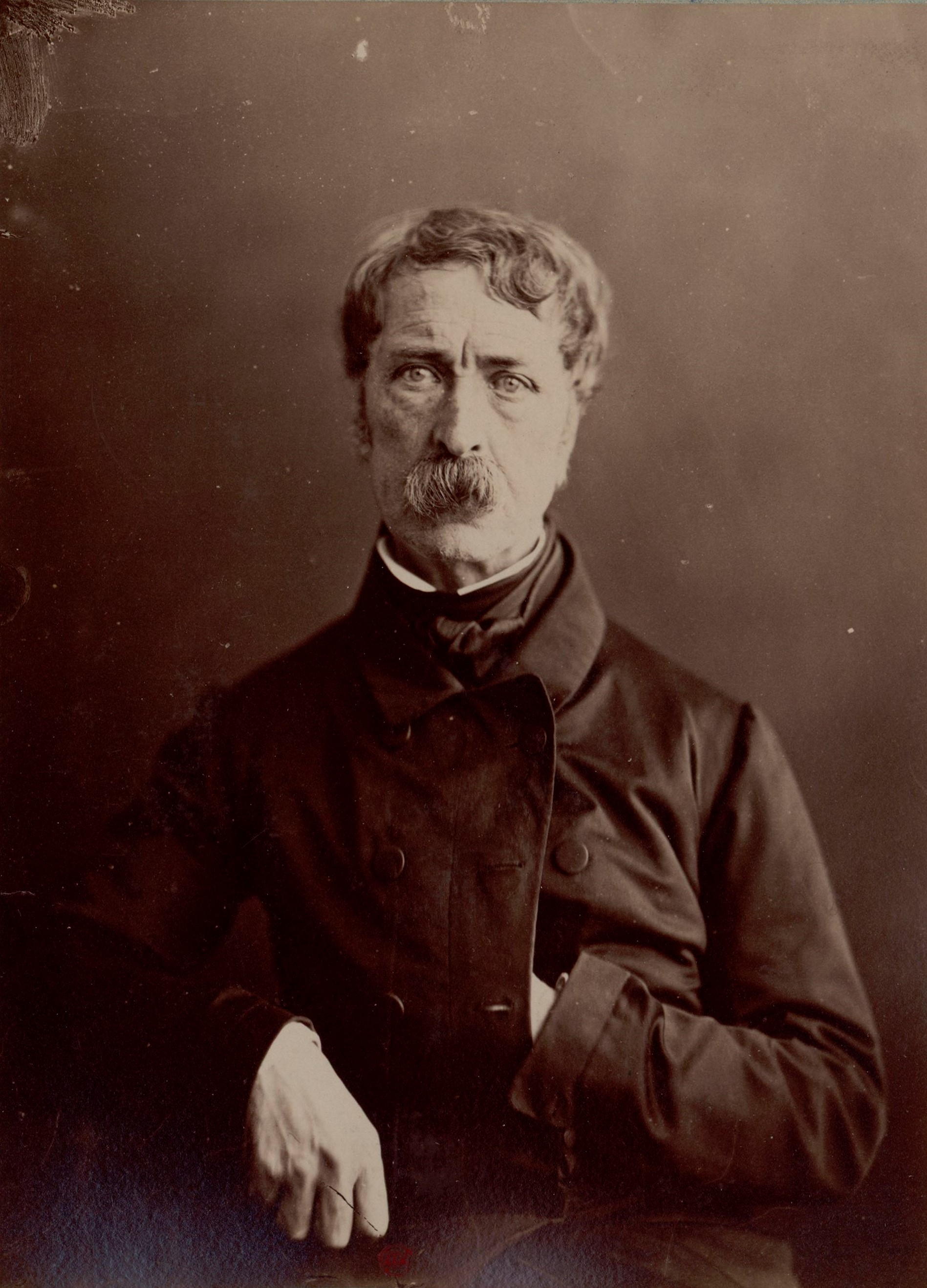
Jules Bastide by Nadar

Jules Bastide (French pronunciation: [ʒyl bastid]; 22 November 1800, in Paris, France – 2 March 1879) was a French politician, journalist and writer.

== Lawyer and revolutionary ==
Bastide studied law for a time, and was afterward engaged in business as a timber merchant. In 1821, he became a member of the French Charbonnerie, modelled after the Italian revolutionary organization Carbonari, and took a prominent part in the Revolution of 1830. After the Revolution he received an artillery command in the National Guard under the new July Monarchy. For his part in the Paris Uprising of 1832 on the occasion of the funeral of General Maximilien Lamarque, Bastide was sentenced to death, but escaped to London.

== Journalist and statesman ==
On his return to Paris in 1834, Bastide was acquitted. He occupied himself with journalism, and he contributed to the National, a republican journal of which he became editor in 1836. In 1847, he founded the Revue Nationale as a collaborative venture with Philippe Buchez, whose ideas had thoroughly infected Bastide. After the Revolution of February 1848, Bastide's intimate knowledge of foreign affairs gained for him a ministerial post in the provisional government, and, after the creation of the Executive Commission, he was made Minister of Foreign Affairs. At the close of 1848 he resigned his portfolio, and, after the December 1851 coup d'état retired into private life.

== Works ==
His writings include:

- De l'éducation publique en France (1847)
- Histoire de l'assemblée législative (1847)
- La République française et l'Italie en 1848 (1858)
- Histoire des guerres religieuses en France (1859)

== See also ==
- French demonstration of 15 May 1848
