= Demonstration of 15 May 1848 =

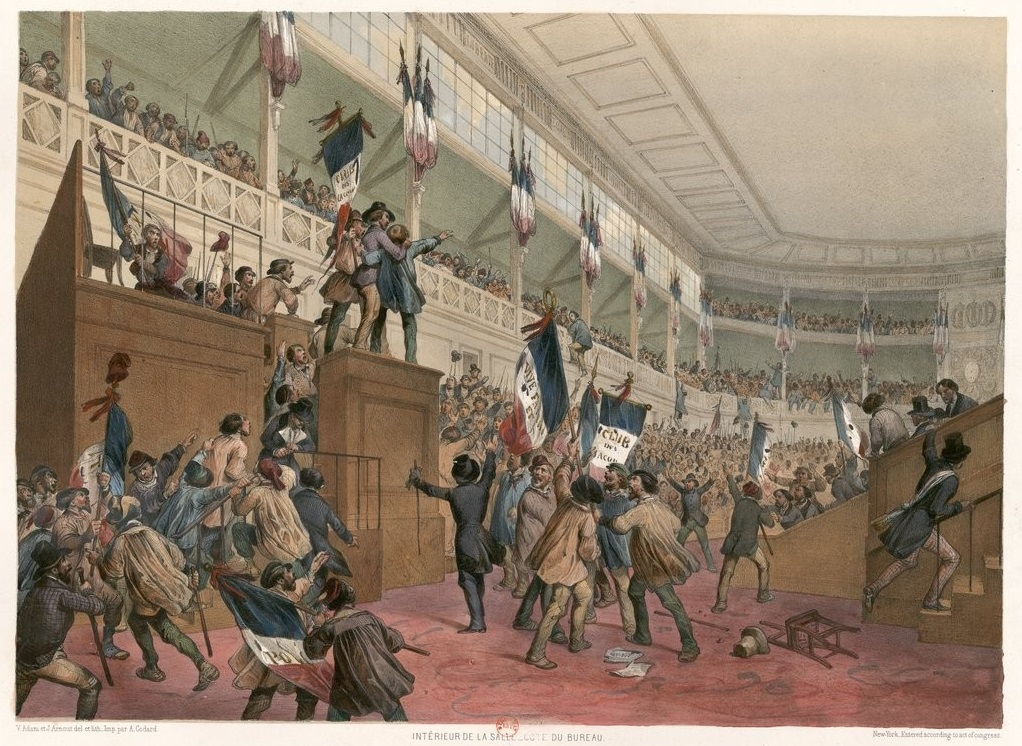
Illustration by Victor Adam and Louis-Jules Arnout, 1848

The French demonstration of 15 May 1848 was an event played out, mostly, in the streets of Paris. It was intended to reverse the results of a Second Republic election of deputies to the Constituent Assembly. It is difficult to say, with any precision, whether this phenomenon should be called a demonstration, a riot, an invasion, a rebellion, or an attempted coup d'état. Nonetheless, it seems to have been largely unplanned, not particularly bloody, and indisputably a failure.

== Context ==
The election results of 23 April 1848, which chose deputies to serve in the national Constituent Assembly, were very unfavorable to republican progressives, a party that held strong socialistic views such as wanting the government to be the "supreme regulator of production" and led by the "utopian socialist" Louis Blanc. Universal male suffrage, applied for the first time since 1792, resulted in the election of an Assembly with a majority composed of a group calling themselves "tomorrow's republicans". A new government was elected by the Assembly, called the Commission exécutive de la République française (executive committee of the French Republic), which was composed largely of moderate Republicans who were opposed to the socialistic agenda enacted by the provisional government that had been in place since the February 1848 revolution.

Once assembled, the deputies tried to insulate themselves from the inevitable popular pressure engendered by meeting in Paris. Nonetheless, on 10 May, the new assembly spurned the proposal of Louis Blanc concerning the establishment of a "Ministry of Labor and Progress", a bold measure that aimed to implement Blanc's socialist agenda. Blanc was opposed to the free markets and market competition and wanted the "Ministry of Labor and Progress" to establish communal "workshops" in various industries that all supported each other. The goal was to have government backed labor "workshops" so everyone could have a job and make government the "supreme regulator of production". Blanc claimed that "in destroying competition we strangle at the same time the evils which it brings forth", to which Blanc believed would lead to the downfall of capitalism. The urban laborers behind Blanc were unnerved by the measures taken against him. On 12 May, the Assembly banned political parties and special-interest groups from sending delegations to read petitions to the Assembly, an old practice from revolutionary Paris (1792–1794) and the so-called Sans-culottes, which had been resumed in February 1848. This action was seen by Parisians as undemocratic.

The progressives in the Assembly were also unhappy about the inaction of the Department of Foreign Affairs and its provisional minister, Jules Bastide, who refused to help the Poles then under the occupation of Prussian and Austrian troops. The newly elected government, it seemed, was only continuing the foreign policy of the provisional government, a timid and feckless platform, which, under the leadership of Alphonse de Lamartine, had, on 4 March, passed a resolution denying support to all popular revolutions (in Italy, Poland, Germany, and elsewhere in Europe.) The progressive Republicans had difficulty in understanding this passivity when, within human memory, France had been a "great nation" which marched to the aid of those "oppressed by their rulers". This was the standard of greatness established by the Revolution of 1792, and many 1848 progressives found France's current passivity painfully disconcerting.

== Event ==
A ceremony of flags had been scheduled for 14 May 1848, and Paris was full of National Guards, many from the provinces. The ceremony had been suddenly canceled because of the refusal of the delegation of workers sitting in the Luxembourg Palace to participate in the ceremony. Delegates from Poland (specifically, Poznań and Lemberg, now known as Lviv) prevailed upon a sympathetic deputy from the department of the Seine, a naturalized Pole, Louis Wolowski, to have the Assembly discuss the Polish question on 15 May. Also on 15 May, Parisian militants, mostly progressive Republicans and socialists, held a demonstration in support of the Polish cause. This happened despite the reluctance of Republican leaders, such as François-Vincent Raspail, Armand Barbès, and Louis Auguste Blanqui, to support it.

The event started at the Bastille and headed through the boulevards toward the Place de la Concorde, at the western end of the Tuileries Gardens. Many foreign delegations (Irish, Italian, Polish) participated. Provocative behavior by fiery old revolutionaries, like Aloysius Huber, and a general failure by Courtois, the commander of the National Guard, to respond appropriately caused the situation to degenerate.

Protesters headed for the Palais Bourbon, where the Assembly was meeting, and forced their way into the chamber. In the hubbub, someone read the petition in favor of Poland. Then Aloysius Huber exclaimed: "The National Assembly is dissolved." The crowd then marched to the City Hall of Paris, where it proclaimed an "insurrectionary government" with Blanqui, Ledru-Rollin, Alexandre Martin, Louis Blanc, Aloysius Huber, Thoré, Pierre Leroux, and Raspail to serve as ministers. Elements of the National Guard, joined by Lamartine, Ledru-Rollin, and members of the five-day-old Executive Committee, besieged the city hall and dislodged the protesters.

== Aftermath ==
The assembly and the executive committee resumed control of the situation. The Republican leaders were arrested. They were brought before the High Court of Justice of Bourges on 7 March to 3 April 1849. Marc Caussidière was dismissed from his position as prefect of police, and he was replaced by a banker from Le Mans, Ariste Jacques Trouvé-Chauvel. General de Courtois, commandant of the National Guard of Paris, who had shown some sympathy for the protesters, was arrested and replaced by General Clément Thomas. Jules Favre tried in vain to get the Assembly to indict Louis Blanc. Philippe Buchez, who had shown no reaction to the demonstrators, lost the presidency of the Assembly, and he was succeeded by the former attorney, Antoine Sénard. The Conservatives were, after these events, free to carry on the offensive against their great nemesis: the national workshops associated with Louis Blanc.

== See also ==
- List of attacks on legislatures
