= Lassales =

- Commune
- Coat of arms
- Location of Lassales
- Location within France Location within Occitanie
- Coordinates: 43°12′50″N 0°29′17″E
- Country: France
- Region: Occitania
- Department: Hautes-Pyrénées
- Arrondissement: Tarbes
- Canton: Les Coteaux
- Intercommunality: Pays de Trie et du Magnoac

Government
  - Mayor (2020–2026): Michel Mole
- Area^{1}: 2.52 km^{2} (0.97 sq mi)
- Elevation: 365 m (1,198 ft)
- Highest elevation: 508 m (1,667 ft)
- Lowest elevation: 358 m (1,175 ft)
- Population (2023): 35
  - Density: 14/km^{2} (36/sq mi)
- Time zone: UTC+01:00 (CET)
  - Summer (DST): UTC+02:00 (CEST)
- INSEE/Postal code: 65266 /65670
- ^{1} French Land Register data, which excludes lakes, ponds, glaciers > 1 km^{2} (0.386 sq mi or 247 acres) and river estuaries.

Lassales (French pronunciation: [lasal]; Occitan: Eras Salas) is a commune in the Hautes-Pyrénées department in south-western France.

== See also ==
- Communes of the Hautes-Pyrénées department
