= Charles-François Delacroix =

French statesman (1741–1805)

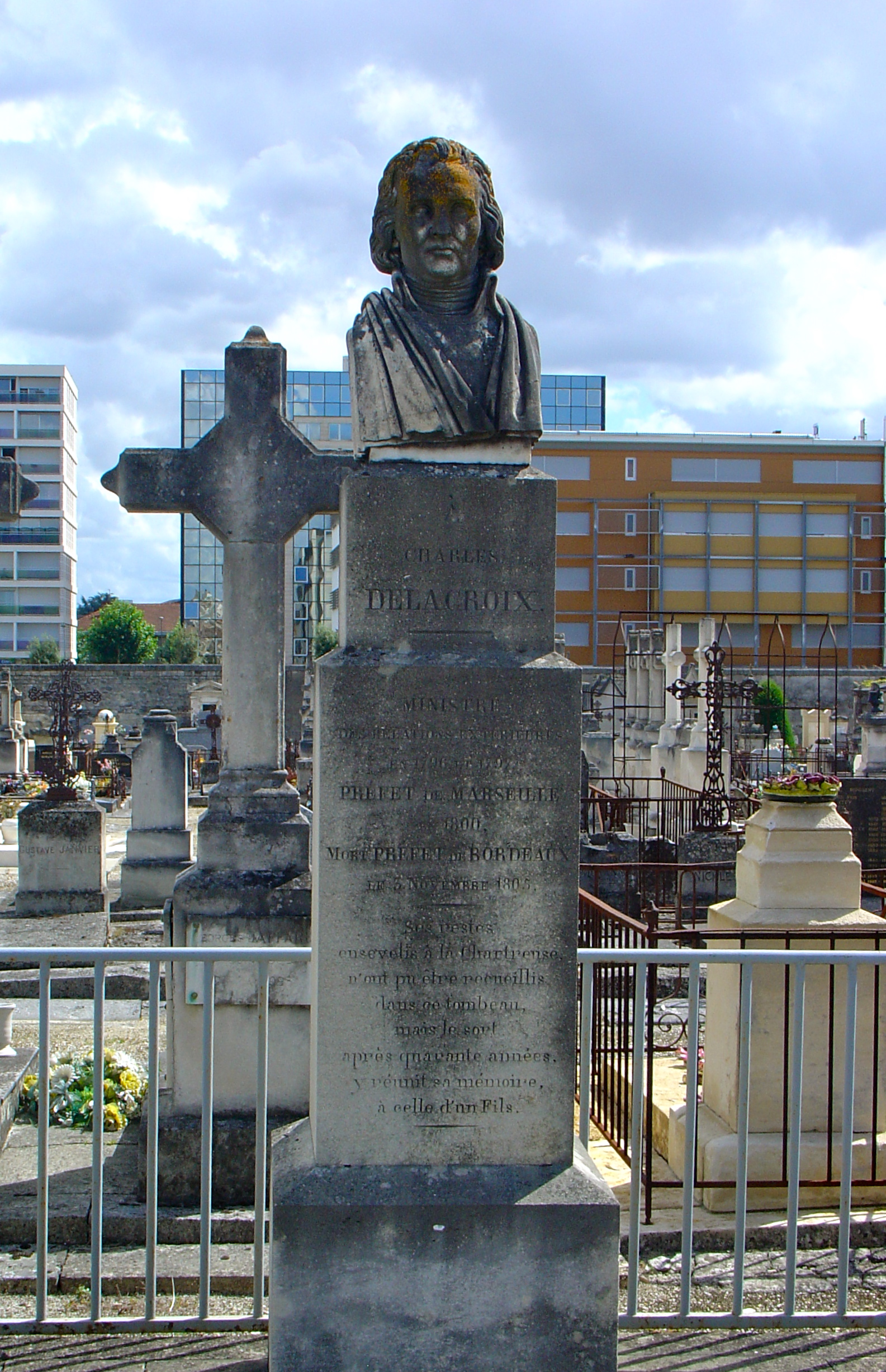
- A bust of Charles-Francois in Bordeaux

Minister of Foreign Affairs
- In office 3 November 1795 – 16 July 1797
- Preceded by: Jean-Victor Colchen
- Succeeded by: Charles Maurice de Talleyrand-Périgord

Personal details
- Born: 15 April 1741 Givry-en-Argonne, Kingdom of France
- Died: 26 October 1805 (aged 64) Bordeaux, French Empire
- Occupation: Statesman

Charles-François Delacroix (French pronunciation: [ʃaʁl fʁɑ̃swa dəlakʁwa]; or Lacroix; 15 April 1741 – 26 October 1805) was a French statesman who became Minister of Foreign Affairs under the Directory. The painter Eugène Delacroix was his fourth child, although doubts have been cast on his paternity.

== Early life ==
Charles-François Delacroix was born in Givry-en-Argonne on 15 April 1741. He married Victoire Oëbène, daughter of the cabinet-maker Jean-François Oeben. Victoire's uncle Henri-François Riesener was a distinguished painter. They had four children. Charles-Henri Delacroix (9 January 1779 – 30 December 1845) became a soldier, and rose to the rank of General in the Napoleonic army. Henriette was born in 1780. She married the diplomat Raymond de Verninac Saint-Maur (1762–1822). Henri was born six year later. He was killed at the Battle of Friedland on 14 June 1807. The youngest child was the future painter Eugène Delacroix (1798–1863).

When Eugène was born the gossip in Paris had it that Delacroix had been succeeded in his bed by the man who had succeeded him at his desk, Maurice de Talleyrand. On 13 September 1797, the surgeon Imbert-Delonnes removed a "monstrous tumor" of twenty-eight pounds, in which were tangled "the most delecate masculine organs". The tumor apparently would have rendered him impotent. Whatever the truth, it seems certain that Charles was sent away to the Hague to avoid the gossip.

== Career ==
Delacroix was secretary to Anne-Robert-Jacques Turgot (1727–1781), Minister of Finance during the reign of Louis XVI. During the French Revolution (1789–1799), he became a deputy to the National Convention and voted for the death of the king. Delacroix and Georges Danton interrogated Dumouriez, who was accused in March 1793 in Belgium dealing with the Austrians without permission of the Convention. In 1793 Delacroix proposed to the Convention to confiscate the metal statuary at Versailles and melt it down to make cannon. The proposal was rejected after some debate.

Delacroix joined the Thermidorian Reaction. He was appointed French Minister of Foreign Affairs between 3 November 1795 and 15 July 1797 before being replaced by Talleyrand. On 2 December 1797 he became a special envoy (ambassador) to the Batavian Republic. In January 1798 he advised Herman Willem Daendels in his coup d'état against a group of federalists in the Dutch National Convention. In 1799, he became the first prefect in the Bouches-du-Rhône and in 1803 in the Gironde.

Delacroix died in Bordeaux on 26 October 1805. When his wife, Victoire Oeben, died in 1814 it was found that his family estate was fully mortgaged, and his attorney had been stealing from it. Rather than being worth 800,000 francs as thought, the estate was in debt by 175,000 francs.

A monument to Delacroix stands in the Chartreuse cemetery in Bordeaux.
