= Eugène Bethmont =

French politician (1804–1860)

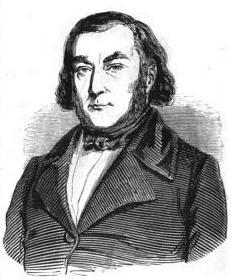
- Portrait from Journées illustrées de la Révolution de 1848, Paris, 1849.
- Born: 12 March 1804; Paris, France
- Died: 1 April 1860 (aged 56); Paris, France
- Occupation: Politician
- Known for: Minister of Justice

Eugène Bethmont (12 March 1804 – 1 April 1860) was a French politician. He was a deputy from 1842 to 1848, a representative in the Constituent Assembly of 1848, and Minister of Justice in the Cabinet of General Cavaignac (28 June 1848 to 20 December 1848).

== Early years ==
Eugène Bethmont was born in Paris on 12 March 1804, son of a baker in the rue du Pont aux choux, in Le Marais. He was educated by the Oratorians of the College of Juilly, who greatly admired his talent. His family suffered financial difficulties, and at first he devoted himself to teaching. He soon began studying law, and was admitted to the bar in 1827. He appeared at the palace the next year, and gained a great reputation by arguing several cases at the Court of Assizes.

== July monarchy ==
After the July Revolution of 1830 Eugène Bethmont was open about his liberal views. He often defended writers for the opposition, including journalists of Caricature and Charivari. He was involved in most of the major political trials of the era.

On 8 July 1842 he was elected to the Chamber of Deputies for the 8th district of Paris. He took his place among the leading opposition speakers. In the 1842-46 session his was particularly involved in questions of political economy and public works. He spoke out against electoral corruption. In the elections of 1 August 1846 the ministry strongly opposed his reelection and managed to engineer his defeat. However, he was elected for the first college of Charente-Inférieure (La Rochelle) in a by-election on 10 October 1846. He rejoined the opposition and in February 1848 was a signatory to the proposed impeachment of the ministry of François Guizot.

== Second republic ==
After the February Revolution the provisional government named Bethmont interim Minister of Commerce on 24 February 1848. On 23 April 1848 he was elected to the Constituent Assembly as representative for Indre. He became minister of Religious Affairs in the ministry of 11 May 1848 formed by the Executive Commission. On 28 June 1848 he was appointed Minister of Justice by General Cavaignac, president of the council and head of the executive. Due to his poor health and the stress of office he was forced to resign on 3 November 1848. On 11 April 1849 he was elected as a State Councillor, holding this position until 2 December 1851.

Bethmont joined his colleagues in protesting the coup d'état of 2 December 1851. He took refuge with his friend, M. Bugnet, a professor at the law school, to avoid arrest. He returned to the bar, and held no government office after this. He died in Paris on 1 April 1860.
