= Alexandre Pierre Freslon =

French lawyer and minister

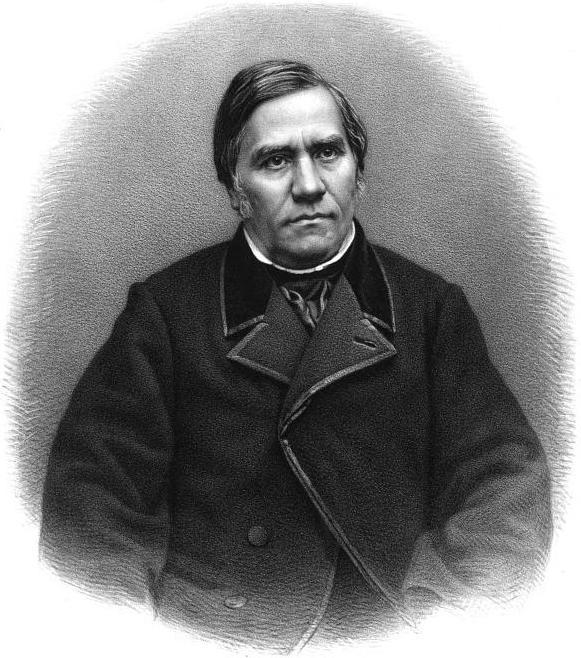
- Portrait from Panthéon des illustrations françaises au XIXe siècle, Paris, c. 1865.
- Born: 11 May 1808; La Flèche, Sarthe, France
- Died: 26 January 1867 (aged 58)

Alexandre Pierre Freslon (11 May 1808 – 26 January 1867) was a French Lawyer who became a representative in the Constituent Assembly and Minister of Public Education and Religion in 1848.

== Early years ==
Alexandre Pierre Freslon was born in La Flèche, Sarthe, on 11 May 1808 to a family of farmers. He studied law at the Faculty of Paris and entered the Bar in Angers in 1829. He held Liberal views, and on 17 July 1830 was prosecuted for participating in a demonstration against the government. He defended himself and was acquitted.

After the July Revolution Freslon entered the judiciary as a crown prosecutor. However, he did not approve of the new government and in 1832 resigned and resumed has career as a lawyer. In 1839 he founded the Précurseur de l'Ouest, a Republican newspaper. He became a member of the council of Angers. He fought the mayor of Angers, denouncing him in his paper for corruption in 1846 and earning a fine of 100 francs.

== Second Republic ==
On 2 March 1848 the Provisional Government appointed Freslon Attorney General of the Angers Court of Appeals. On 23 April 1848 he was elected to the Constituent Assembly as representative for Maine-et-Loire. He was a member of the legislative committee. He aligned himself with the moderate Republicans and General Louis-Eugène Cavaignac.

On 13 October 1848 Cavaignac appointed Freslon Minister for Public Education and Religious Affairs. He left this position on 19 December 1848 after Louis-Napoleon Bonaparte was elected president. He was not re-elected to the Legislative Assembly on 8 July 1849. On 25 August 1849 Bonaparte appointed him Advocate General at the Court of Cassation.

== Later career ==
Freslon did not support the coup d'état of 2 December 1851 and returned to private practice as a lawyer in Paris. On 1 June 1863 Freslon ran as an independent candidate for the 2nd District of Maine-et-Loire in the Legislative Assembly, but was soundly defeated. He died in Paris on 26 January 1867. He was aged 58.
