= Henri de Verninac-Saint-Maur =

French politician

Henri-François-Charles de Verninac de Saint-Maur
- Born: 18 May 1841; Rochechouart, Haute-Vienne, France
- Died: 12 May 1901 (aged 59); Baladou, Lot.
- Occupation: Politician
- Known for: Senator

Henri-François-Charles de Verninac de Saint-Maur (18 May 1841 – 12 May 1901) was a French politician who was a Senator from 1883 until his death in 1901.

== Early years ==
Henri-François-Charles de Verninac de Saint-Maur was born at Rochechouart, Haute-Vienne, on 18 May 1841. His father was Raymond-Jean-Baptiste de Verninac Saint-Maur, a naval officer who became Minister of the Navy and Colonies. He studied law and received a doctorate. He was appointed General Councillor of the Lot department. On 8 February 1871 he ran for election to the National Assembly for that department on a Republican ticket, but did not win. He tried again on 20 February 1876 in the Arrondissement of Gourdon, on 14 October 1877 and in 1881, but lost each time.

== Senator ==
On 4 February 1883, Verninac finally succeeded in being elected as Senator for Lot. He sat on the left, and took an active part in the discussion over reforming the magistrature. He was also involved in framing the law on recidivists. He opposed agricultural taxes. He voted in favour of divorce, in favour of the Lisbonne law defining the freedom of the press and in favour of the high court procedure against General Georges Ernest Boulanger.

Charles de Verninac was reelected to the upper house in 1888, and joined the Democratic Left group. He left the republican union in 1891 to form the most progressive group of the democratic left, with Senator Bernard of Doubs. He was president of this group. At this time he became President of the General Council of Lot. He was highly active in the senate, belonging to committees on finance, the army, the navy and railways among others. He was involved in discussions over railway lines, sugar, cargo stowage on ships, public abattoirs and many other subjects. On 12 January 1893 Charles de Verninac was elected alternate member of the Committee of the High Court of Justice. He was secretary of the Finance committee.

Charles de Verninac was reelected to the Senate on 3 January 1897. On 11 July 1898, he was elected vice-president of the Senate by a large majority. He replaced Paul Peytral, who had been appointed Minister of Finance. He was reelected to this position on 12 January 1899, 5 February 1900 and 10 January 1901. As a member of the army committee he often spoke on military problems, and always contributed to budget discussions.

Charles de Verninac was made commander of Agricultural Merit and Knight of the Order of Leopold of Belgium. He died on 12 May 1901, aged 59.

== Bibliography ==
- Charles de Verninac de Saint-Maur (1864). Droit romain : Du Sénatus-consulte velléien. Droit français : De la Condition de la femme mariée. Thèse... par Charles de Verninac,... C. de Mourgues frères.
- Charles de Verninac de Saint-Maur (Henri-François-Charles de.) (13 December 1900). Rapport... (régime des boissons). Impr. de P. Mouillot.
