= Raymond de Verninac Saint-Maur =

French diplomat

- Born: 7 January 1761; Souillac, Lot, France
- Died: 23 April 1822 (aged 61)
- Occupation: Diplomat
- Spouse: Henriette Delacroix (m. 1798)

Raymond de Verninac Saint-Maur (7 January 1761 – 23 April 1822) was a French diplomat.

== Life ==
The Verninac family originated in Gourdon, Lot in the former province of Quercy. Jean de Verninac was a counsellor of the king in Villefranche in 1696. Another family member was vicar-general of Rodez in 1786. Raymond de Verninac Saint-Maur was his nephew.

Raymond de Verninac was one of the three commissioners who were delegated to settle the annexation of Avignon in 1791. He was Minister to Sweden from 1792 until 1793, when Louis XVI was executed and relations were broken off. Raymond Verninac arrived at Constantinople on 12 April 1795 with the title of Envoy of the French Republic. After a month of negotiations, he was accepted on 18 May 1795. He continued until 1797 as French representative to the Porte of the Ottoman Sultan Selim III.

Verninac was not successful in improving relations between the Porte and France, since the Turks were not sympathetic to the recent French Revolution. He did send a commissioner to investigate the state of Egypt, who reported in September 1796 that the Ottoman Empire was in an extreme state of decay and that Egypt could be taken with little effort. On 9 April 1797 Verninac had a long interview with the general Napoleon Bonaparte, who appears to have accepted this view. The idea took hold in Napoleon's mind, and on 16 August 1797 he wrote to the Directory revealing his plan to attack Egypt.

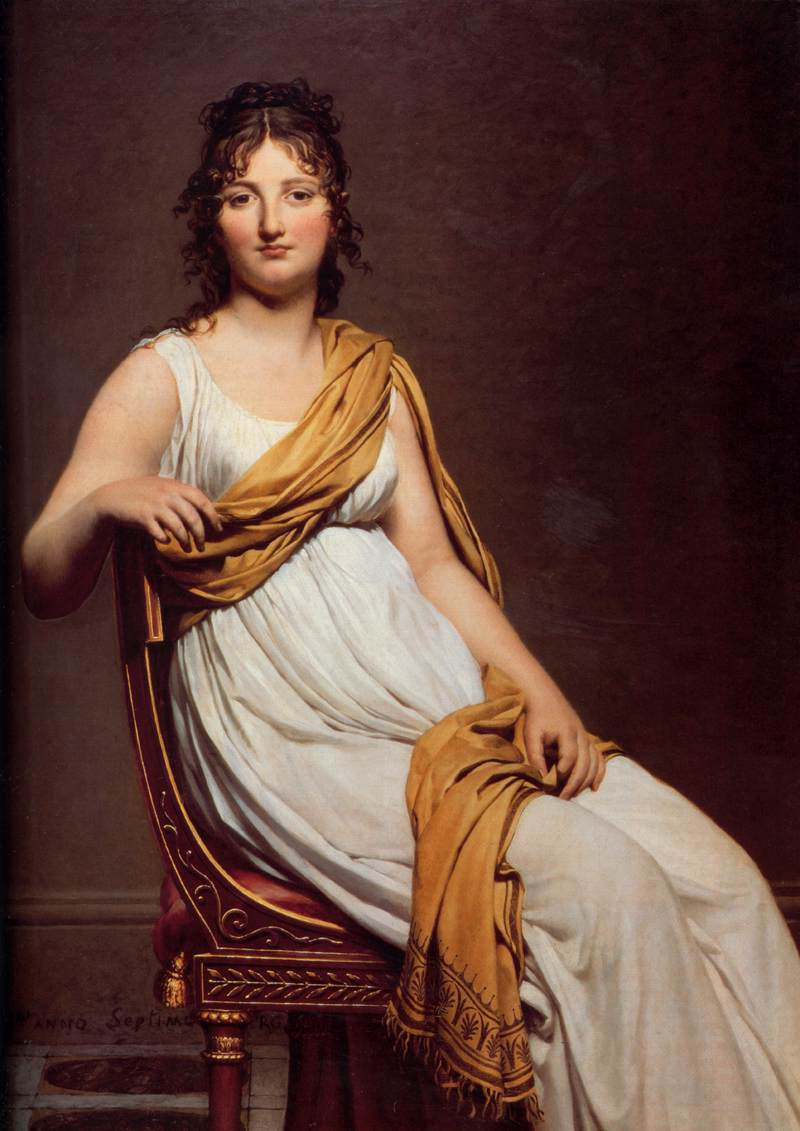
Portrait of Henriette de Verninac by Jacques-Louis David, 1799

In 1798 Raymond de Verninac married Henriette Delacroix, older sister of the future painter Eugène Delacroix. She was the daughter of Charles-François Delacroix (or Lacroix), minister of Foreign Affairs under the Directory. During the Consulate (1799–1804) Verninac was Prefect of the Rhône department. The Verninacs moved to Lyon. From 1802 to 1805 Raymond de Verninac was French representative to Switzerland, after which he retired from the diplomatic service. Charles Étienne Raymond Victor de Verninac was born in Paris on 19 November 1803, the couple's only child.

Raymond de Verninac died on 23 April 1822. His wife was left destitute. His nephew and namesake was the future Admiral Raymond-Jean-Baptiste de Verninac Saint-Maur.
