= Le Nain jaune =

French satirical political journal of liberal tendencies

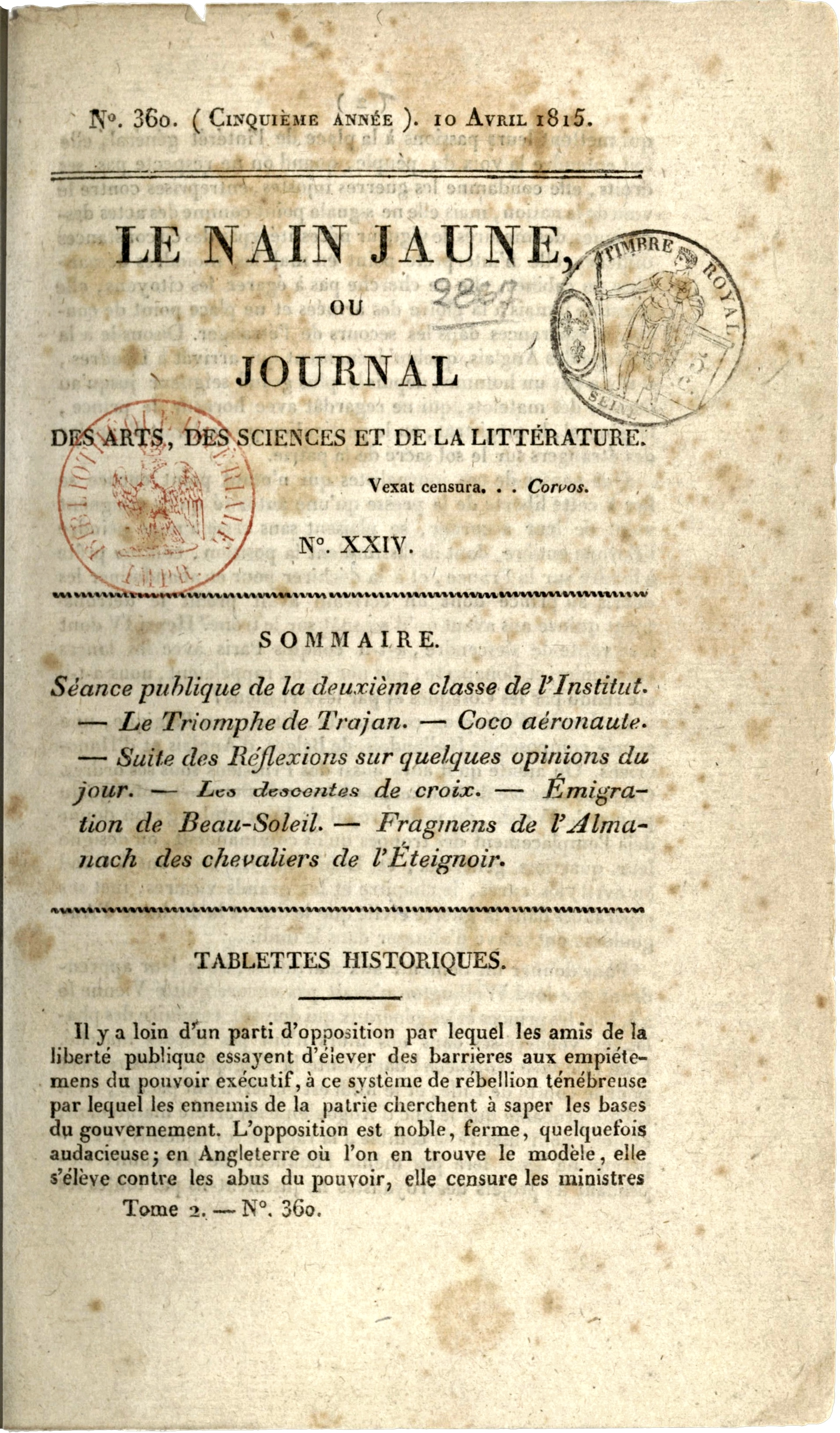
Le Nain jaune journal P1

Le Nain jaune ("The Yellow Dwarf") was a satirical political journal of liberal tendencies, in opposition to the Imperial policies of Napoleon, that was published in Paris, starting in 1814. The magazine ceased publication in 1815. The title was revived in 1863 as a semi-weekly with the subtitle Journal politique et littéraire (meaning "Political and Literary Journal" in English).
