= Givry-en-Argonne =

- Commune
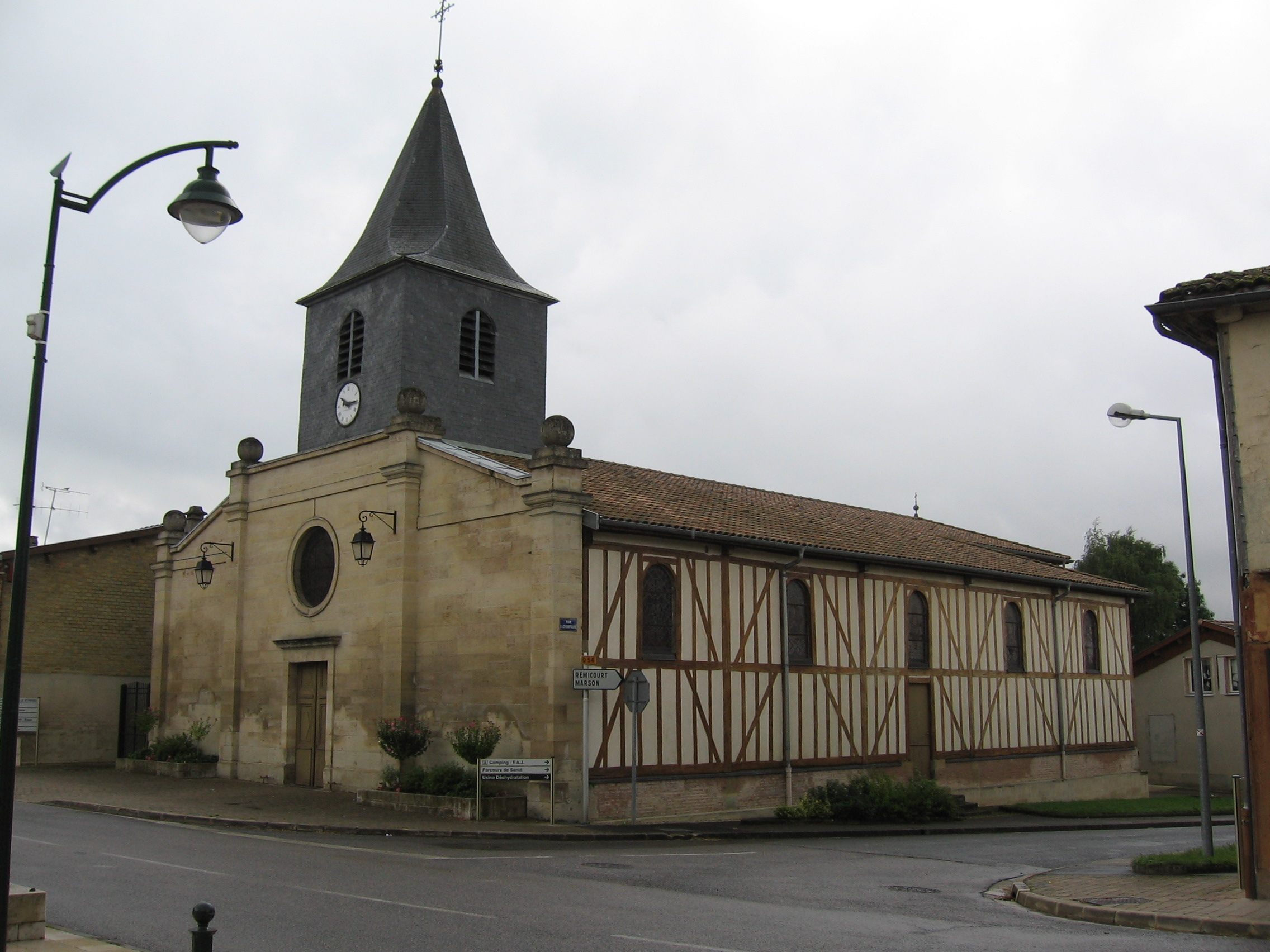
- The church in Givry-en-Argonne

- Coat of arms
- Location of Givry-en-Argonne
- Location within France Location within Grand Est
- Coordinates: 48°57′03″N 4°53′21″E
- Country: France
- Region: Grand Est
- Department: Marne
- Arrondissement: Châlons-en-Champagne
- Canton: Argonne Suippe et Vesle
- Intercommunality: Argonne Champenoise

Government
  - Mayor (2020–2026): Antoine Bourguignon
- Area^{1}: 7.66 km^{2} (2.96 sq mi)
- Elevation: 175 m (574 ft)
- Population (2023): 448
  - Density: 58.5/km^{2} (151/sq mi)
- Time zone: UTC+01:00 (CET)
  - Summer (DST): UTC+02:00 (CEST)
- INSEE/Postal code: 51272 /51330
- ^{1} French Land Register data, which excludes lakes, ponds, glaciers > 1 km^{2} (0.386 sq mi or 247 acres) and river estuaries.

Givry-en-Argonne (French pronunciation: [ʒivʁi ɑ̃.n‿aʁɡɔn], lit. 'Givry in Argonne') is a commune in the Marne department in north-eastern France.

== See also ==
- Communes of the Marne department
