= Henriette de Verninac =

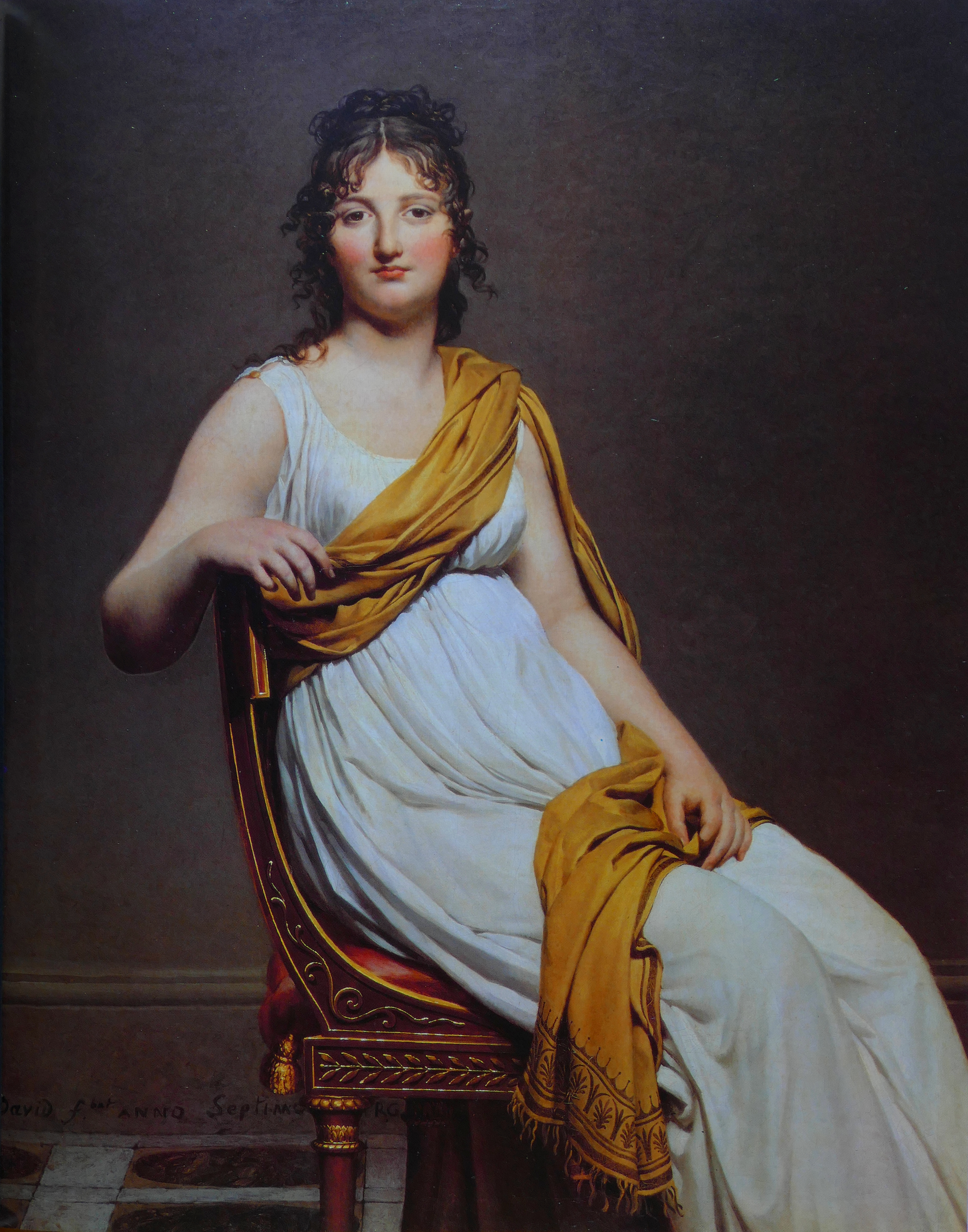
- Portrait of Henriette de Verninac, 1799, by Jacques-Louis David
- Born: 1780
- Died: 1827 (aged 46–47); Paris, France
- Spouse: Raymond de Verninac Saint-Maur (m. 1798; died 1822)
- Father: Charles-François Delacroix
- Relatives: Charles-Henri Delacroix (brother); Eugène Delacroix (brother)

Henriette de Verninac (1780–1827) was the daughter of Charles-François Delacroix, minister of Foreign Affairs under the Directory, and wife of the diplomat Raymond de Verninac Saint-Maur. She is known as the subject of a portrait by Jacques-Louis David.

== Early years ==
Henriette Delacroix was born in 1780. Her parents were Charles-François Delacroix (or Lacroix), minister of Foreign Affairs under the Directory, and Victoire Oeben, daughter of Jean-François Oeben, cabinetmaker to Louis XV. She was the second of four children. Her older brother Charles was a general during the First French Empire. Her second brother was Henri. Her youngest brother was the painter Eugène Delacroix (1798–1863), born eighteen years after her. (Note: It was rumored that Charles-François Delacroix was not the father of Eugène Delacroix, but that his real father was the statesman Charles Maurice de Talleyrand.)

== Marriage ==
In 1798 Henriette married Raymond de Verninac Saint-Maur (1762–1822). He was one of the three commissioners who had been delegated to settle the annexation of Avignon in 1791. Raymond de Verninac was Minister to Sweden from 1792 until 1793, when Louis XVI was executed and relations were broken off. From 1795-97 he was Minister to the Porte of Sultan Selim III.

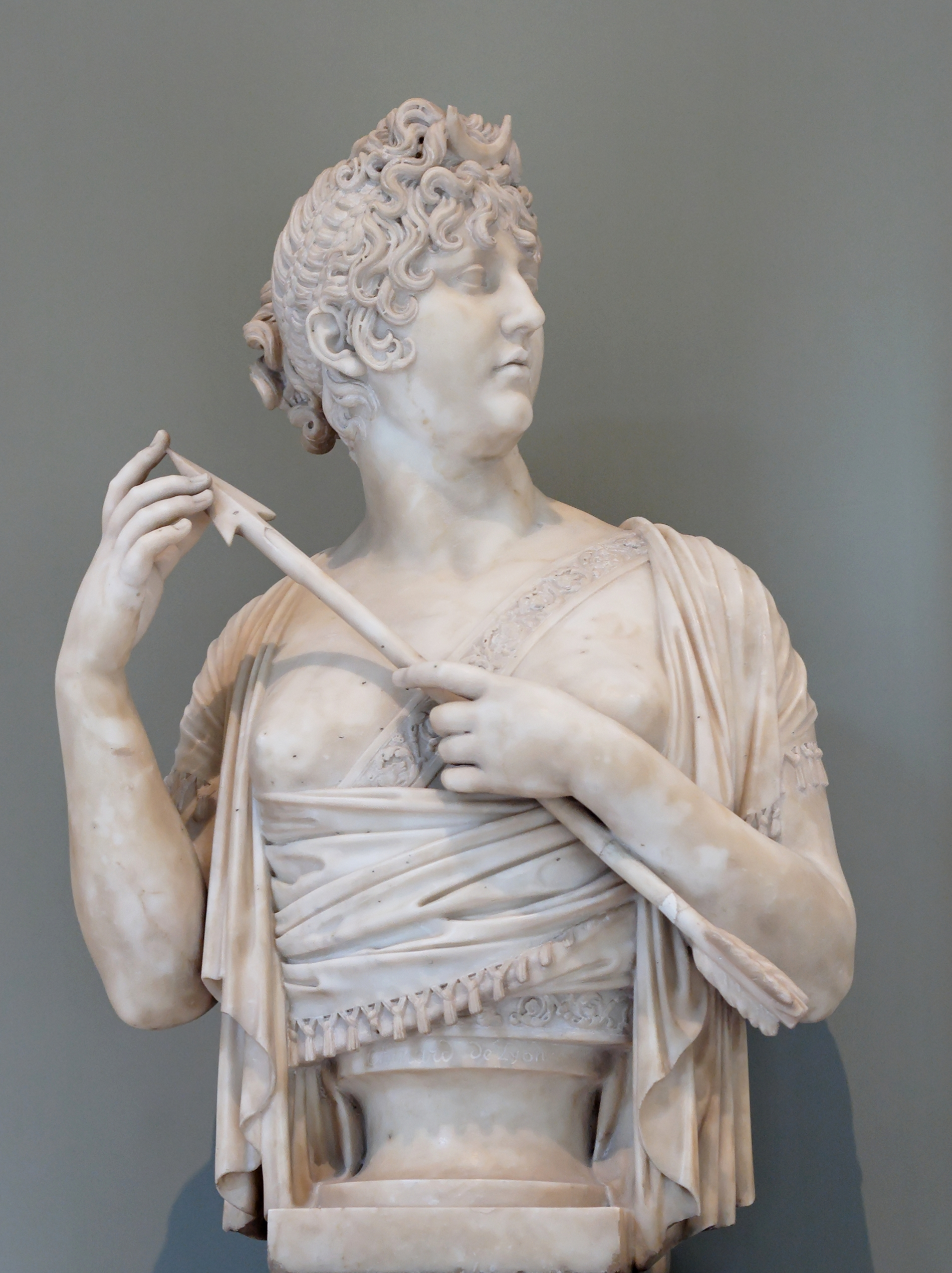
Madame de Verninac as Diana the Huntress, by Joseph Chinard

During the Consulate (1799–1804) Verninac was Prefect of the Rhône department. The Verninacs moved to Lyon. Jacques-Louis David painted a portrait of her in 1799. The sensual painting in neo-classical style depicts Henriette in the classical costume popular during the Directory. In 1808 Joseph Chinard sculpted Henriette as Diana the Huntress Preparing Her Arrows. Both of these works are now held by the Musée du Louvre.

From 1802 to 1805 Raymond de Verninac was French representative to Switzerland, after which he retired from the diplomatic service. Charles Étienne Raymond Victor de Verninac was born in Paris on 19 November 1803, the couple's only child. Henriette's father died in November 1805. Her second brother Henri died in 1807 in the Battle of Friedland. When her mother, Victoire Oeben, died in 1814 it was found that family estate was fully mortgaged, and his attorney had been stealing from it. Rather than being worth 800,000 francs as thought, the estate was in debt by 175,000 francs.

The couple took care of Eugène Delacroix in 1814 after the death of their mother. Delacroix met his first love at Henriette's house. His portrait of the young Englishwoman Elisabeth Salter was painted in 1817. He became attached to his nephew, Charles, who was just five years younger than him. When Charles came to Paris to attend the Lycée Louis-le-Grand, Delacroix acted as his informal guardian.

== Last years ==
Henriette's husband died on 23 April 1822. With the trial over her father's estate not yet settled, Henriette was ruined and forced to work to survive. She offered her services to the house of education of the Legion of Honour. She died in Paris in 1827. Delacroix became owner of the painting by David. He kept it for the rest of his life.

== Sources ==
- "Biographie de VERNINAC Henriette de (1782-1827)". Correspondance d'Eugène Delacroix.
- Fraser, Elizabeth A. (2004). Delacroix, Art and Patrimony in Post-Revolutionary France (PDF). Cambridge University Press. ISBN 0-521-82829-5.
- "Henriette de Verninac (1780–1827)". Musée National Eugène Delacroix. Archived from the original on 2014-03-15.
- Johnson, Lee (1991). "Portrait of Delacroix". Eugène Delacroix (1798-1863): Paintings, Drawings, and Prints from North American Collections. Metropolitan Museum of Art. ISBN 978-0-8109-6403-7.
- Johnson, Lee (1991b). Eugène Delacroix, further correspondence, 1817-1863. Oxford University Press. ISBN 978-0-19-817395-3.
- Lubbock, Tom (25 September 2009). "Great Works: Henriette de Verninac (1799) Jacques-Louis David". The Independent.
- Madame de Verninac sous les attributs de Diane charesse préparant ses traits; née Anne, Françoise, Victoire, Henriette Delacroix (1780-1827), épouse de Raymond de Verninac Saint-Maur (in French), Ministère de la Culture
- "Madame Raymond de Verninac". The Louvre. 1798.
- Néret, Gilles (2000). Delacroix. Taschen. ISBN 978-3-8228-5988-9.
- Riley, Charles A. (2001). Aristocracy and the Modern Imagination. UPNE. ISBN 978-1-58465-151-2.
- Rubin, James H. (2014). "Eugène Delacroix's Portrait of Charles de Verninac, 1825-26". Nineteenth-Century Art Worldwide.
- Société héraldique et généalogique de France (1886). Bulletin.
- Sjöberg, Yves (1963). Pour comprendre Delacroix. Editions Beauchesne. GGKEY:021FPT3P5E8.
