= Villefranche-du-Queyran =

- Commune
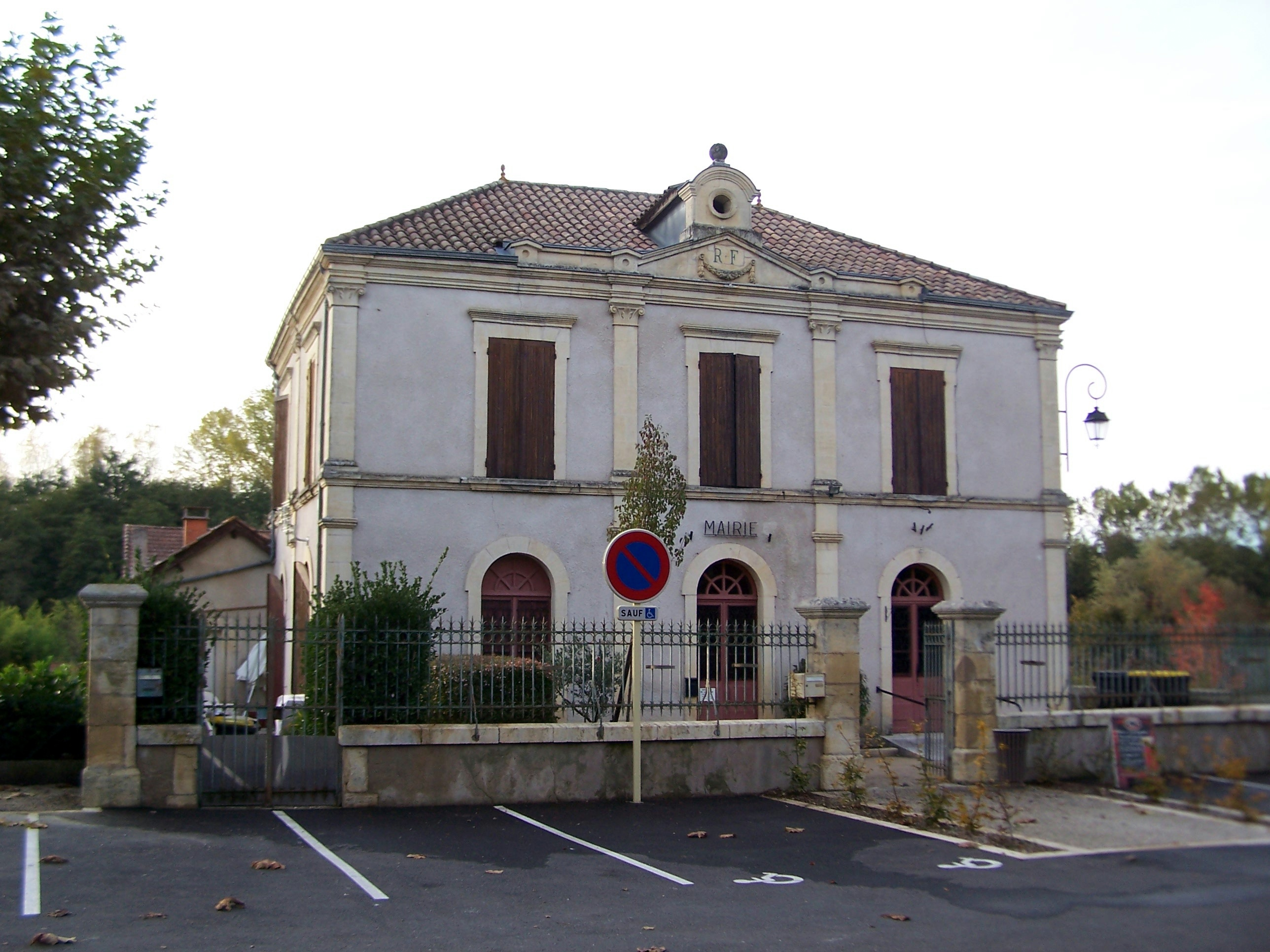
- Villefranche-du-Queyran Town hall

- Coat of arms
- Location of Villefranche-du-Queyran
- Location within France Location within Nouvelle-Aquitaine
- Coordinates: 44°18′32″N 0°11′52″E
- Country: France
- Region: Nouvelle-Aquitaine
- Department: Lot-et-Garonne
- Arrondissement: Nérac
- Canton: Les Forêts de Gascogne
- Intercommunality: Coteaux et Landes de Gascogne

Government
  - Mayor (2020–2026): Jean-Marie Gouyou
- Area^{1}: 16.55 km^{2} (6.39 sq mi)
- Elevation: 54 m (177 ft)
- Highest elevation: 182 m (597 ft)
- Lowest elevation: 45 m (148 ft)
- Population (2023): 415
  - Density: 25.1/km^{2} (64.9/sq mi)
- Time zone: UTC+01:00 (CET)
  - Summer (DST): UTC+02:00 (CEST)
- INSEE/Postal code: 47320 /47160
- ^{1} French Land Register data, which excludes lakes, ponds, glaciers > 1 km^{2} (0.386 sq mi or 247 acres) and river estuaries.

Villefranche-du-Queyran (French pronunciation: [vilfʁɑ̃ʃ dy kɛʁɑ̃]; Gascon: Vilafranca deu Cairan) is a commune in the Lot-et-Garonne department in south-western France.

== See also ==
- Communes of the Lot-et-Garonne department
