= Philippe Buchez =

French historian, sociologist, and politician (1796–1865)

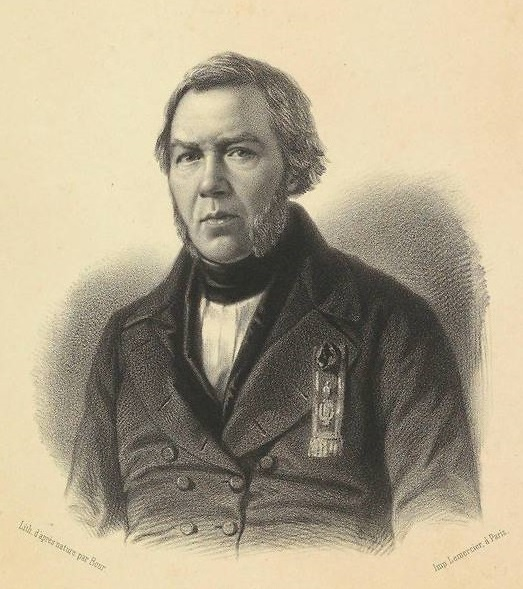
Philippe Buchez by Charles Bour

Philippe-Joseph-Benjamin Buchez (March 31, 1796–August 11, 1865), more commonly called Philippe Buchez, was a French historian, sociologist, and politician. He was the founder of the newspaper L'Atelier, and he served briefly, in 1848, as the president of the Constituent National Assembly, which was then meeting at the Palais Bourbon in Paris.

Buchez was born at Matagne-la-Petite, which is part of the town of Doische in the province of Namur, in Belgium. At the time of his birth (31 March 1796), however, the village was part of the French département of the Ardennes. He died on 11 August 1865 in the south of France, at Rodez, in the department of Aveyron.

== La Charbonnerie ==
He finished his general education in Paris, and then applied himself to the study of natural science and medicine. In 1821, he co-operated with Amand Bazard, Jacques-Thomas Flotard, and others to found a secret association, La Charbonnerie, modeled on the Italian Carbonari, with the object of launching an armed insurrection against the French government. The organization spread rapidly and widely, and made several abortive attempts to foment revolution. In one of these attempts, the affair at Belfort, Buchez was gravely compromised. However, the jury that heard his case did not find sufficient evidence to warrant condemnation. Failed insurrectionary attempts of Charbonnerie in Belfort (January and July), Thouars and Saumur (February), culminated in the September execution in Paris of the Four Sergeants of La Rochelle affair (Quatre Sergents de La Rochelle).

In 1825, he graduated in medicine, and soon published Études de théologie, de philosophie et d'histoire ("Studies in Theology, Philosophy, and History"). About the same time, he became a member of the Saint-Simonian Society, presided over by Bazard, Barthélemy Prosper Enfantin, and Olinde Rodrigues. (The society was based on the ideas of Saint-Simon, an early socialist theoretician.) Buchez also contributed to its organ, the Producteur, but he left this group because of the strange religious ideas of its "Supreme Father," Enfantin. Buchez began to elaborate on his own original ideas, which he characterized as Christian socialism. For the exposition and advocacy of his principles he founded a periodical called L'Européen.

In 1833, he published an Introduction à la science de l'histoire ou science du développement de l'humanité, which was received with considerable favor (2nd ed., improved and enlarged, 2 vols., 1842). Notwithstanding its prolixity, this is an interesting work. The part that describes the aim, foundation, and methods of the science of history is valuable; but what is most distinctive in Buchez's theory is the division of historical development into four great epochs originated by four universal revelations, of each epoch into three periods corresponding to desire, reasoning, and performance — and of each of these periods into a theoretical and practical age — is merely ingenious (see Flint's Philosophy of History in Europe, i. 242–252).

== A parliamentary history of the French revolution ==
Buchez next edited, along with M. Roux-Lavergne (1802–1874), the Histoire parlementaire de la Révolution française (1833–1838; 40 vols.). This vast and conscientious publication is a valuable store of material for the early periods of the first French Revolution. There is a review of it by Thomas Carlyle (Miscellanies), the first two parts of whose own history of the French Revolution are mainly drawn from it.

The editors strongly admired the principles of Robespierre and the Jacobins. They also espoused the belief that the French Revolution was an attempt to fulfill Christianity's promise. In the Essai d’un Traité Complet de Philosophie au point de vue du Catholicisme et du Progrès (1839–1840), Buchez endeavored to co-ordinate, in a single system, the political, moral, religious, and natural phenomena of existence. Denying the possibility of innate ideas, he asserted that morality comes by revelation. Therefore, it is not only certain, but the only real certainty possible.

== Revue Nationale and L'Atelier ==
At the outset of the revolution of 1848, Buchez established the Revue Nationale to reach out to workers and all the democratic convictions. In the same fashion, Buchez had assisted, in September 1840, in the appropriation of the worker-owned and worker-operated newspaper, L'Atelier ("The Workshop"), a publication that was, at once, utopian, socialist, and Christian.

== Political apex ==
Partly owing to the reputation he acquired by these publications but more to his connection with the National newspaper and secret societies hostile to the government of Louis-Philippe, the French Revolution of 1848 raised him to the presidency of the Constituent Assembly. When the revolution of 1848 began on 24 February, Buchez, as a captain in the National Guard, took his unit to the Tuileries, where they witnessed the flight of Louis-Philippe. In the days that followed, Buchez became maire-adjoint (assistant mayor) of Paris, and was elected to the national constituent assembly of 1848.

== The demonstration of 15 May 1848 ==
On 15 May 1848, a popular nonviolent invasion of the assembly took place. This invasion was an attempt to express the essential needs of the working population of Paris and of the nation. Buchez was, at that time, president of the assembly. Faithful to his convictions and trust in the people, he did not call for the use of force to clear the chamber. This calm response earned Buchez scorn and loud criticism from prominent assembly members.

Tocqueville in his Recollections described this day, disdainfully recalling Buchez's conduct: "Buchez" he wrote, "the president, whom some would make out to be a rascal and others a saint, but who, on that day, was a great blockhead, rang his bell with all his might to obtain silence, as though the silence of that multitude was not, under the circumstances, more to be dreaded than its cries." He speedily showed he did not possess the qualities needed in such a situation. He retained the position only for a short time. After the dissolution of the assembly he was not re-elected.

== Retirement ==
Thrown back into private life, he resumed his studies, and added several works to those already mentioned. A Traité de politique (published 1866), which may be considered as the completion of his Traité de philosophie, was the most important of the productions of the last period of his life. His brochures are very numerous and on a great variety of subjects, medical, historical, political, philosophical, etc. He died on 12 August 1865. He found a disciple of considerable ability in A. Ott, who advocated and applied his principles in various writings.

== Sources ==
- Armand Cuvillier, Un journal d'ouvriers : "L'atelier" (1840–1850), Éditions Ouvrières, Paris, 1954.
- Notice de l'Université de l'Ohio sur "L'Atelier"
