= Charles Étienne Raymond Victor de Verninac =

French diplomat (1803–1834)

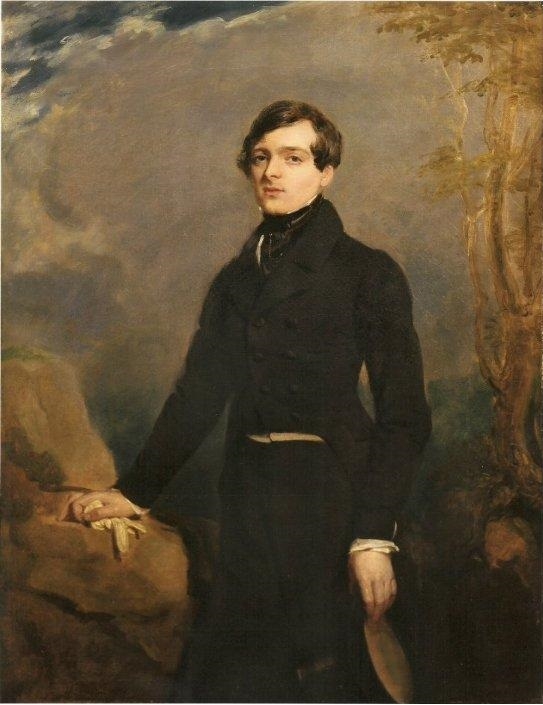
- Portrait of Charles de Verninac (c. 1825-26) by Eugène Delacroix
- Born: 19 November 1803; Paris, France
- Died: 22 May 1834 (aged 30); New York, United States
- Occupation: Diplomat

Charles Étienne Raymond Victor de Verninac (19 November 1803 – 22 May 1834) was a minor French diplomat, nephew of the painter Eugène Delacroix (1798–1863). He is known for a portrait that Delacroix painted of him as a young man. After serving as a vice-consul in Chile he died of yellow fever at the age of thirty.

== Early years ==
Charles Étienne Raymond Victor de Verninac was born in Paris, France, on 19 November 1803, the only child of the diplomat Raymond de Verninac Saint-Maur and Henriette de Verninac, sister of Eugène Delacroix. The couple took care of Delacroix in 1814 after the death of his mother. He became attached to his nephew, Charles, who was just five years younger than him. When Charles came to Paris to attend the Lycée Louis-le-Grand, Delacroix acted as his informal guardian.

== Career ==
In 1821 Charles de Verninac graduated and returned to live with his parents in the country. After his father died in 1822 he returned to Paris and began to study law. He graduated in 1824 and worked in Paris until 1829. Around 1826 Delacroix painted his portrait in a work that is both sensitive and sentimental. In 1829 he entered the diplomatic corps.

Charles de Verninac was posted to Malta in 1829 as a trainee Vice-Consul. In 1831 he was appointed to Chile as a Vice-Consul. He sailed from Toulon and reached Valparaíso five months later on 11 May 1832 after a rough passage around Cape Horn. He was placed in charge of consular affairs there. He left Valparaiso in January 1834 on a return journey to France by way of the Isthmus of Panama. He caught yellow fever in Vera Cruz. He died of this disease on 22 May 1834 in New York Harbor. He was aged 30.
