= Mademoiselle Rose =

Painting by Eugène Delacroix

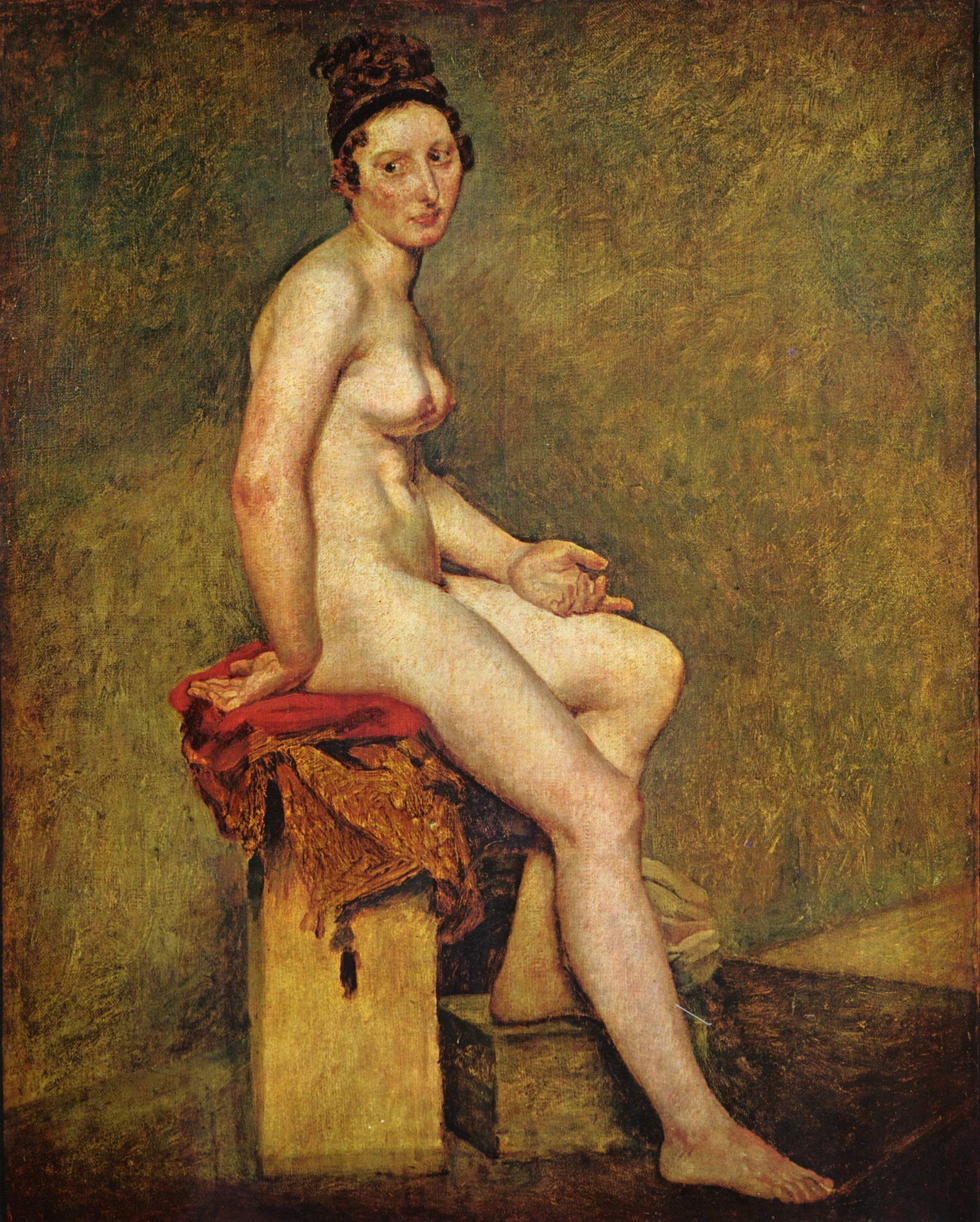
- Artist: Eugène Delacroix
- Year: 1817–1824
- Medium: Oil on canvas
- Dimensions: 81 cm × 66 cm (32 in × 26 in)
- Location: Louvre; Paris

Mademoiselle Rose (also Seated Nude) is a painting by French Romantic artist Eugène Delacroix, regarded as the leader of the French Romantic school. This nude was painted before 1824, and is currently held and exhibited at the Louvre in Paris. Another is at the Alte Nationalgalerie in Berlin.

== History ==
The model is seen from the side, seated on a kind of wooden pedestal half covered with a piece of red material. Her left foot rests on a wooden block; her head is turned towards the artist and is therefore seen full face.

This nude is painted in a somewhat awkward studio pose. The sitter has been identified (but without certainty) as Mademoiselle Rose, an artists' model who according to Alfred Robaut, Delacroix's biographer, posed several times for him and for Richard Parkes Bonington, and who perhaps distributed her favours impartially between the two artists. In a letter to his friend Pierret, usually dated 1820, Delacroix wrote:

I had tried to persuade Felix (Guillemardet) to come and join us tomorrow, but he said that the shortage of money had got the better of Mademoiselle Rose's bottom on this occasion.

This particular nude is represented with an almost naturalistic sincerity, without any decorative arrangement. Although it already displays the variations of light on flesh which interested the artist so deeply, the pigment, applied in masterly touches in a granular impasto, has not yet acquired the fluidity which was to owe to the influence of English painting. This first made itself felt at the Salon of 1824, where Delacroix saw works by John Constable, and increased in 1825, the date of his visit to London.

The upward trend of his work, clearly seen in this painting, brings its date to the period 1820–1822, but cannot be fixed precisely. However, the nude has not only a pictorial interest: Delacroix brings to the painting an emotion which is firmly rooted in Romanticism. Moreover, the slight timidity of the attitude, the somewhat anxious expression of the face, give to this life-class painting a quality of humanity that is purely French Romantic.

== See also ==
- Eugène Delacroix
- Musée national Eugène Delacroix
- Romanticism
