= Léon Riesener =

French painter (1808–1878)

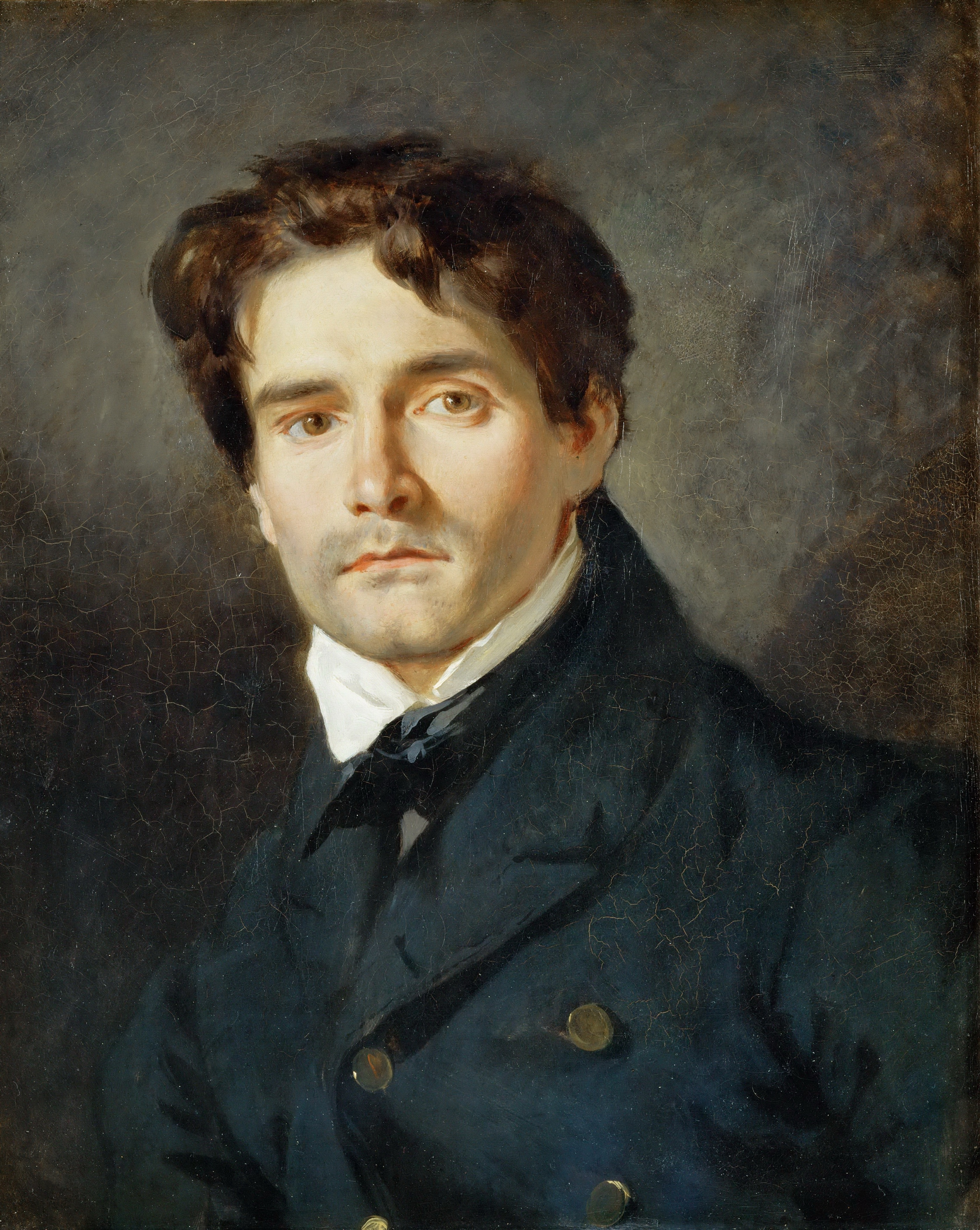
- Portrait of Léon Riesener by his cousin Eugène Delacroix (1835)
- Born: Louis Antoine Léon Riesener; 21 January 1808; Paris, France
- Died: 25 May 1878 (aged 70); Paris, France
- Education: Studios of Henri-François Riesener and Antoine-Jean Gros
- Known for: Painting
- Movement: Romanticism
- Awards: Légion d'honneur

Louis Antoine Léon Riesener (21 January 1808 – 25 May 1878) was a French Romantic painter.

Enchanted by the play of light and reflections which transformed the appearance of matter, Riesener began a new aesthetic that made him one of the precursors of impressionism. He was a passionate colourist and researched all the nuances of colour. He studied techniques from ancient Greece and the Renaissance, including Titian, Veronese and Correggio. Impressed by Rubens' research into colour, he considered him the Shakespeare of painting and was greatly inspired by him. Very early in his career Riesener studied tonal divisions, well before the physician Chevreul discovered their scientific basis. His tactile taste led him to look for the most perfect expression of matter and particularly of skin. He put poetry into his painting by the play of shadow and he passionately admired nature, life and all the beauties they produced.

He researched the subject of life in the countryside and, liking to paint reality, said he wanted to express "the heat of the day, the melancholy of the evening, meadows, flowers as they are in nature". His study of the elements caused him to paint a series of skies which varied according to the light and time of day – the subjects were ahead of their time and Riesener had to fight hard against the Salon juries and the Institut. Using pure colours, he excluded the blacks and whites which had been used for shadows and light before him. His material science of colour was the opposition which gave birth to contrasts from juxtaposed pigments. He did not portray faces by contours, but by shadows and modelling.

== Life ==
=== Early career ===
Riesener was born in Paris. He came from an artistic family – his father Henri-François Riesener was also a painter, whilst his paternal grandfather Jean Henri Riesener was a noted German-born cabinet-maker. Léon had his first artistic training from his father while still a child and, on leaving collège, his father gained him a position in Antoine-Jean Gros's studio. Passionate about beauty and researching new techniques in colour, Riesener struggled against the prevailing taste of his time from his youth onwards.

=== Relations with Delacroix ===
After his father's return from Russia in 1823 Léon got to know Eugène Delacroix better. Ten years older than Riesener, Delacroix was his first-cousin – they shared a grandmother, Marguerite-Françoise Vandercruse, whose daughter by her first marriage was Delacroix's mother and whose second husband Jean-Henri Riesener was Riesener's grandfather. Delacroix quickly recognised Riesener's talent and originality and he supported his early career by recommending him to civil servants he knew. On trips to the countryside they met at Valmont, near Fécamp, the home of their cousin Bataille, owner of the abbaye from 1822 onwards. Riesener devotedly attended Pierret's salon (Pierret was a school friend of Delacroix), where he met Mérimée, Viel-Castel, Sauvageot, Feuillet de Conches, Viollet-le-Duc, Lasus and Guillemardet. Later, Riesener became friends with Fantin-Latour, Ernest Chausson and the Morisots (the Morisot family was very friendly with the Riesener family, with Rosalie Riesener's friend Berthe Morisot researching Léon's opinions, listening to his advice and copying out about 135 pages of his writings). His friends were artists and he preferred a quiet life rather than the high life favoured by Delacroix.

From childhood, Riesener and Delacroix were friends and confidants. So different in life and character and so independent, they were preoccupied by the same artistic problems and enjoyed exchanging ideas, both having been formed by the 18th century and its neo-classical culture. They discussed their study of the classical world and they were both colourist painters searching for new techniques in tonal division. The difference in their temperaments expressed itself in their ways of looking at nature – Delacroix thought of drama, Riesener thought of sensuality. Delacroix bought Riesener's painting Angélique as an exemplar for all painters and put it in his studio. On his death in 1863, Delacroix left Riesener his country house at Champrosay.

=== Later career ===
From 1830 to 1839 Riesener began exhibiting important works, such as The Education of the Virgin. He painted religious subjects and portraits – he was attracted by naturalist subjects, such as a child-shepherd, a child orphan, a peasant returning from Mass, a bohemian, a still life and nudes such as Venus, Flora and Erigone. In 1839 he received his first state commission, from France's Ministry of the Interior, a copy of The Scourging of Christ by Titian. On 8 October 1839 he married the young middle-class Laure Peytouraud and they had three children: Thérèse (1840–1932), Rosalie (1843–1913) and Louise (1860–1944). His absorption in his family and his art allowed him to live outside of political events.

Riesener's output was highly diverse in subject matter, while his favourite media were oils and pastels. From 1839 to 1848 he received important mural commissions – the five ceilings of the library of the Chambre des Pairs (1840–1843) and the decoration of the chapel of the hospital at Charenton (1843–1849). During the same period he received further commissions from the Ministry of the Interior – Jesus amongst the Doctors and various versions of The Birth of the Virgin and Niobe. He continued to exhibit at the Paris Salon, with Leda (1841) and The Magdalene (1849). He painted a series of portraits, several of which featured in the Salon of 1850, including those of Pierret and Théophile Gautier.

=== In Normandy ===
Léon Riesener had first travelled to Normandy as a child. Later he also painted at the château de Valmont and on the Côte d'Albâtre beside Delacroix. Riesener's main Normandy period came in 1857, however, that year, feeling a need for solitude and new impressions, he bought a mill at Beuzeval, a town later re-attached to Houlgate. There the spectacle of nature, which had always enchanted him, allowed him to forget the hubbub of Paris and the injustices of the Salon juries. Riesener was deeply involved in research into colour, which was for him "the expression of visible things by the poetic effect that light imposes on them". His stays at Beuzeval produced a series of works on solar effects, seascapes, sunken lanes and open-air landscapes. Several artists came to the mill, forming a circle around Riesener. He explored the rocky coast nearby with his friends Constant Troyon and Huet and talked about art and literature with Jouvet, Delisle and Jules Paton. After two consecutive summers, he left the mill to the Morisot family.

=== Final years ===
From 1860 he exhibited A Bather, The Muses and Jupiter and Juno at the Salon. In 1871 he received a state commission in Antwerp and left for there. He also travelled around the Netherlands from Antwerp, admiring the works of Rubens and Rembrandt. He returned to Paris on 1 July 1872 and – fired up by his trip – decided to realise one of his dearest desires, a trip to Italy. He left on 12 May 1875, aged 68, and visited Geneva, Milan, Como, Parma, Rome, Turin and Naples. However, after climbing mount Vesuvius during a storm, he fell ill and had to cut his journey short. He returned to Paris and died there two years later. He is buried in the cimetière du Père-Lachaise.

On his death, the Impressionists paid tribute to him as the forerunner of their movement – Auguste Renoir drew a portrait of him "carried off in a whirlwind of nude bacchantes and flowers" (evoking one of the features of Riesener's art) for the frontispiece of la Vie moderne (17 April 1879). Fantin-Latour surveyed Riesener's paintings and drawings and organised two exhibitions of them, one of which was at the galerie Georges-Petit. At the sale of Riesener's studio, Degas bought 75 drawings. As for Duranty, after evoking "this ardent companion of all seekers and of all innovators" and "the precursor of the family that came later", he stated his conviction that "in the history of painting of this era, his name remains inscribed with the beautiful, delicate and strong colours of his palette".

== Extracts from Léon Riesener's writings ==
- "What is beautiful is what is allowed – our senses know their laws without them needing to be explained to them. In this regard, they never trick themselves – they perfectly know beauty, and when we are led into the currents of artificial seductions, by fashion and the appetite for their novelties : it is our mind alone which does battle..."
- "Studying drawing fixes the way of truth in the mind, in despite the diversions which throw the prejudices of a jaded and distorted civilisation against it. Studying drawing and the physical laws is the only thing in our time which gives us consistency of ideas, which without this support remain in a cloudy state or seem like soap bubbles."
- "The artist and the poet are not always right. They are always above or below it, even. People who see things as they are maybe superior, but they are not artists."
- "The beautiful is not synonymous with beauty – the antique, always beautiful, is often without beauty. Art must always remain young, even savage. Science, civilisation, law kill it."
- "Beauty, graces, all perfections are placed in nature in such a simple and usual way that most men would not be sensible of them if the artist's imagination did not awaken them to them. The artist tracking these beauties admires them with passion – this passion translates itself into his works - by a poetic exaggeration which is more understandable than nature herself."

== Main works ==
Some works he produced as a young man have disappeared. The most important public collection of his works is that at the château de Saint-Germain-de-Livet, owned by the commune of Lisieux after being left to it by his grandson Julien Pillaut. The musée du Louvre and musée national Eugène-Delacroix also own a large number of his drawings and pastels.

=== Works in public collections ===
- Romantic young woman in a garden (1830), pastel, Musée d'art et d'histoire de Lisieux
- Portrait of His de Butunval, (1834), 57×68 cm, Musée des Beaux-Arts de Rouen
- The Little Shepherd (1838), Musée d'art et d'histoire de Lisieux
- Liliums on the forest floor (1838), Musée d'art et d'histoire de Lisieux
- The toilet of Venus (1838), Musée des Beaux-Arts de Lyon
- Leda, (1840), 110×154 cm, Musée des Beaux-Arts de Rouen
- Angélique (1842), Musée du Louvre
- Portrait of Rosalie, the artist's daughter (1848), Musée d'art et d'histoire de Lisieux
- Portrait of Madame Léon Riesener (1849), pastel, Musée national Eugène-Delacroix
- Portrait of Madame Louis-Auguste Bornot, with her son Camille (1850), Musée Eugène-Delacroix
- Portrait of Théophile Gautier (1850), pastel, Maison de Balzac, 45×38 cm
- Portrait of a child with a round head (c. 1850), Musée d'art et d'histoire de Lisieux
- The Death of Niobe's Children, (1855), 310×350 cm, Musée d'Auxerre
- Bacchante (1855), 108×134 cm, Musée du Louvre
- Portrait, presumed to be of the duchess of Albe (c. 1858), Musée d'art et d'histoire de Lisieux
- Portrait of Mademoiselle Ehrler (1861), Musée du Petit Palais
- Cows in the undergrowth (1863), Musée d'art et d'histoire de Lisieux
- Portrait of a young woman (1877), Musée d'art et d'histoire de Lisieux

=== Decorative paintings ===
- Philosophy - Poetry - Gospel - Law - History (1848–49), library of the Chambre des Paires, Palais du Luxembourg
- The Presentation in the Temple - The Rest on the Flight into Egypt - The Road to Calvary - The Crucifixion (1854–57), Église Saint-Eustache, Paris (Chapelle de la Compassion).
- The Virgin enthroned with the Christ Child on her knees, chapel of the hôpital Esquirol, Charenton
