= French Empire mantel clock =

Decorated Napoleonic Empire shelf clock

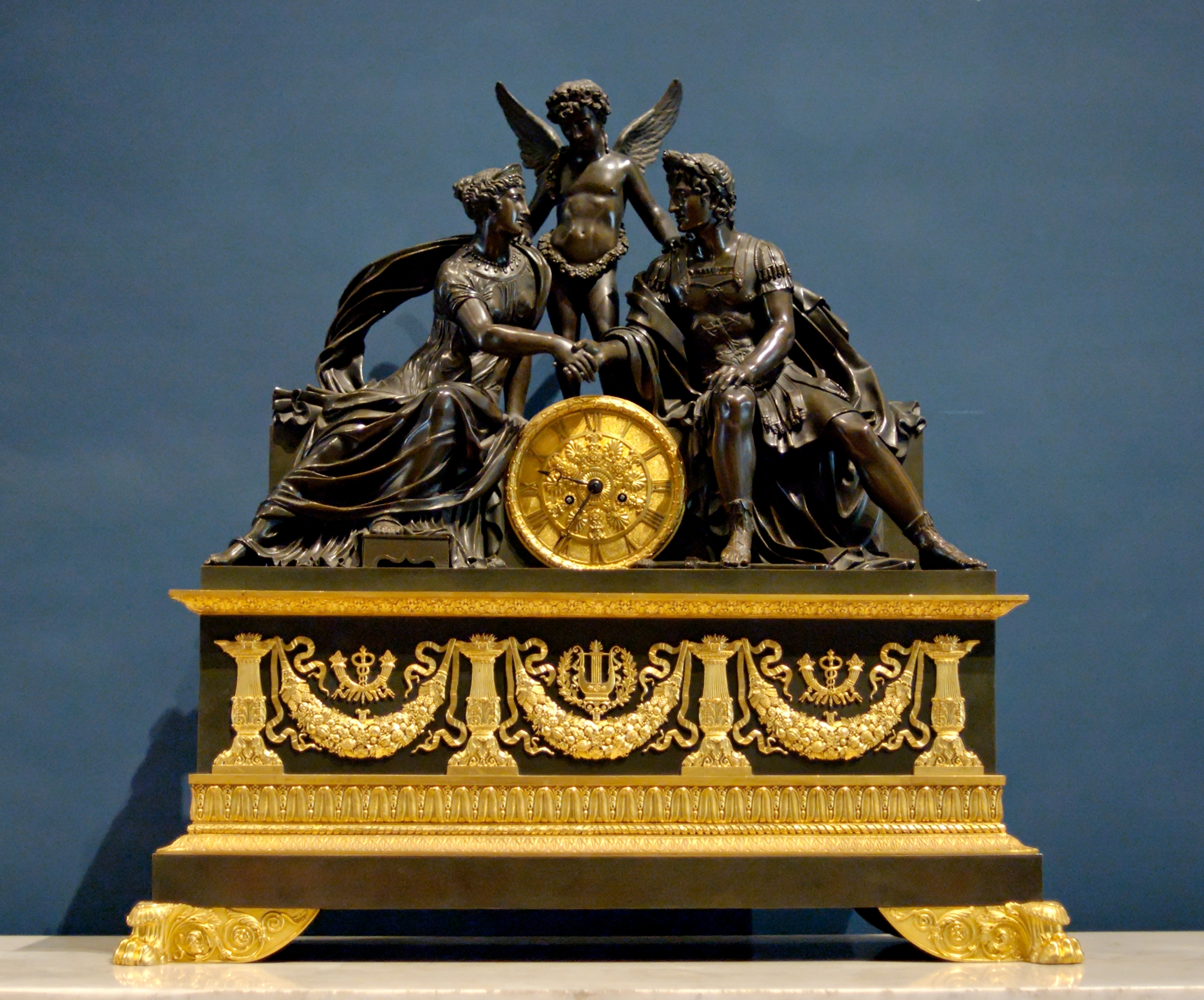
Patinated and ormolu bronze piece representing Mars and Venus, an allegory of the wedding of Napoleon I and Archduchess Marie Louise of Austria. By the famous bronzier Pierre-Philippe Thomire, c. 1810.

A French Empire-style mantel clock is a type of elaborately decorated mantel clock that was made in France during the Napoleonic Empire (1804–1814/15). Timekeepers manufacturing during the Bourbon Restoration (1814/1815–1830) are also included within this art movement as they share similar subjects, decorative elements, shapes, and style.

== Precedents ==
By the end of the 18th century, from the mid-1770s on, French clockmakers contributed to a new art movement: Neoclassicism. This style in architecture, painting, sculpture, and the decorative arts, that had come into its own during the last years of Louis XV's life, chiefly as a reaction to the excesses of the Rococo movement but also partly through the popularity of the excavations at ancient Herculaneum and Pompeii, in Italy.

Clocks of this style did without the profuse ornamentation and elaborate designs of the preceding Rococo style so typical of the Louis XV reign.

The timekeepers manufacturing during the Louis XVI and the French First Republic historical periods incorporated this new artistic language with classical designs, allegories, and motifs. In the case of the Louis XVI pieces, stone (usually white marble, alabaster or biscuit) was combined with gilded and/or patinated bronze, although certain cases were completely cast in bronze. Some models were architectural (i.e., with no figures) while others displayed classical-style figurines.

During the 1790s, the production of gilded-bronze increased considerably as working conditions improved. The freedom of trade initiated by the French Revolution allowed many casters to develop large factories. Prior to this time, during the ancien régime, they were limited to small workshops and were strictly limited to casting bronze. The new factory environment allowed them the opportunity to execute all stages of bronze work including drawing, casting, gilding, assembly, and trade of art objects. Artisans still benefited from pre-Revolution training and worked according to the standards of a luxury art from the ancien régime, but they had better means of production and organization.

== Characteristics ==
=== Materials and techniques ===
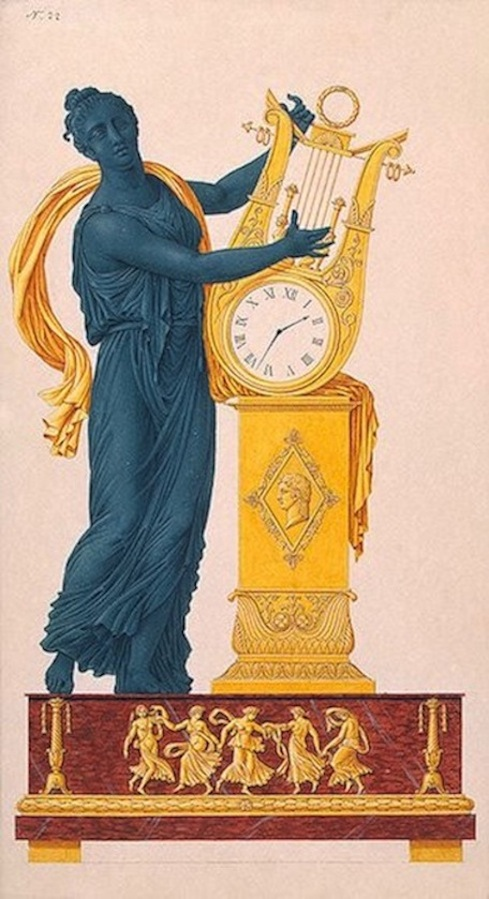
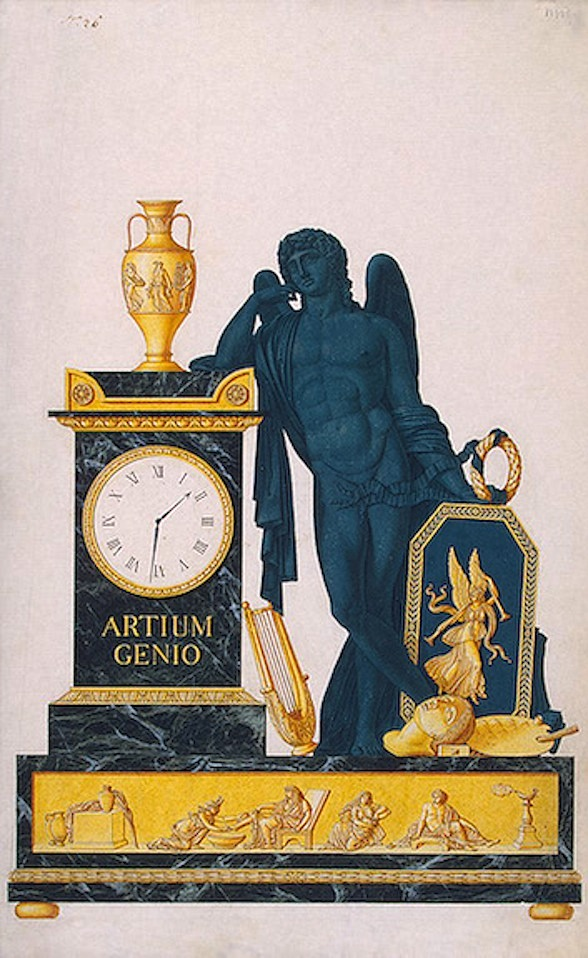
Two sketches representing; an allegory of "Music" on the left and the "Genius of Arts" on the right.

The use of gilt-bronze to make luxury goods could be argued to have reached its peak at the beginning of the 19th century in France. This medium was not new, as it had enjoyed international reputation in Europe since the reign of Louis XIV that continued during the entire ancien régime. One reason for this success is the technical qualities inherent in bronze. Cheaper than gold and silver, it is a common material that is easy to mold and gild. For this reason, it became the favorite material for clock cases, candelabra and furniture ornaments. Thanks to the skill of remarkable bronze casters and chasers these objects were not merely timekeepers, but became objets d'art.

This golden age ended in the late 1820s, when the generation of craftsmen and laborers died out, cheaper metals started to be increasingly used (e.g. brass) and bronze casting entered into a higher mechanization, sacrificing craftsmanship to increase productivity, and to reduce costs and manufacturing time.

Bronze was the main material used in Empire style timepieces and both the patina and ormolu techniques were extensively used for ornamentation during this period. The fine modeling, gilt and patina finishes used in these series-produced pendulum clocks are considered matchless. Most clock cases were totally cast in bronze and others combined with a stone base made of marble, alabaster or porphyry. Wood (mahogany or fruit wood) and carved crystal (the latter used during the Restoration) were also employed, although less frequently.

During this period there were between 40 and 60 workshops with founders, gilders, silversmiths, and chasers in Paris. The founders usually made a wax model from a draft and from this wax model a negative plaster cast was made, which could be reproduced more often. Then using this plaster cast a mould was made, in which the bronze was cast. By combining figures and mountings several versions of one design were produced.

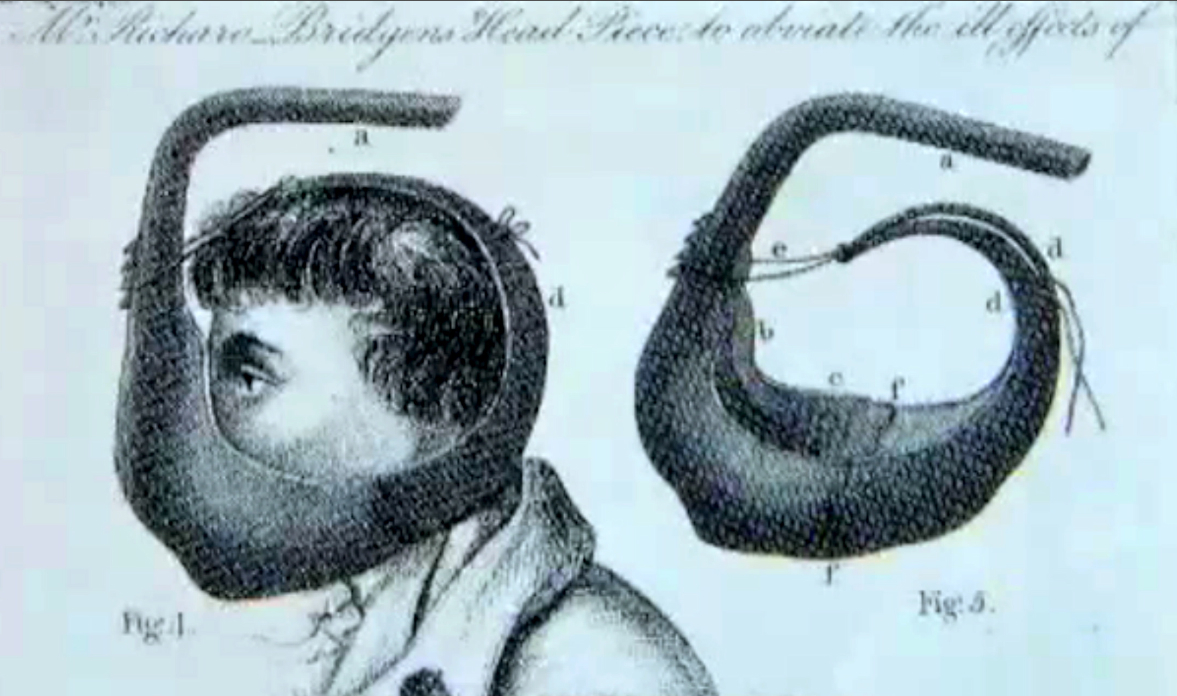
A sort of mask used to protect the gilder from the poisonous mercury fumes.

Due to exposure to harmful mercury fumes during the "dorure au mercure" (fire-gilding) process, most gilders did not survive beyond 40 years of age as a consequence of mercury poisoning. Even in those days, they took all kinds of precautions against mercury poisoning. These measures included chewing bread, or placing a piece of leather with an embedded silver coin over the tongue (the silver coin would change color when exposed to mercury). There was also a kind of mask devised to inhale the air from behind the head. None of these measures were sufficient counter-measures against mercury poisoning.

Consequently the use of mercury was outlawed by French legislation after around 1830, although its use continued commonly until circa 1900 and it even was still in use in a very few workshops around 1960. To replace ormolu, other gilding techniques (like electroplating from the mid-19th century on) were utilized instead.

Regarding the mechanism, towards the end of the 18th century, round clock movements became a reliable mass-produced product. Known as "Pendule de Paris" (Paris, or French, clock movements), they were an 8-day movement with anchor escapement, silk thread suspended pendulum with a count wheel striking on a bell every hour and half-hour. By the 1840s the simple and very effective silk suspension was being replaced by various adjustable spring suspension systems.

It is necessary to emphasize that unlike the clocks built in the 18th century, where the majority of them were signed, the authorship in many of the Empire ones remains anonymous, making it difficult to attribute one particular work to a certain bronze sculptor. To this must be added that it was a common practice among bronziers selling pieces to each other and even to copy or readapt others' designs. When signed, they usually bear the name on the dial and could be the bronzier's name as well as the retailer's name or the movement maker.

A small clock, usually covered by a glass bell, could cost 150 francs and 7.000 francs for the biggest works intended to decorate the halls of palaces and big houses. The total price comprised the work of the different people involved in its manufacturing process:

- About 10% for the model design.
- Casting, 20%.
- Chiseling, 30%.
- Gilding, 30%.
- The movement only represented between 5 and 10%.

This meant that about 90% of the production costs were the sculpture and the case making.

=== Style and design ===
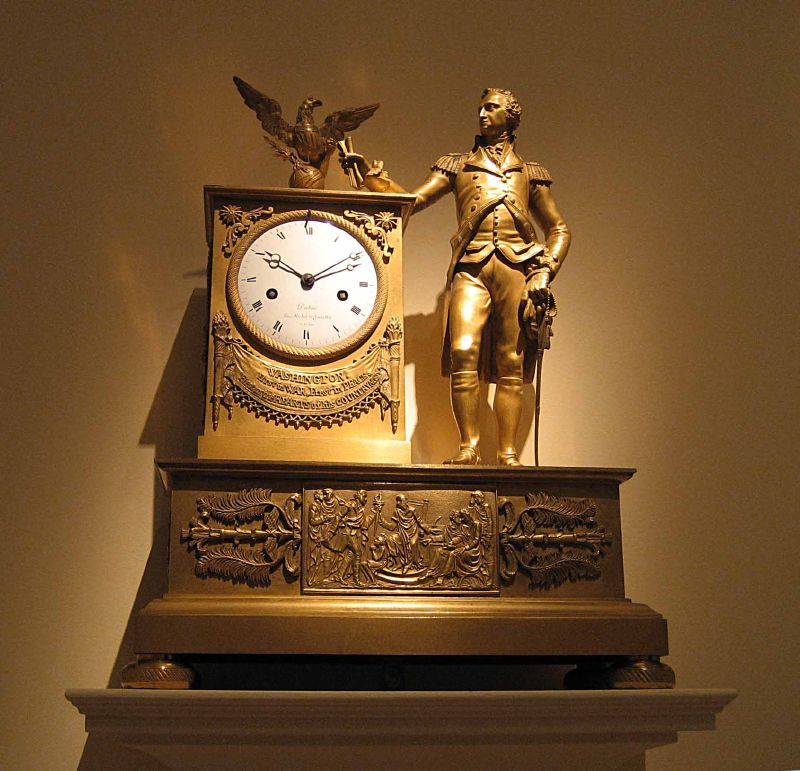
C. 1810–1815 piece presenting George Washington in full military dress. Metropolitan Museum of Art.

The clocks were manufactured following the style then in vogue, the Empire style, a phase within the Neoclassical scope, based on the classical antiquity art; both the ancient Greece and specially the Roman Empire.

Although there were a great diversity of case shapes, the most common and popular ones were the clocks with a rectangular or oblong base sustained by four (or more) legs of different forms and patterns. The pedestal front was normally decorated with either garlands, acanthus tendrils, acroterions, laurel wreaths, scrolls, flowers and other classical decorative motifs, or depicting finely chased mythological and allegoric scenes in relief as a frieze of a Greek-Roman temple. On top of the base (in the center or to one side) sat the plinth that accommodated the clock dial, however in other models it was also placed in cart wheels, rocks, shields, globes, tree trunks, etc.

These timekeepers were embellished with fine bronze figures of art, sciences, and high ideals allegories, gods, goddesses, muses, cupids, classical literary heroes and other allegorical or mythological compositions. Sometimes historical personages such as Alexander the Great, Julius Caesar, George Washington, Napoleon Bonaparte, philosophers and classical authors, were the main theme as well. Hence they are also known as figural or sculptural clocks (rather than architectural).

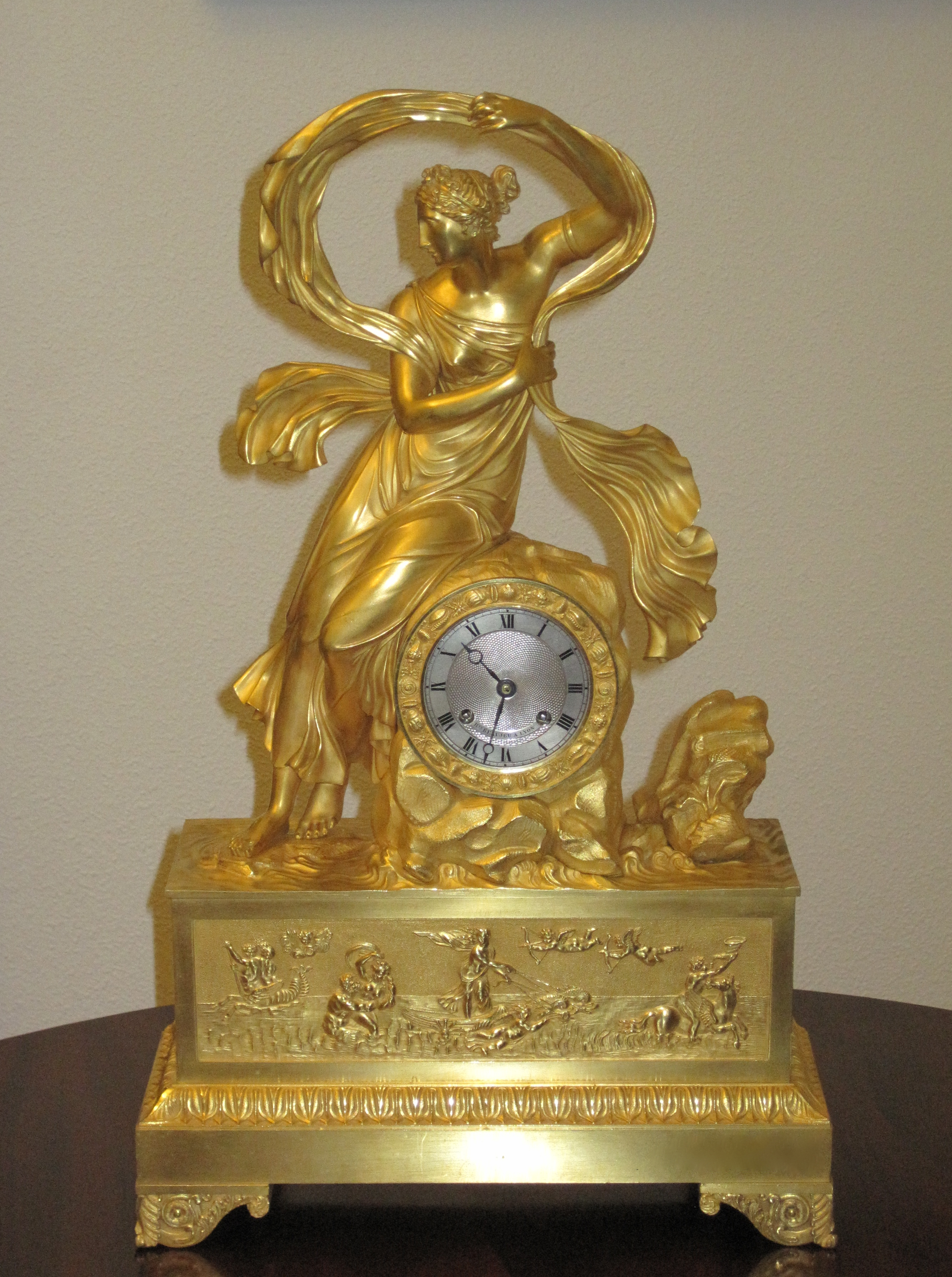
An 1822 clock depicting the nereid Galatea, Catherine Palace. The respective allegoric composition in relief of the frieze, represents the "Triumph of Galatea", based on the homonymous fresco by Rafael Sanzio.

Likewise, another of the sculptor's source of inspiration for the composition of a certain design were both classical sculptures and celebrated paintings. Examples of the first one include the Sleeping Ariadne and Psyche Revived by Cupid's Kiss by Antonio Canova or Psyche crowning Amor after a model by Claude Michallon. In painting can be quoted the Oath of the Horatii by Jacques-Louis David, Héro et Léandre by Pierre-Claude-François Delorme, etc.

The classical gods served as models and symbols for the era. For instance, the chariot clocks or "pendules au char" were an exceptional category within the Empire clocks. Apollo, Diana and Cupid depicted as triumphant chariot drivers, were the most popular gods used. It was habitual during the Napoleonic times and particularly under the "Directoire" and "Consulat" regimes that clocks glorify the conduct of warfare.

More domestic and romantic subjects, like the "temple of love", gained popularity after the downfall of the Napoleon's Empire. During the Restoration (1815–1830) the representation of warfare scenes was not as common as in the early Empire.

Finally, under the reign of Charles X (1824–1830), the case designs started gradually to develop away from a proportionate and strict classicism towards a baroque style which announced the eclecticism and historicisms in forms, so typical, on the other side, of the rest of the 19th century. That's why during the second half of that century and early 20th, among all of the different revival styles of mantel clocks available; Rococo, Louis XVI, etc., timepieces in the Empire style were made as well, normally they were replicas or adaptations based on preexisting models.

Empire clocks in general and the largest and most notable examples in particular from the top bronziers, such as Pierre-Philippe Thomire, Claude Galle, André-Antoine Ravrio, Louis-Stanislas Lenoir-Ravrio, etc., are considered more than just clocks. They are works of art as well, sculptural études, where the balance in composition and the study of objects, animals and the human bodies forms and expressions are carefully and meticulously reflected in the bronze figures, achieving a high degree of realism, perfectionism and delicacy.

These timepieces were devised to decorate the console tables or mantelpieces of a given hall or room in palaces, European and American mansions, houses, offices, etc. Today many of them are part of royal collections and can be seen in palaces, official residences, embassies, ministries, museums all over the world, etc.

Even nowadays a few companies replicate this style, proving that the attention to detail, exquisite taste, superb workmanship, elegance and refinement achieved by the different artists and craftsmen involved in its manufacturing, are everlasting and timeless alike.

== Bronziers ==
List of the most renowned bronziers active during the Napoleonic and/or the Restoration periods, in alphabetical order:

- André-Antoine Ravrio (1759–1814).
- Claude Galle (1759–1815).
- Claude-François Rabiat (1756–1815).
- Denière et Matelin. Named for Jean-François Denière (1774–1866) and François Thomas Matelin (1759–1815).
- Etienne Blavet (1751–1827).
- François-Aimé Damerat (active between 1781–1819).
- François-Louis Savart.
- François Rémond (or Raimond) (1745/47–1812).
- Gérard-Jean Galle (1788–1846). The eldest son of Claude Galle.
- Jean-André Reiche (1752–1817).
- Jean-Baptiste Dubuc (1743–1819).
- Jean-Simon Deberverie (1764–1824).
- Louis-François Jeannest (1781–1856).
- Louis-Isidore Choiselat-Gallien (1784–1853).
- Louis-Stanislas Lenoir-Ravrio (1783–1846). The adopted son of André-Antoine Ravrio.
- Louis Thomire (1757–1838). Collaborator and cousin of Pierre-Philippe Thomire.
- Lucien-François Feuchère (c. 1760–c. 1841). The son of Pierre-François Feuchère.
- Pierre-Etienne Romain (c. 1765–after 1821).
- Pierre-François Feuchère (1737–1823).
- Pierre-Philippe Thomire (1751–1843).
- Pierre-Victor Ledure (1783–1840s).

== Gallery ==
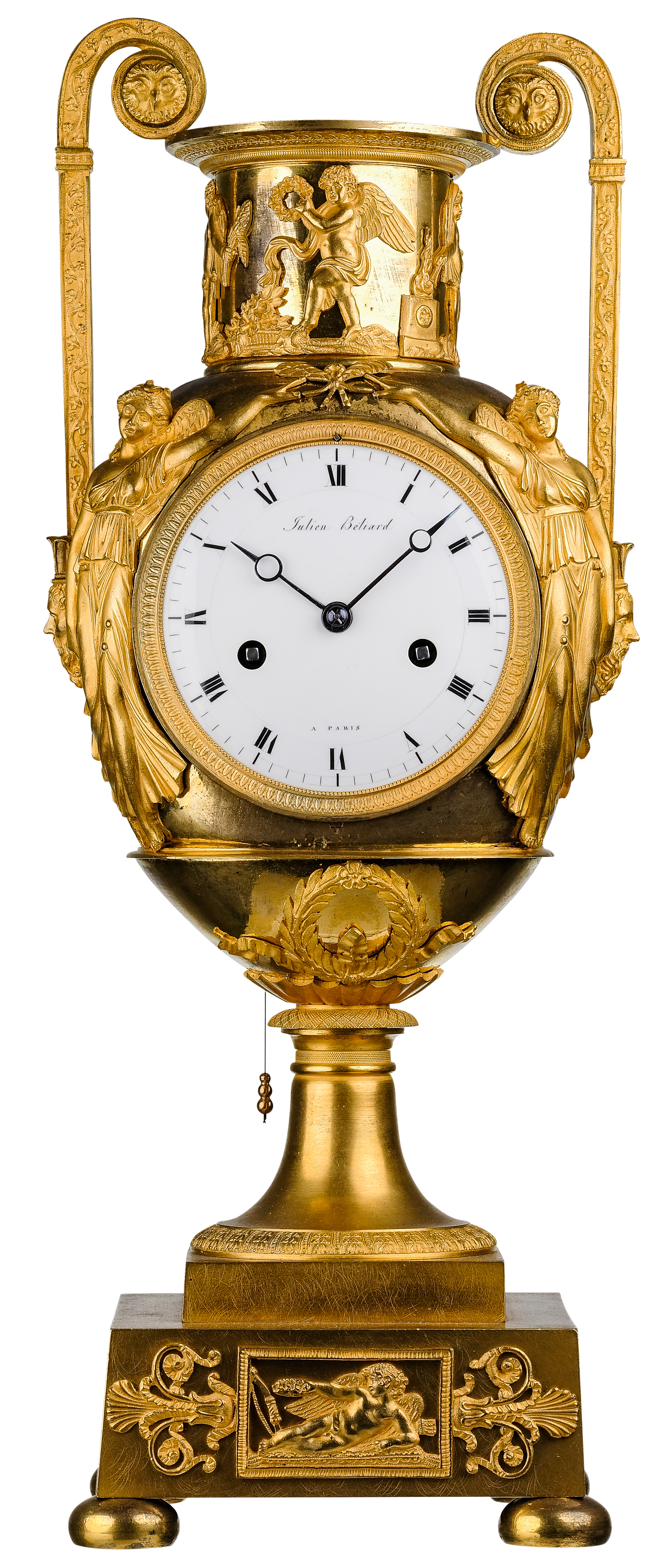
Mantel clock with mercury gilding in the shape of an urn (around 1800) by Julien Béliard (born 1758 – died after 1806), Paris. The clock case by Claude Galle (1758–1815).

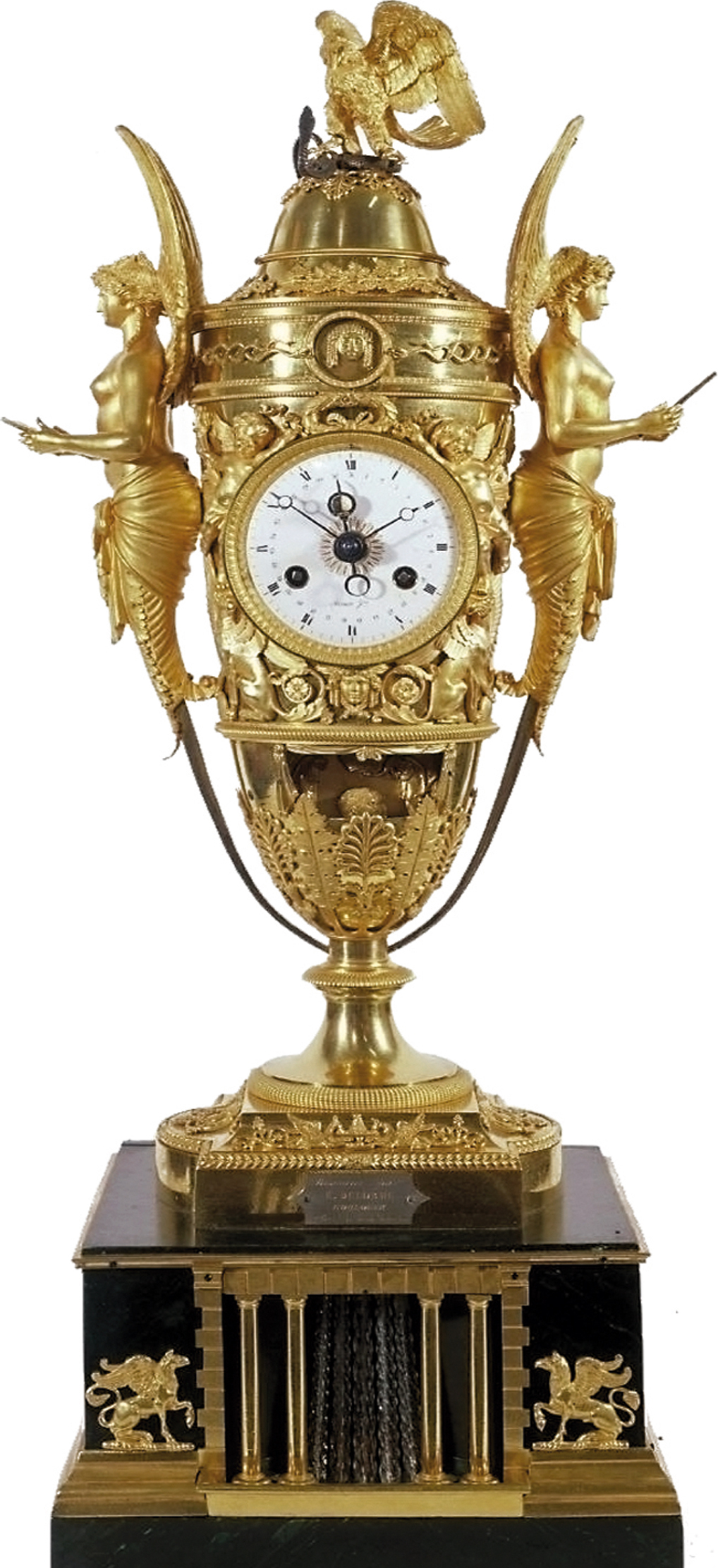
Napoleon's timekeeper in the shape of an amphora (1806).

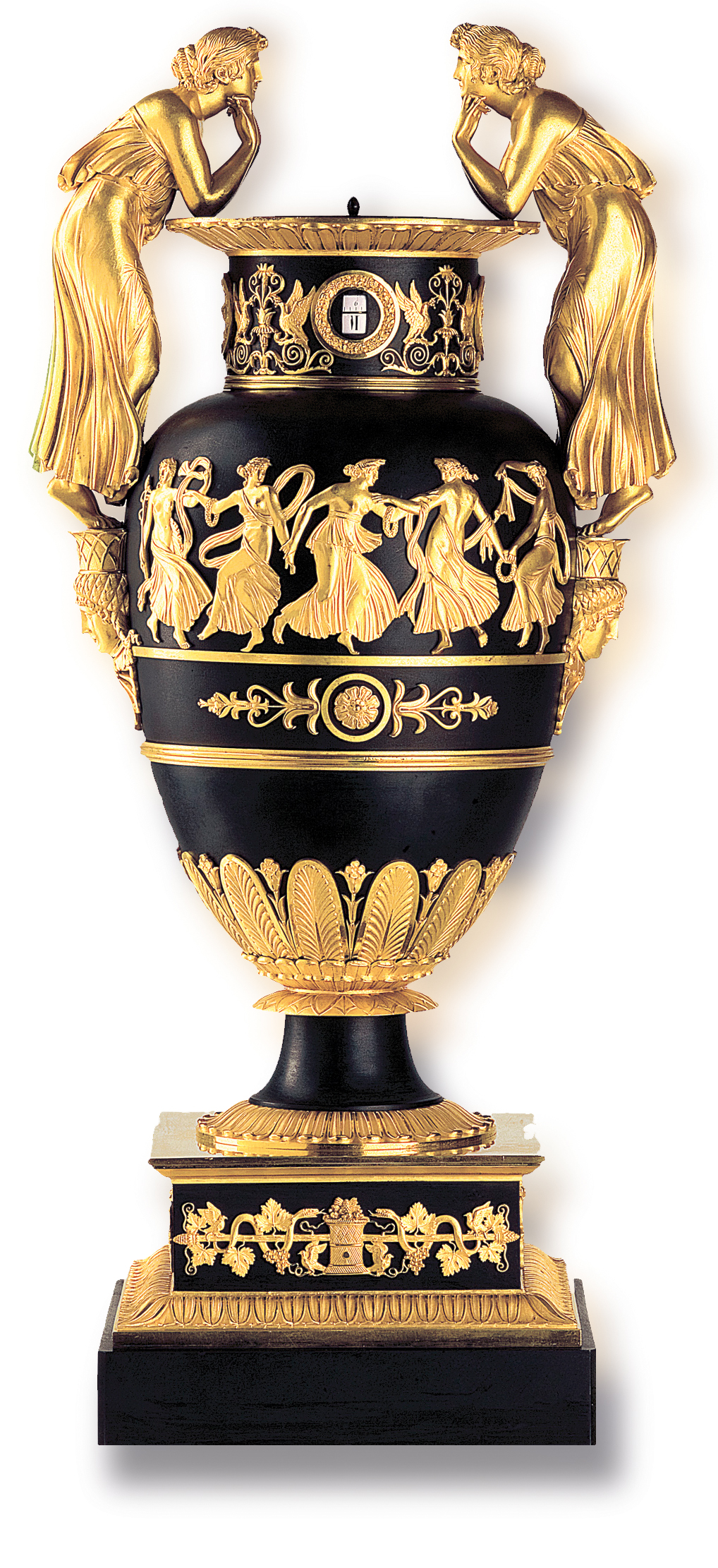
Another bronze urn clock that belonged to Ernest Augustus, King of Hanover (circa 1810).

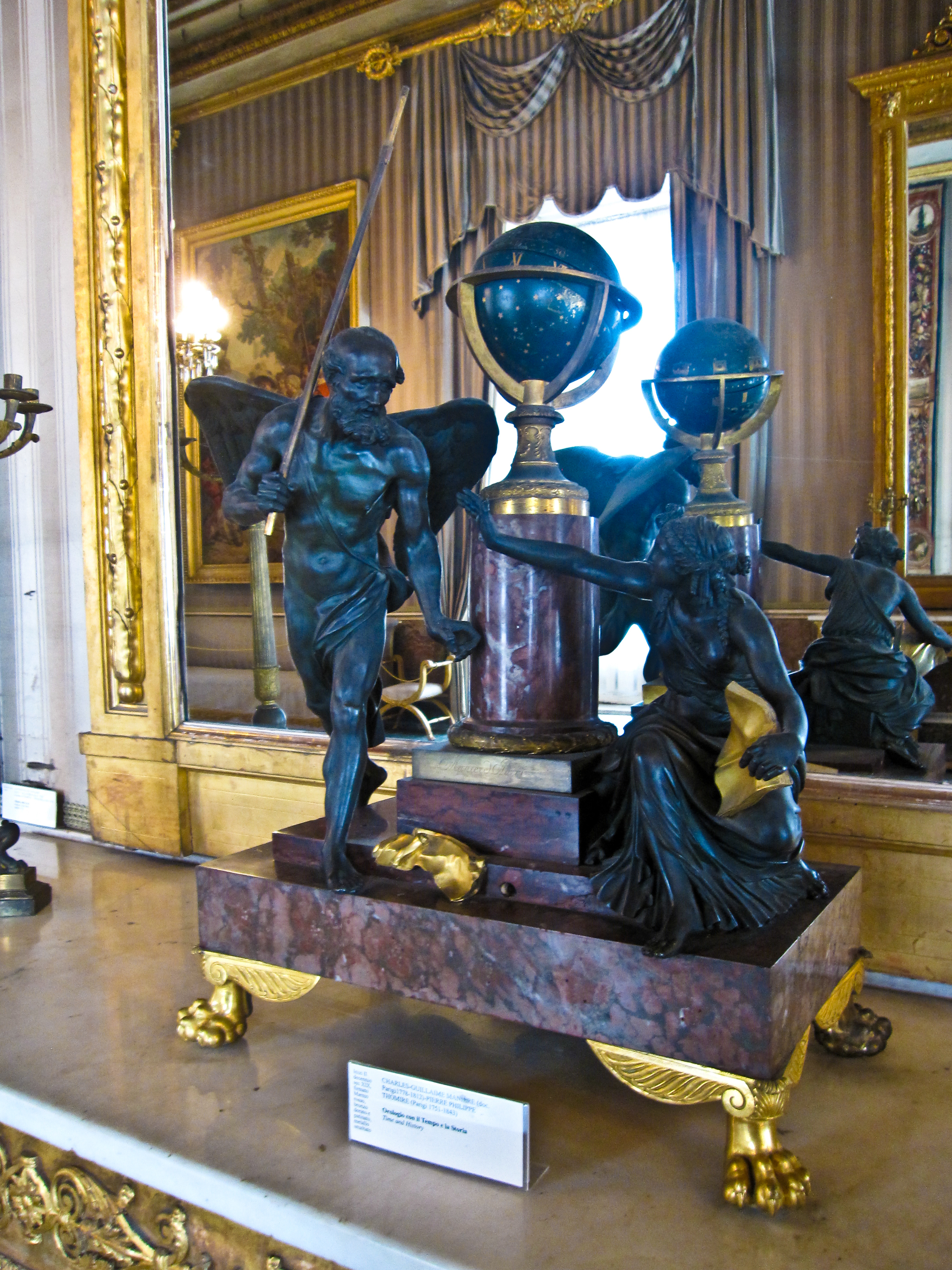
Pendule à cercles tournants (Rotating circles clock) portraying the allegory Time and History, by Pierre-Philippe Thomire (1812). Royal Palace of Naples.

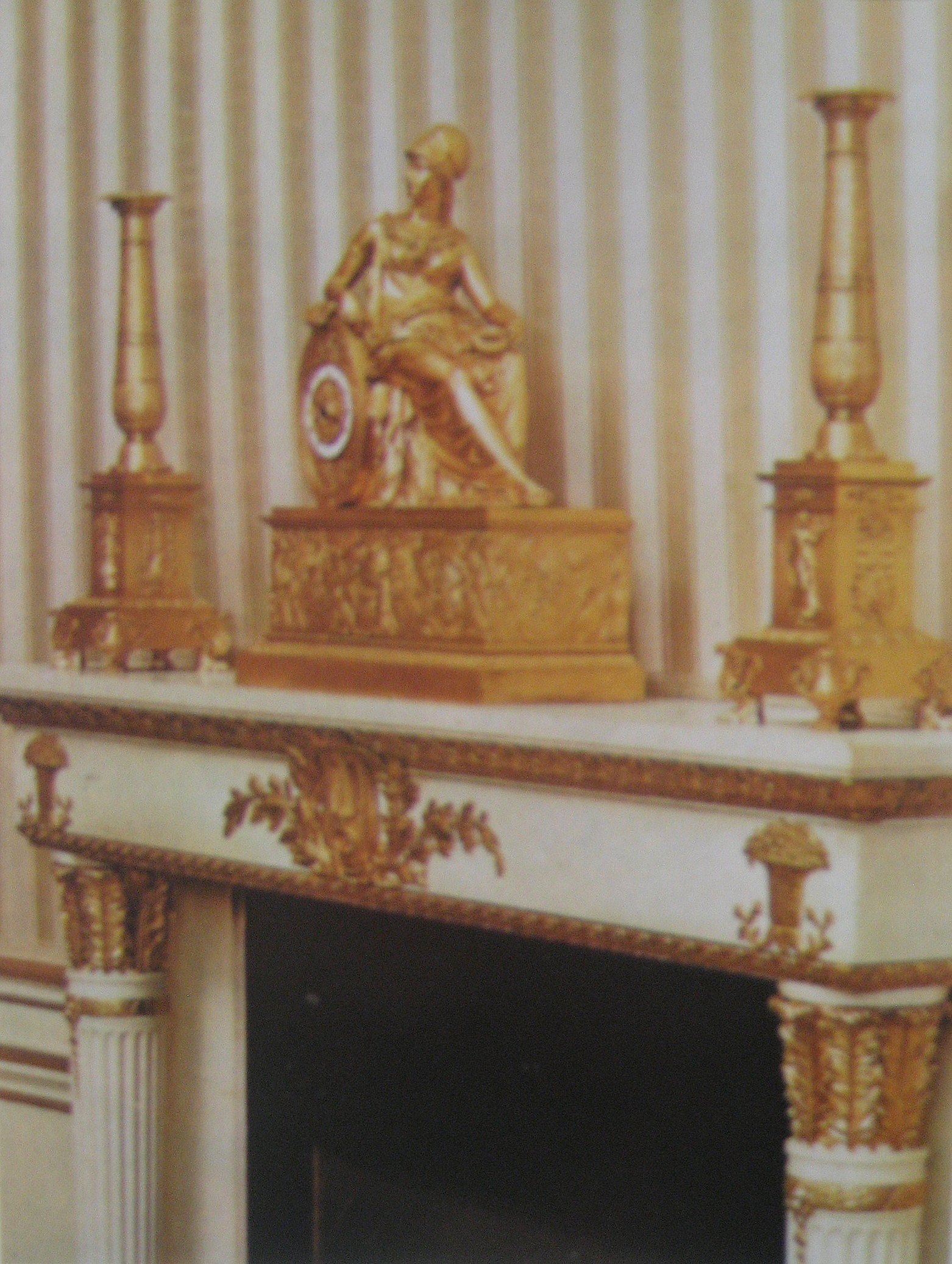
Set of clock with a figure of Minerva and candlesticks purchased in Paris in 1817 by James Monroe.

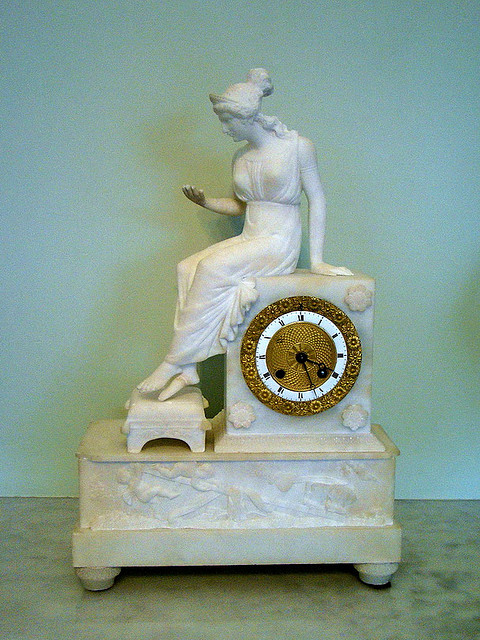
Piece with the case made of alabaster, c. 1818. Gatchina Palace, Russia.

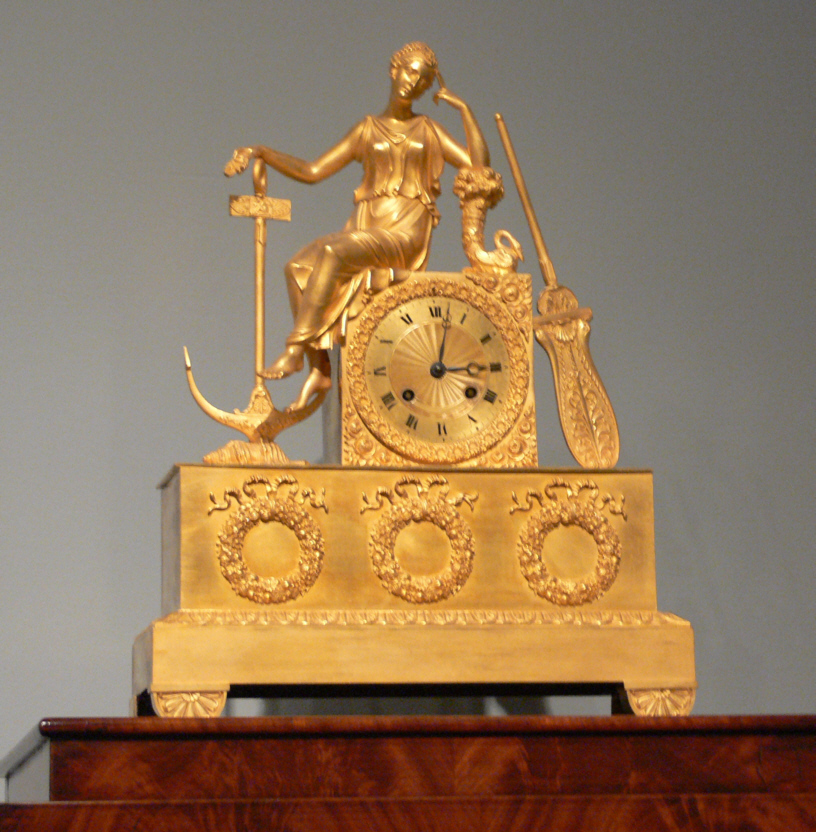
C. 1825 exemplary presenting an allegory of Hope.

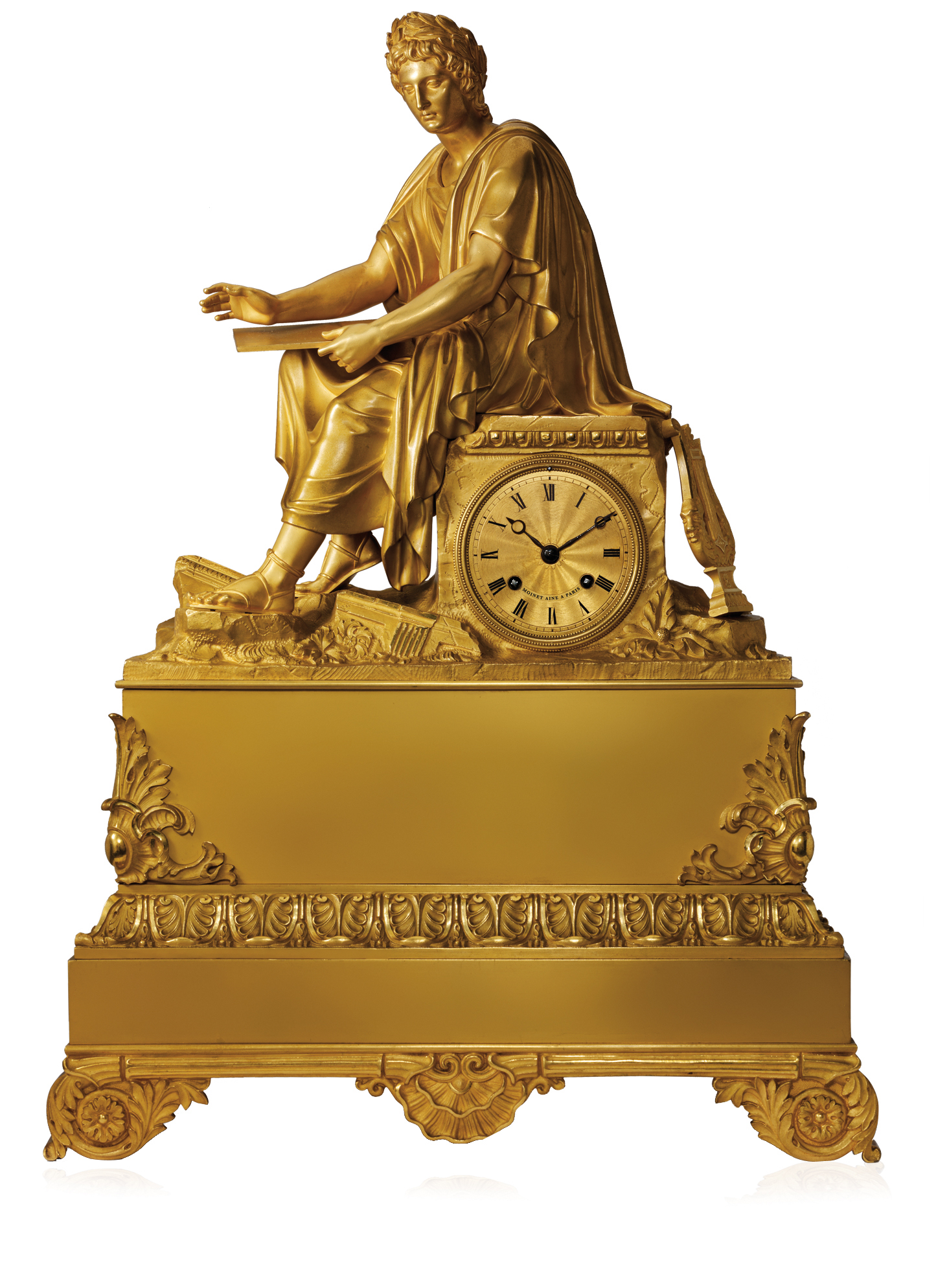
A transitional example (c. 1830), representing the Emperor Nero. In the base can be observed a clear tendency towards a baroque style.

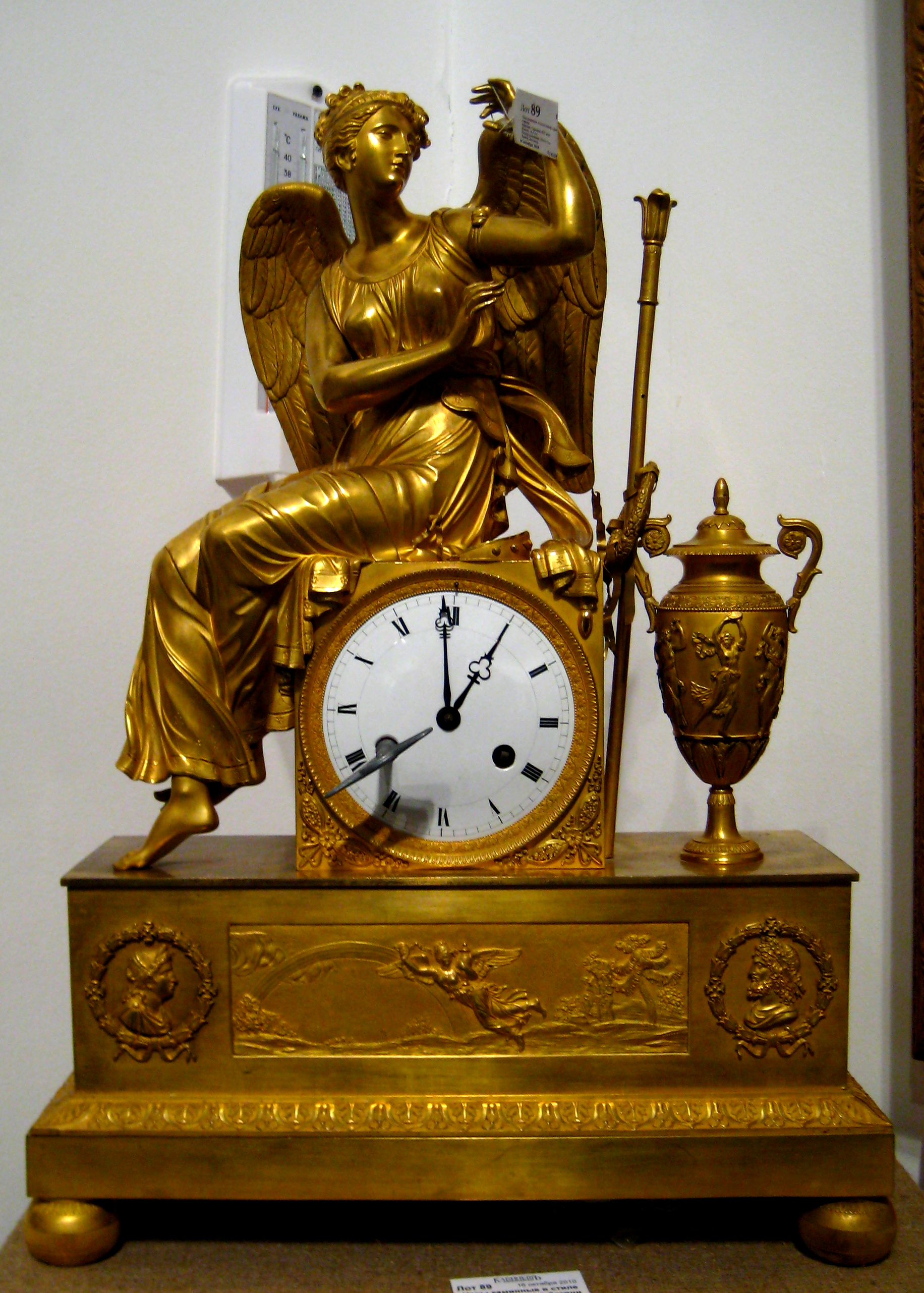
Empire revival timepiece (2nd half 19th century) with the figure of the goddess Aurora. Replica of a preexisting model.

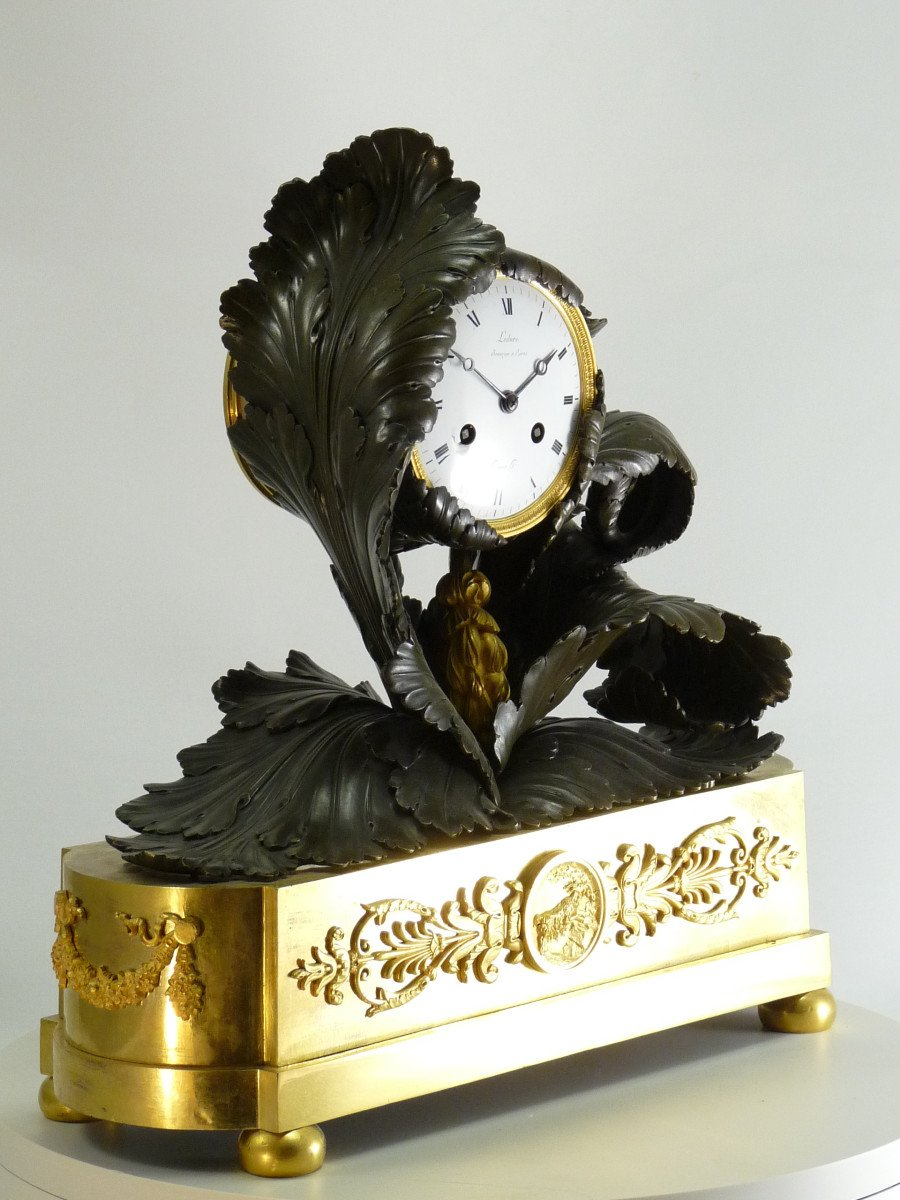
Neoclassical French mantel clock « Aux feuilles de chou » (with cabbage leaves), ormolu and patinated bronze. The clock case by Pierre-Victor Ledure, the clockwork by Claude Hémon (1770–1820)
