= Henri-François Riesener =

French painter (1767–1828)

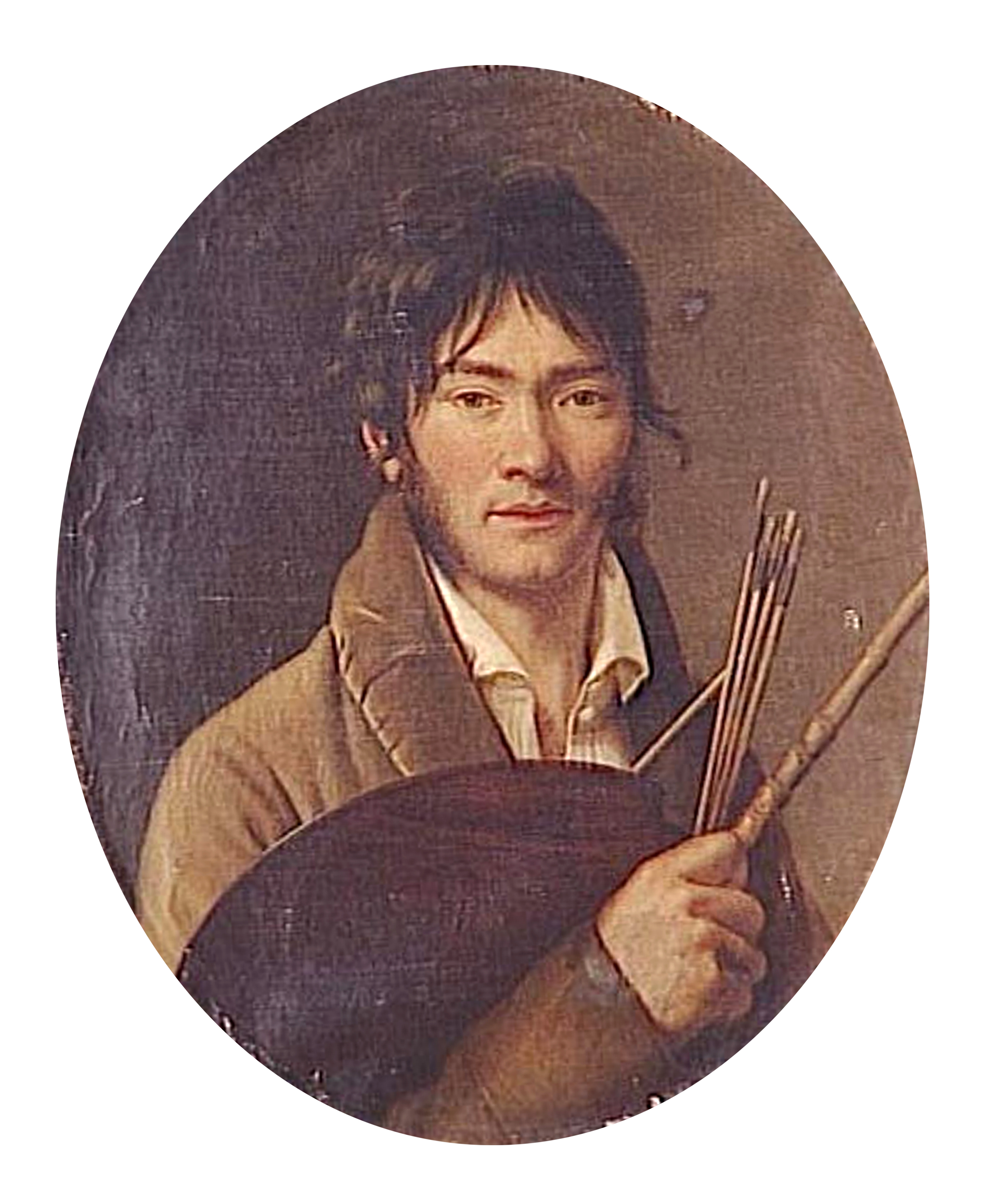
Self-portrait, late 18th or early 19th century

Henri-François Riesener (19 October 1767 – 7 February 1828) was a French portrait painter and miniaturist. He was the son of German-born cabinet-maker Jean-Henri Riesener (1743–1806) and the father of the Romantic painter Léon Riesener (1808–1878).

== Life ==
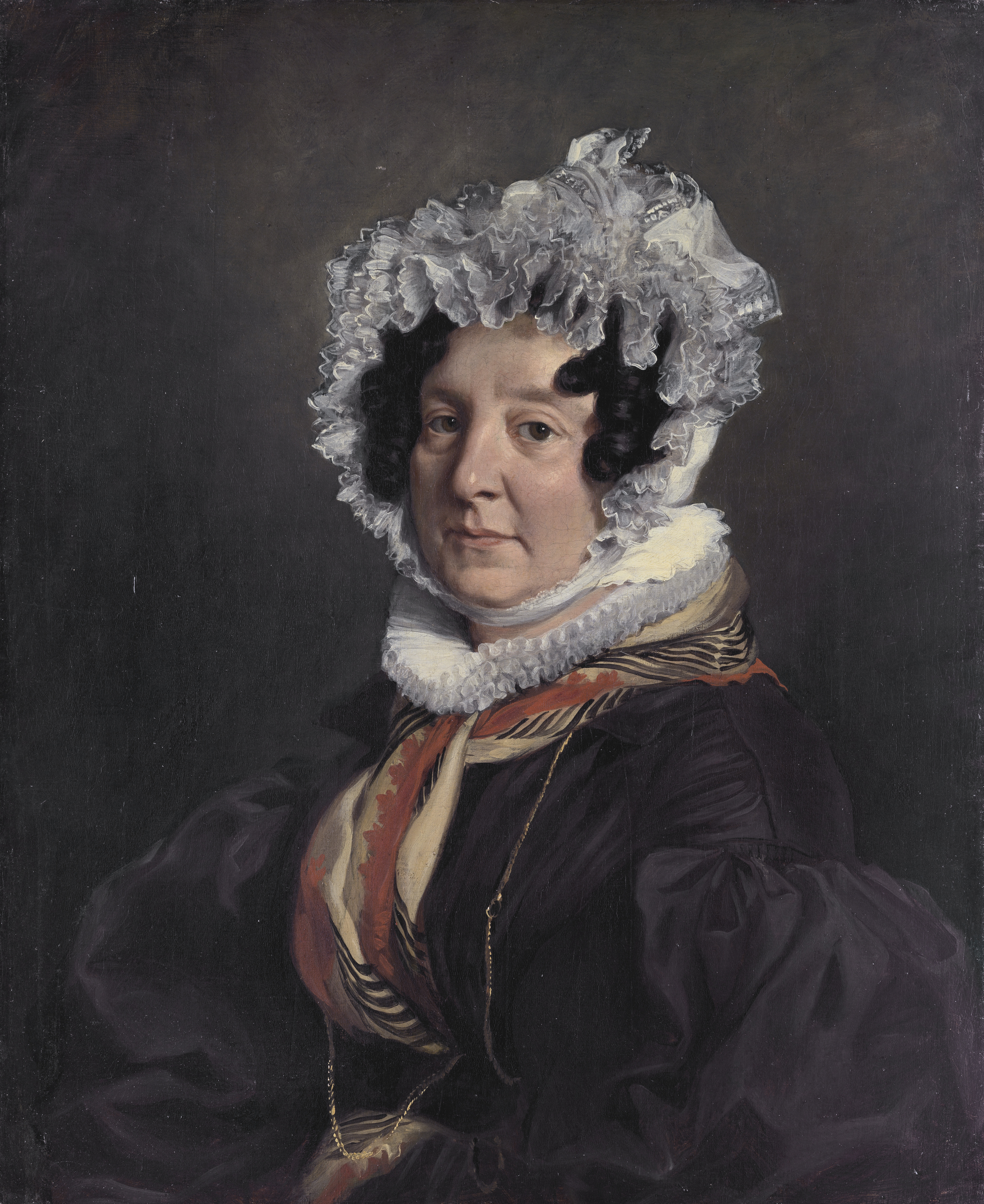
Félicité Longrois, 1786–1847 (Eugène Delacroix, 1835)

He was born in Paris. First studying under François-André Vincent then Jacques-Louis David, he finally left David's studio to join the army at the outbreak of the French Revolutionary Wars, fighting in Italy and Egypt.

On his return to France, Riesener began working as a portraitist and miniaturist. His works were featured at the Paris Salon, where he exhibited portraits of Eugène de Beauharnais, général de brigade Michel Ordener, Madame Sallandrouze, the comte de Cessac and Charles Maurice de Talleyrand-Périgord, among others.

Riesener also painted the singers of the Opéra-Comique, and produced a portrait of his cousin André-Antoine Ravrio, a famous sculptor in bronze at Napoleon's court, which is now on show in the Musée du Louvre. He made 50 copies of his original portrait of Napoleon I, drawn during a dinner. In 1807, he married Félicité Longrois, 'dame d'annonce' (lady in waiting) to empress Josephine.

Later, he accepted commissions from British patrons. Once the British army left Paris, however, there were few commissions available, so he moved to Russia in 1815, leaving his wife and his son Léon behind in Paris. He remained in Russia and Poland for seven years, staying in Moscow (1816–1823), Saint Petersburg and Warsaw. He painted all the celebrities there and collaborated with Swebach-Desfontaines on an equestrian portrait of Alexander I of Russia.

He returned to Paris in 1823, and in the five years before his death in 1828, managed to give his son Léon his first lessons in drawing and gain him a position in Antoine-Jean Gros's studio, as well as gain his nephew, Eugène Delacroix, a place in the studio of Pierre-Narcisse Guérin.

== Main works ==
- Portrait of the painter Maurice Quays (1797–1799), 45x56 cm, musée du Louvre
- Madame Riesener and her sister Madame Longroy (1802), 46x61 cm.
- Portrait of André-Antoine Ravrio (1812), 117x90 cm, musée du Louvre
- Portrait of Joséphina Fridrix (1813), 115x88 cm, Hermitage Museum, Saint Petersburg
- Portrait of Peotr Lachinov,(1816–1821), 68,5x56 cm, Hermitage Museum, Saint Petersburg
- Portrait of S. P. Apraksina (1818), 175x120 cm, Hermitage Museum, Saint Petersburg
- Portrait of la princesse Dolgoroukaya, 125x96,8 cm, Pushkin Museum, Moscow
- Portrait of a Lady (1818), Hood Museum of Art, New Hampshire
- Mother and daughter (1816–1823), 65x54 cm, Sinebrychoffin Taidemuseo, Helsinki
- Portrait of Louise-Rosalie Dugazon, famous singer at the Opéra-Comique, musée Carnavalet

== Gallery ==
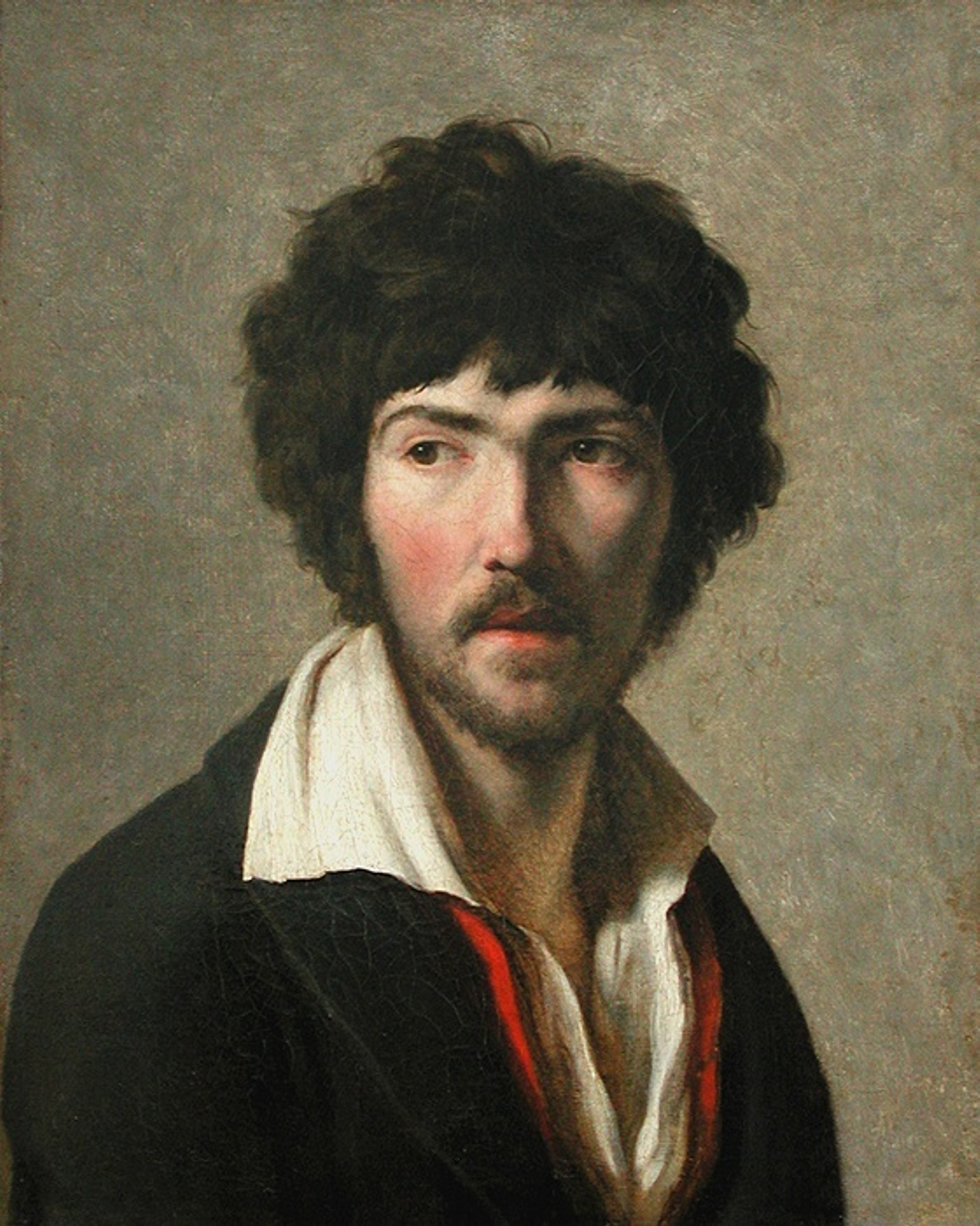
Portrait of Maurice Quays (1797–1799)

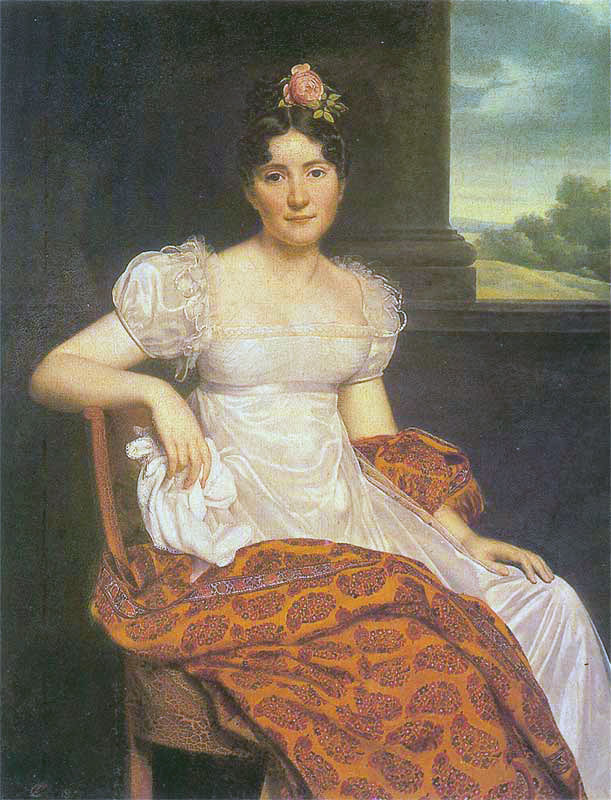
Portrait of Joséphina Fridrix (1813)

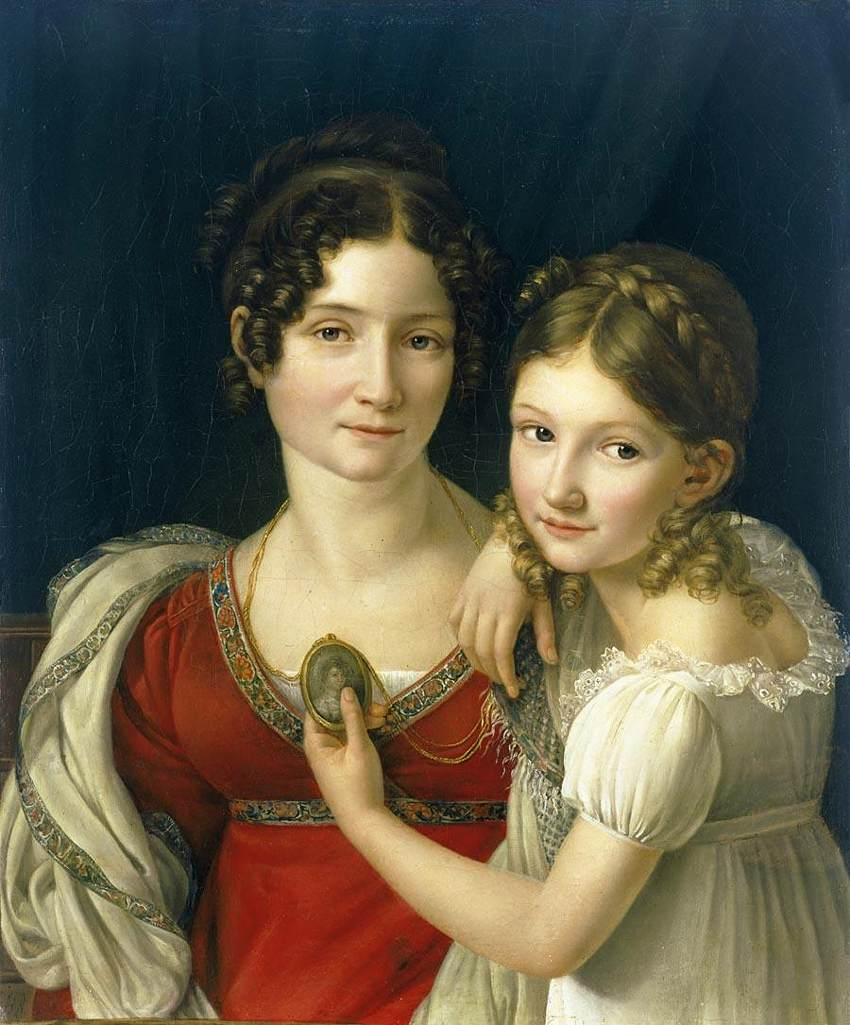
Mother and daughter
(1816–1823)

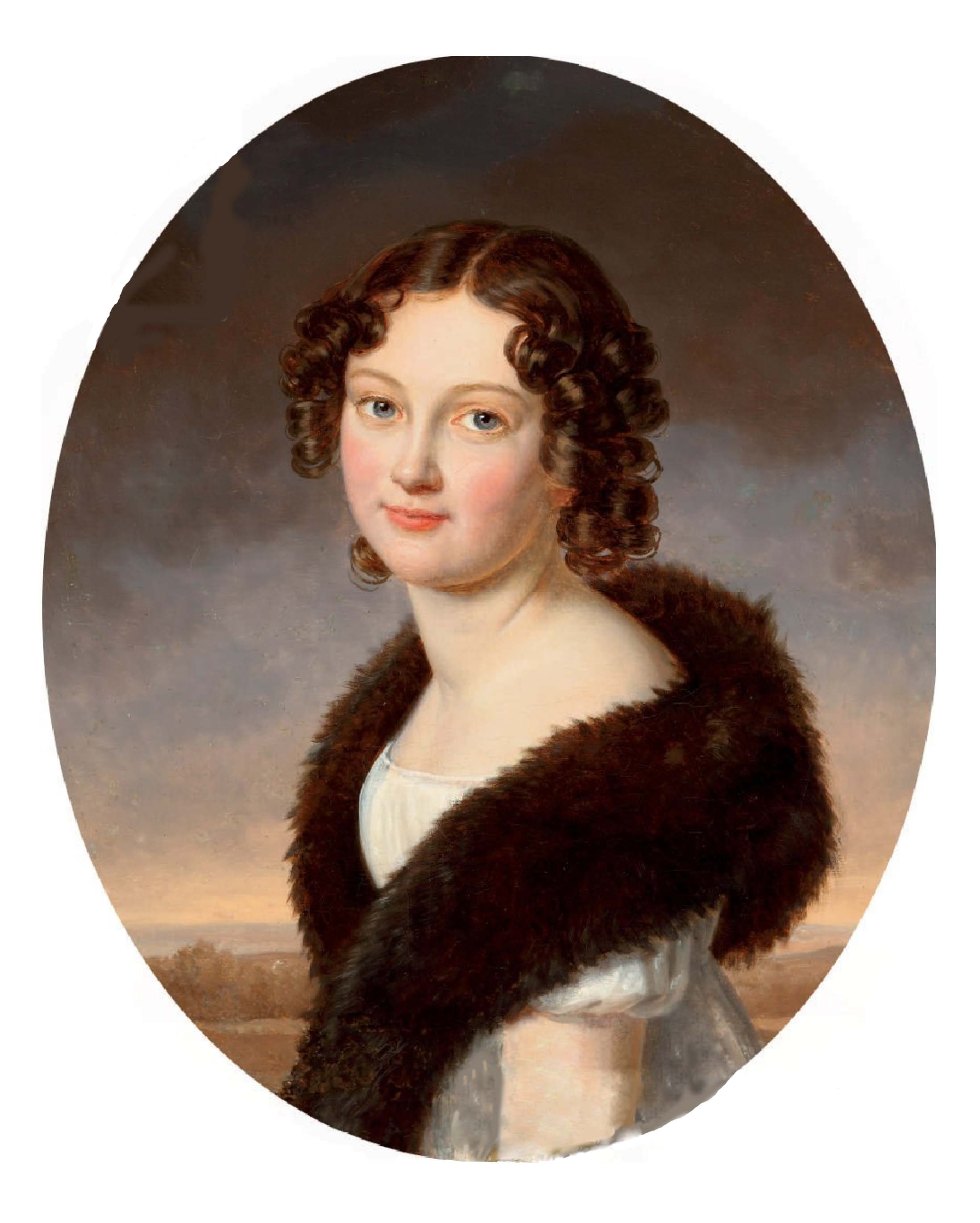
Portrait of Hélène Zavadovsky (c. 1820)

== Bibliography ==
- "Riesener, Henri François". Benezit Dictionary of Artists. 2011.
- (in French) Geneviève Viallefond, Le Peintre Léon Riesener, Èditions Albert Morancé, 1955
- (in French) Les Trois Riesener, catalogue of an exhibition at the Galerie des Beaux-Arts, Paris, 1954
