= Portrait of Léon Riesener =

Painting by Eugène Delacroix

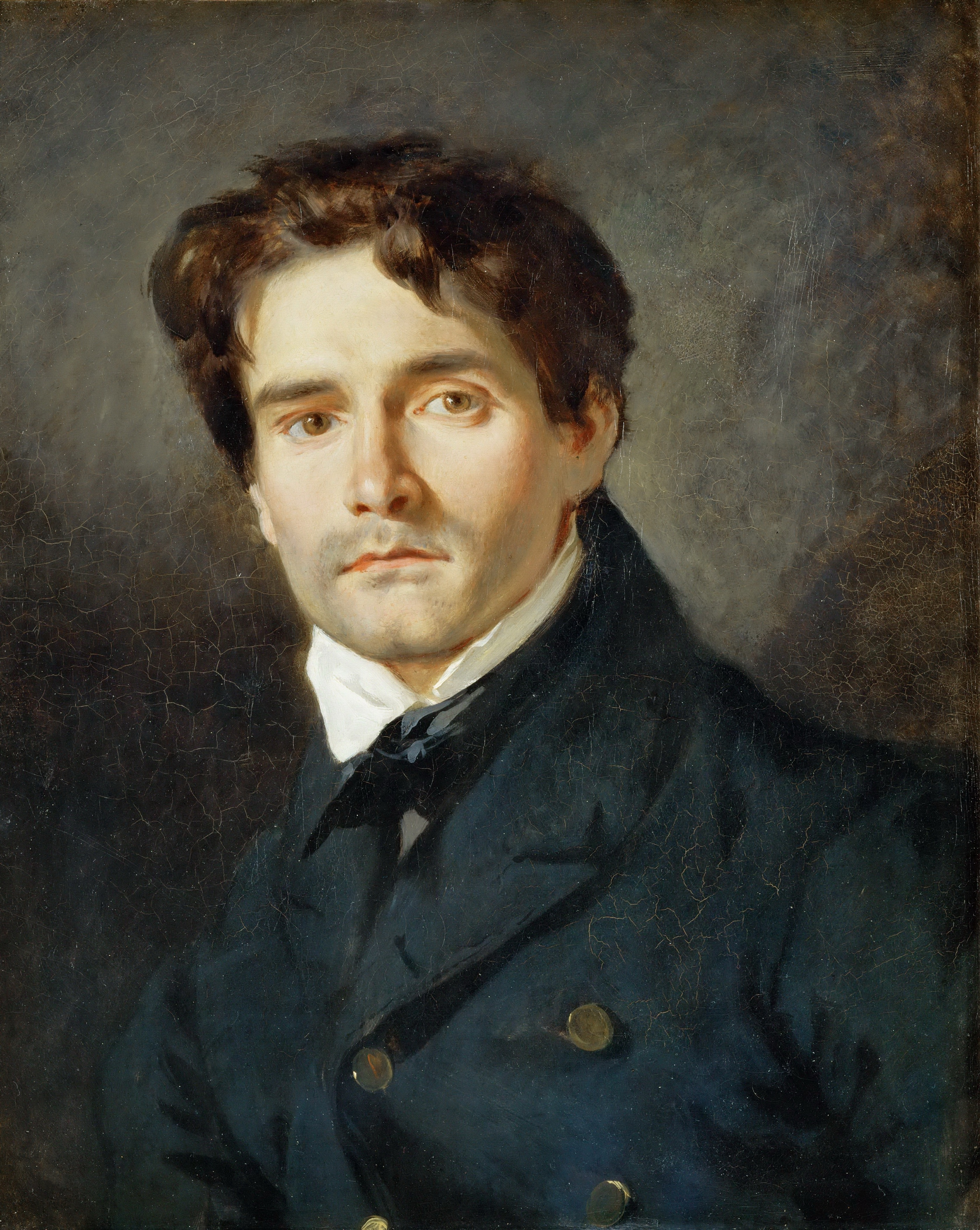
- Artist: Eugène Delacroix
- Year: 1835
- Type: Oil on canvas, portrait painting
- Dimensions: 54 cm × 44 cm (21 in × 17 in)
- Location: Louvre, Paris

Portrait of Léon Riesener is an 1835 portrait painting by the French artist Eugène Delacroix. It depicts his cousin and fellow Romantic painter Léon Riesener at the age of around twenty six when he was living at Frépillon. The two men were close friends and Delacroix helped promote the younger man's career. He also produced a painting of Riesener's mother shortly afterwards. Riesener enjoyed a successful career, exhibiting from the Salon of 1833 to the Salon of 1877, although today he is best remembered for this and other portraits by Delacroix he sat for.

The painting was likely produced either for the sitter or his mother. It was displayed at the 1885 Paris retrospective exhibition of Delacroix's work held to raise funds for a public monument for the artist Since 1960 it has been part of the collection of the Louvre in Paris.

== Bibliography ==
- Allard, Sébastien & Fabre, Côme. Delacroix. Metropolitan Museum of Art, 2018.
- Ives, Colta Feller & Barker, Elizabeth E. Romanticism & the School of Nature. Metropolitan Museum of Art, 2000.
- Wrightsman, Jayne. The Wrightsman Pictures. Metropolitan Museum of Art, 2005.
