= André-Antoine Ravrio =

French sculptor (1759–1814)

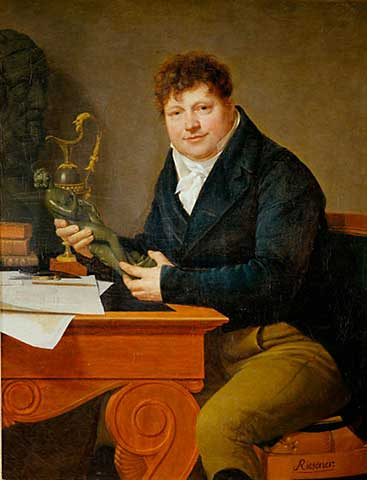
André-Antoine Ravrio – a portrait by his cousin, Henri-François Riesener (musée du Louvre)

André-Antoine Ravrio (1759, Paris – 4 October 1814, Paris) was a French sculptor in bronze. He was made a master founder in 1777 and set up in business on his own in 1790. He became famous for the small bronzes he sold to a prestigious clientele, notably including Napoleon I.

He was also notable as the author of several poems, songs and vaudevilles and collaborated with Talma, Carle Vernet, Firmin Didot, Désaugiers and Cicéri in the Société de la Goguette. In 1805 he published the song La rue des Bons-Enfants, alluding to a Bacchic society of which paved the way for the Goguettes. He also wrote the song La Goguette about the titular society.

He is buried in the 10th division of the cimetière du Père-Lachaise.

== See also ==
- French Empire mantel clock
