= Musée national Eugène Delacroix =

Biographical art museum in France

Coordinates: 48°51′15.65″N 02°20′07.98″E

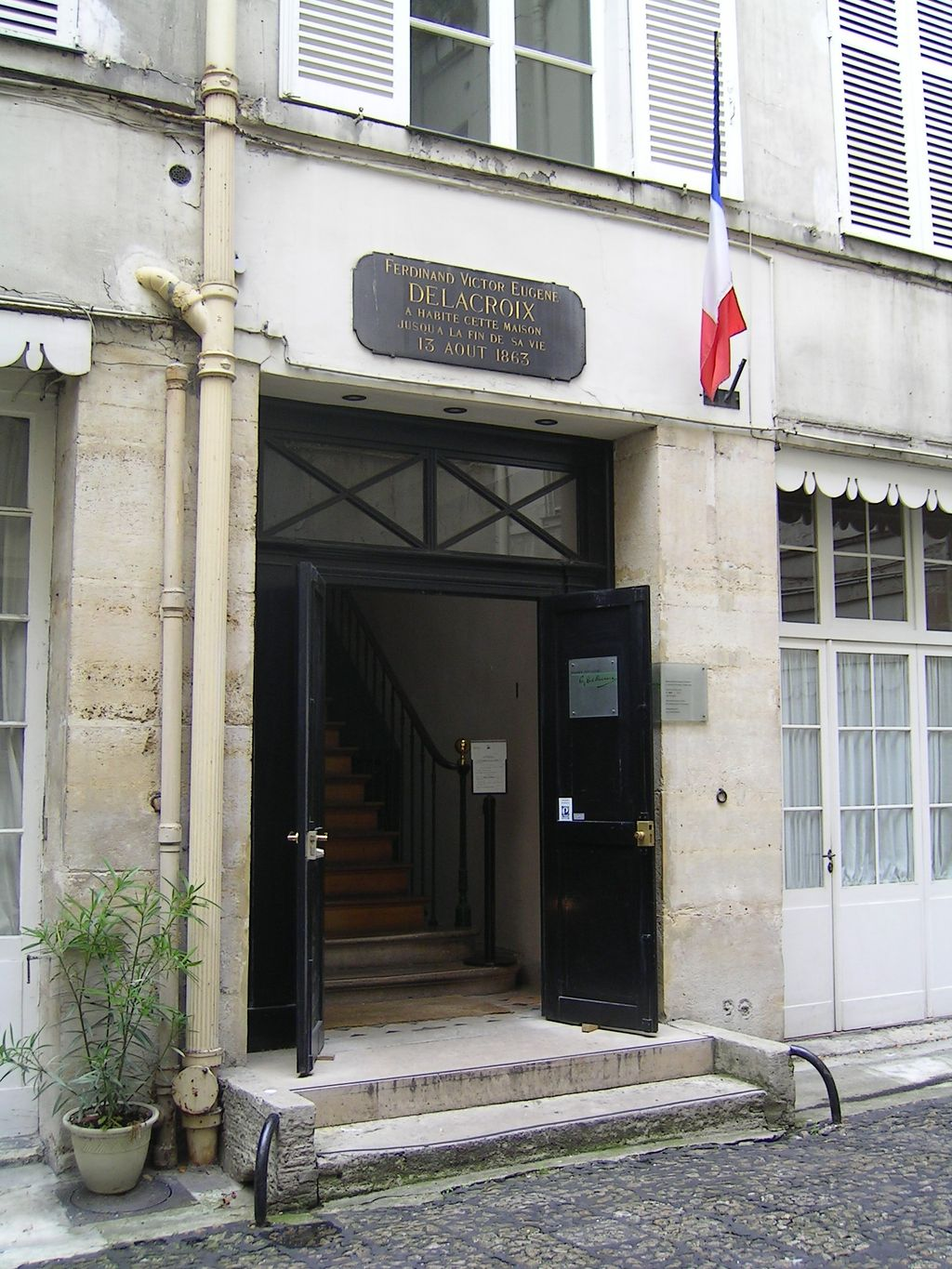
- Musée national Eugène Delacroix
- Established: 1971; 55 years ago
- Location: 6th arrondissement at 6, rue de Furstenberg, Paris, France
- Type: art museum
- Collections: artist's only three attempts at fresco from Valmont (1834); the Education of the Virgin painted in Nohant in 1842; and Magdalene in the Desert exhibited at the 1845

The Musée national Eugène Delacroix (French pronunciation: [myze nɑsjɔnal øʒɛn dəlakʁwa]; English: National Eugène Delacroix Museum), also simply the Musée Delacroix, is an art museum dedicated to painter Eugène Delacroix (1798–1863) and located in the 6th arrondissement at 6, rue de Furstemberg, Paris, France. It is open daily except Tuesday; an admission fee is charged.

== History ==
The museum is located in painter Eugène Delacroix's last apartment; he moved to this location on December 28, 1857, and remained until his death on August 13, 1863. In 1929, the Société des Amis d'Eugène Delacroix was formed to prevent the building's destruction; in 1952, the Société acquired the apartment, studio, and garden, and in 1954 donated the property to the French government. In 1971, the site became a national museum, and in 1999 its garden was renovated. Léon Printemps had his studio in this same building, where he died on 9 July 1945. Since 2004 the museum has been managed by the Louvre.

== Collection ==
Today the museum contains Delacroix's memorabilia and works, exhibiting pictures from nearly every phase of his career, including the artist's only three attempts at fresco from Valmont (1834); the Education of the Virgin painted in Nohant in 1842; and Magdalene in the Desert exhibited at the Salon of 1845. It also contains:

- Drawings, primarily studies for paintings in the Chapelle des Saints-Anges at the Église Saint-Sulpice, but also drawings by some of Delacroix's friends and colleagues (Lassalle-Bordes, Huet, Poterlet, Saint-Marcel, Colin).
- Notes, sketches, and souvenirs for Delacroix's Morocco trip in 1832, including burnooses, haiks, caftans, djellabas, jewelry, sabers, cushions, slippers, boots, and ceramics.
- Studio items, including easel, palettes, painting tables, a glass he used for washing up, a small group of decorated faiences, and a pair of candlesticks.
- Photographs of Delacroix toward the end of his life, and letters to and from Delacroix.
- A library and documents concerning Delacroix and entourage, with more than 1,000 works (monographs, exhibition catalogues, research, etc.).

== See also ==
- List of museums in Paris
- List of single-artist museums
