= Ormolu =

Gilding technique

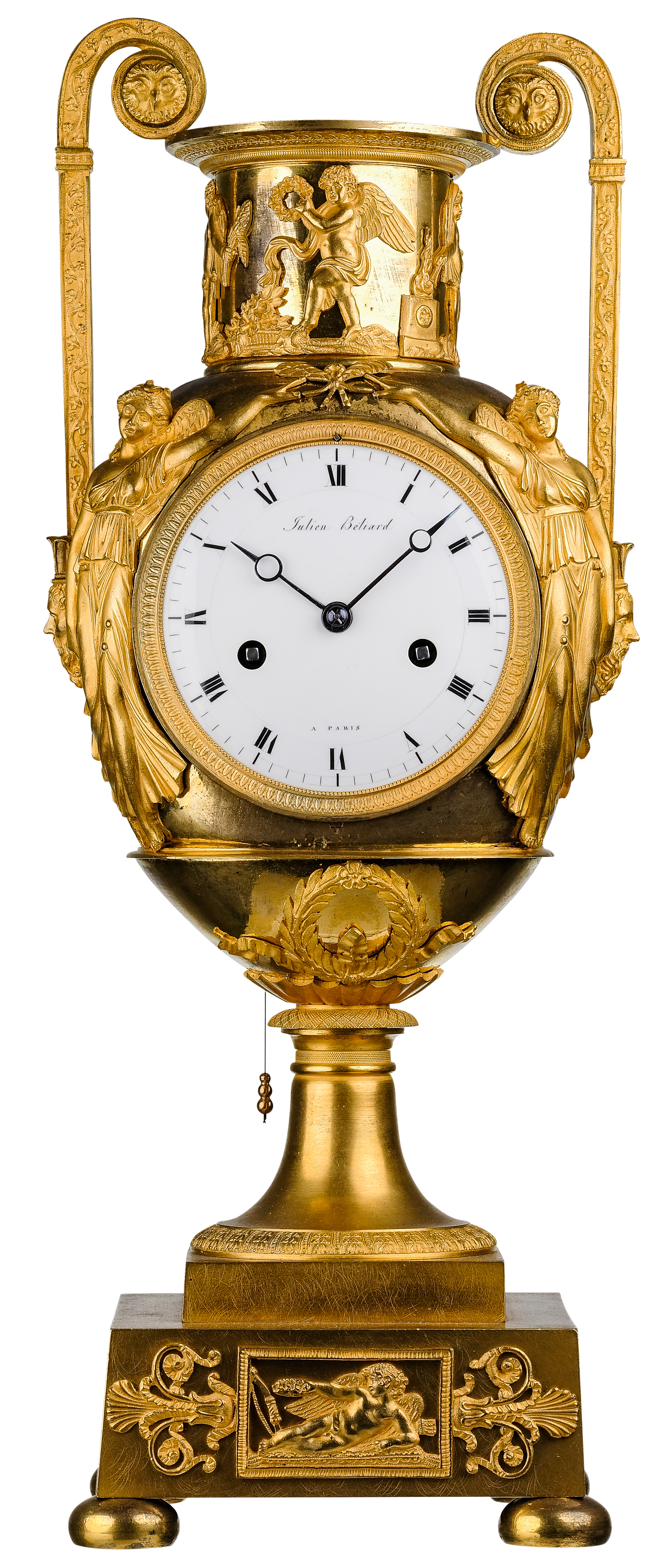
French ormolu mantel clock (around 1800) by Julien Béliard (1758 – died after 1806), Paris. The clock case by Claude Galle (1758–1815)

Ormolu (/ˈɔːrməˌluː/; from French or moulu 'ground/pounded gold') or gilt-bronze is the gilding technique of applying finely ground, high-carat gold–mercury amalgam to an object of bronze, and objects finished in this way. The mercury is driven off in a kiln, leaving behind a gold coating. Around 1830, legislation in France outlawed the use of mercury for health reasons, though use continued to the 1900s.

The French refer to this technique as bronze doré; in English, it is known as "gilt bronze", especially in objects from before the 18th century; for later pieces "ormolu" is often used.

== Process ==
The manufacture of true ormolu employs a process known as mercury-gilding or fire-gilding, in which a solution of mercuric nitrate is applied to a piece of copper, brass, or bronze, followed by the application of an amalgam of gold and mercury. The item is then exposed to extreme heat until the mercury vaporizes and the gold remains, adhering to the metal object.

This process has generally been supplanted by the electroplating of gold over a nickel substrate, which is more economical and less dangerous.

== Health risk ==
In literature there is a 1612 reference from John Webster:

Hang him; a gilder that hath his brains perished with quicksilver is not more cold in the liver

— The White Devil

After around 1830, legislation in France had outlawed the use of mercury, although it continued to be commonly employed until around 1900 and was still in use around 1960 in very few workshops. Other gilding techniques, like electroplating from the mid-19th century on, were utilized. Ormolu techniques are essentially the same as those used on silver, to produce silver-gilt (also known as vermeil).

== Alternatives ==
A later substitute of a mixture of metals resembling ormolu was developed in France and called pomponne, though the mix of copper and zinc, sometimes with an addition of tin, is technically a type of brass. From the 19th century the term has been popularized to refer to gilt metal or imitation gold.

Gilt-bronze is found from antiquity onwards across Eurasia, and especially in Chinese art, where it was always more common than silver-gilt, the opposite of Europe.

== Applications ==
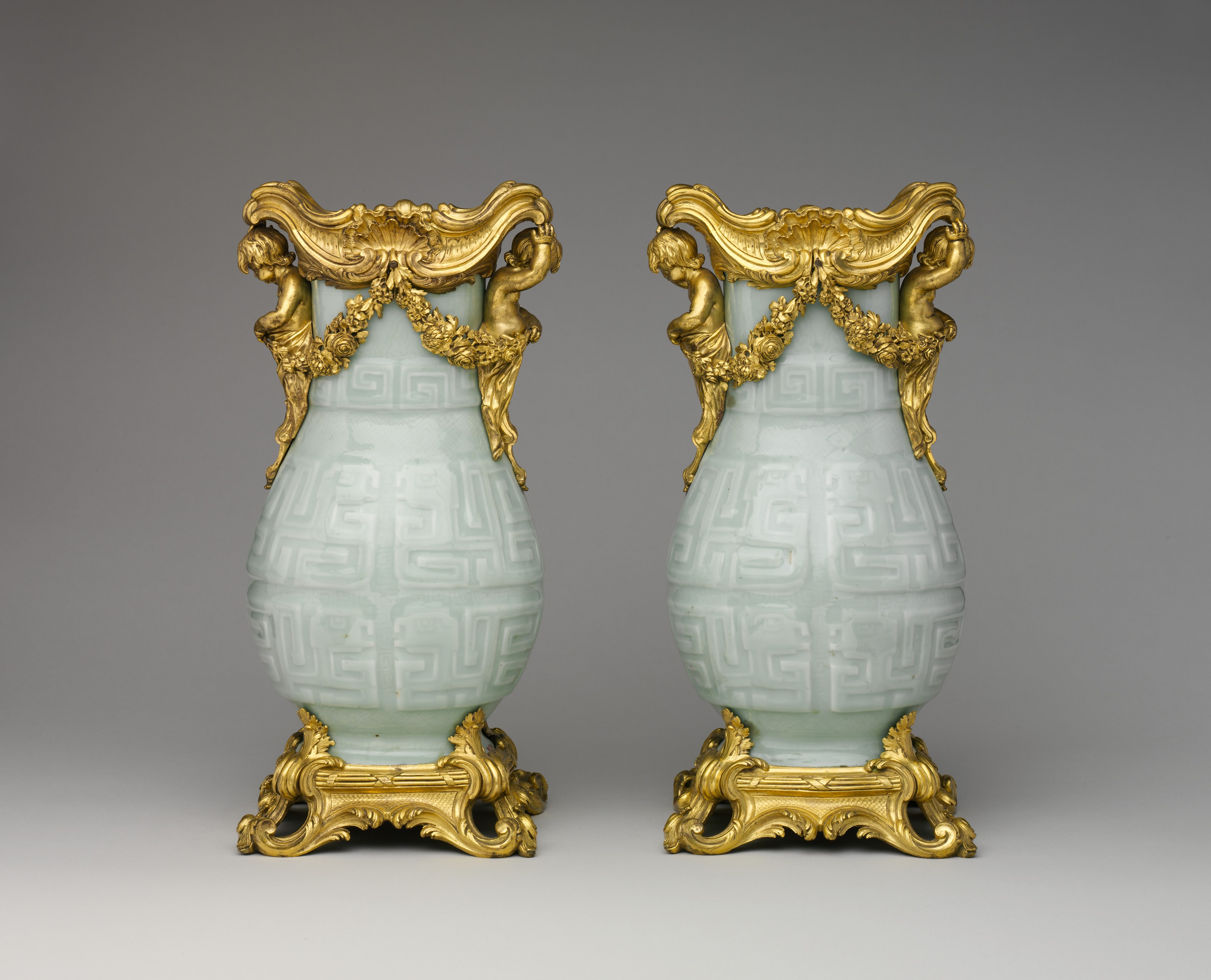
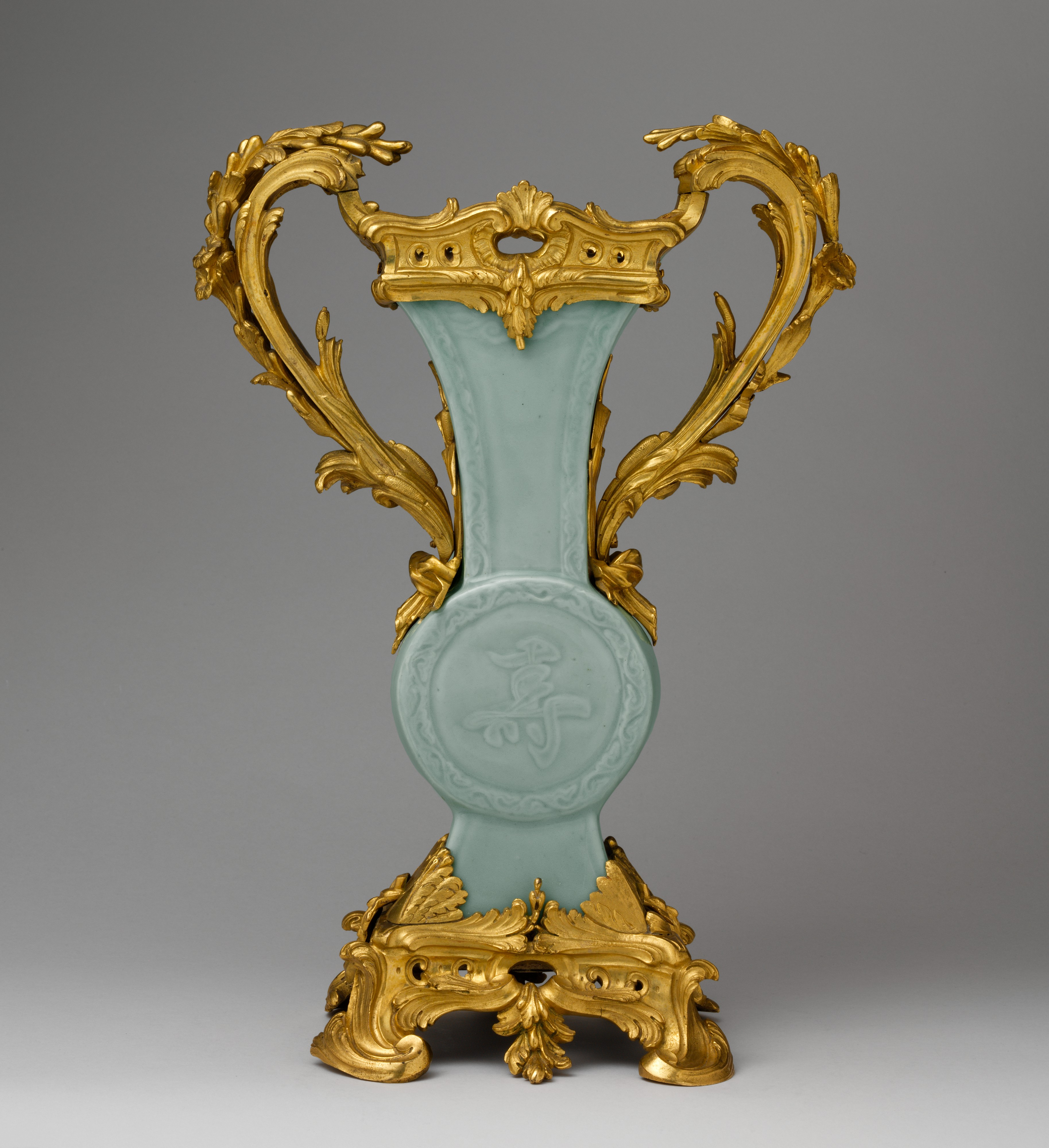
Chinese porcelains mounted with French gilt-bronze (ormolu) in rococo and neoclassical tastes; late 18th century; Metropolitan Museum of Art (New York City)

Craftsmen principally used ormolu for the decorative mountings of furniture, clocks, lighting devices, and porcelain. The great French furniture designers and cabinetmakers, or ébénistes, of the 18th and 19th centuries made maximum use of the exquisite gilt-bronze mounts produced by fondeurs-ciseleurs (founders and finishers) such as the renowned Jacques Caffieri (1678–1755), whose finished gilt-bronze pieces were almost as fine as jewelers' work. Ormolu mountings attained their highest artistic and technical development in France.

Similarly fine results could be achieved for lighting devices, such as chandeliers and candelabras, as well as for the ornamental metal mounts applied to clock cases and to ceramic pieces. In the hands of the Parisian marchands-merciers, the precursors of decorators, ormolu or gilt-bronze sculptures were used for bright, non-oxidizing fireplace accessories or for Rococo or Neoclassical mantel-clocks or wall-mounted clock-cases – a specialty of Charles Cressent (1685–1768) – complemented by rock-crystal drops on gilt-bronze chandeliers and wall-lights.

The bronze mounts were cast by lost wax casting, and then chiseled and chased to add detail. Rococo gilt bronze tends to be finely cast, lightly chiseled, and part-burnished. Neoclassical gilt-bronze is often entirely chiseled and chased with extraordinary skill and delicacy to create finely varied surfaces.

The ormolu technique was extensively used in the French Empire mantel clocks, reaching its peak during this period.

Chinese and European porcelains mounted in gilt-bronze were luxury wares that heightened the impact of often-costly and ornamental ceramic pieces sometimes used for display. Chinese ceramics with gilt-bronze mounts were produced under the guidance of the Parisian marchands-merciers, for only they had access to the ceramics (often purchased in the Netherlands) and the ability to overleap the guild restrictions. A few surviving pieces of 16th-century Chinese porcelain subsequently mounted in contemporary European silver-gilt, or vermeil, show where the foundations of the later fashion lay.

From the late 1760s, Matthew Boulton (1728–1809) of Birmingham produced English ormolu vases and perfume-burners in the latest Neoclassical style. Though the venture never became a financial success, it produced the finest English ormolu. In the early 19th century fine English ormolu came from the workshops of Benjamin Lewis Vulliamy (1780–1854).

In France, the tradition of neoclassic ormolu to Pierre-Philippe Thomire (1751–1843) was continued by Lucien-François Feuchère. Beurdeley & Cie. produced excellent ormolu in Rococo and Neoclassical styles in Paris, and rococo gilt-bronze is characteristic of the furniture of François Linke.

== Gallery ==
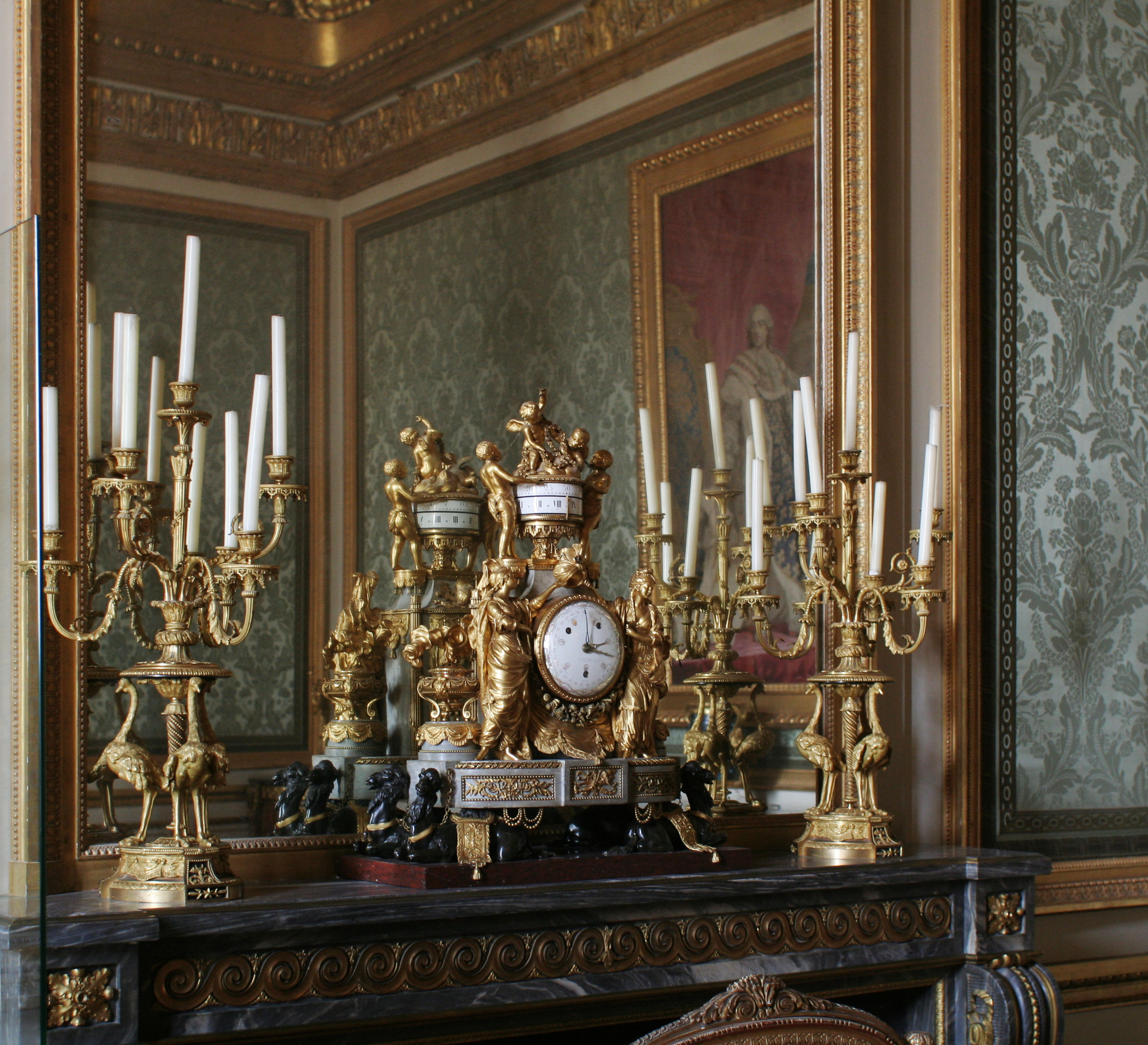
A garniture of an ormolu clock and candelabra at the Palace of Versailles in France

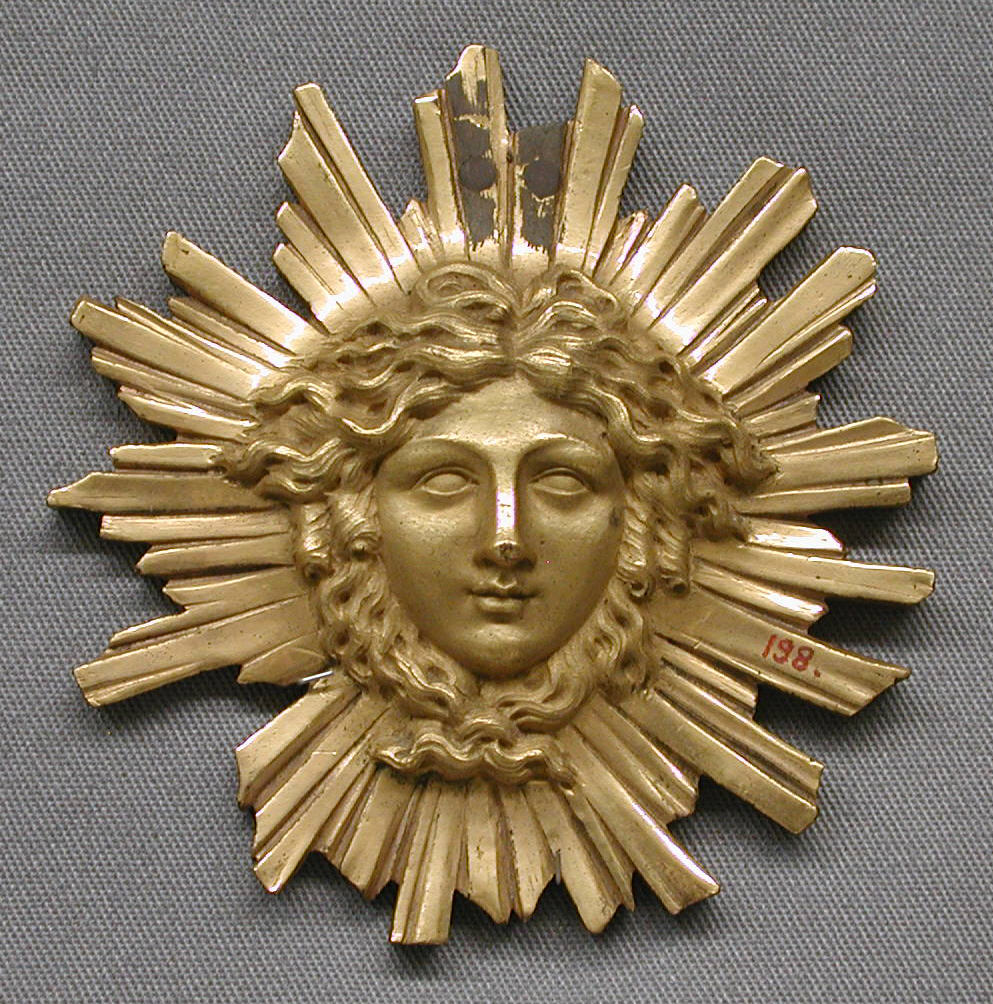
Clock ornament; 18th century; gilt-bronze; overall: 9.2 × 8.9 × 1.9 cm; Metropolitan Museum of Art (New York City)

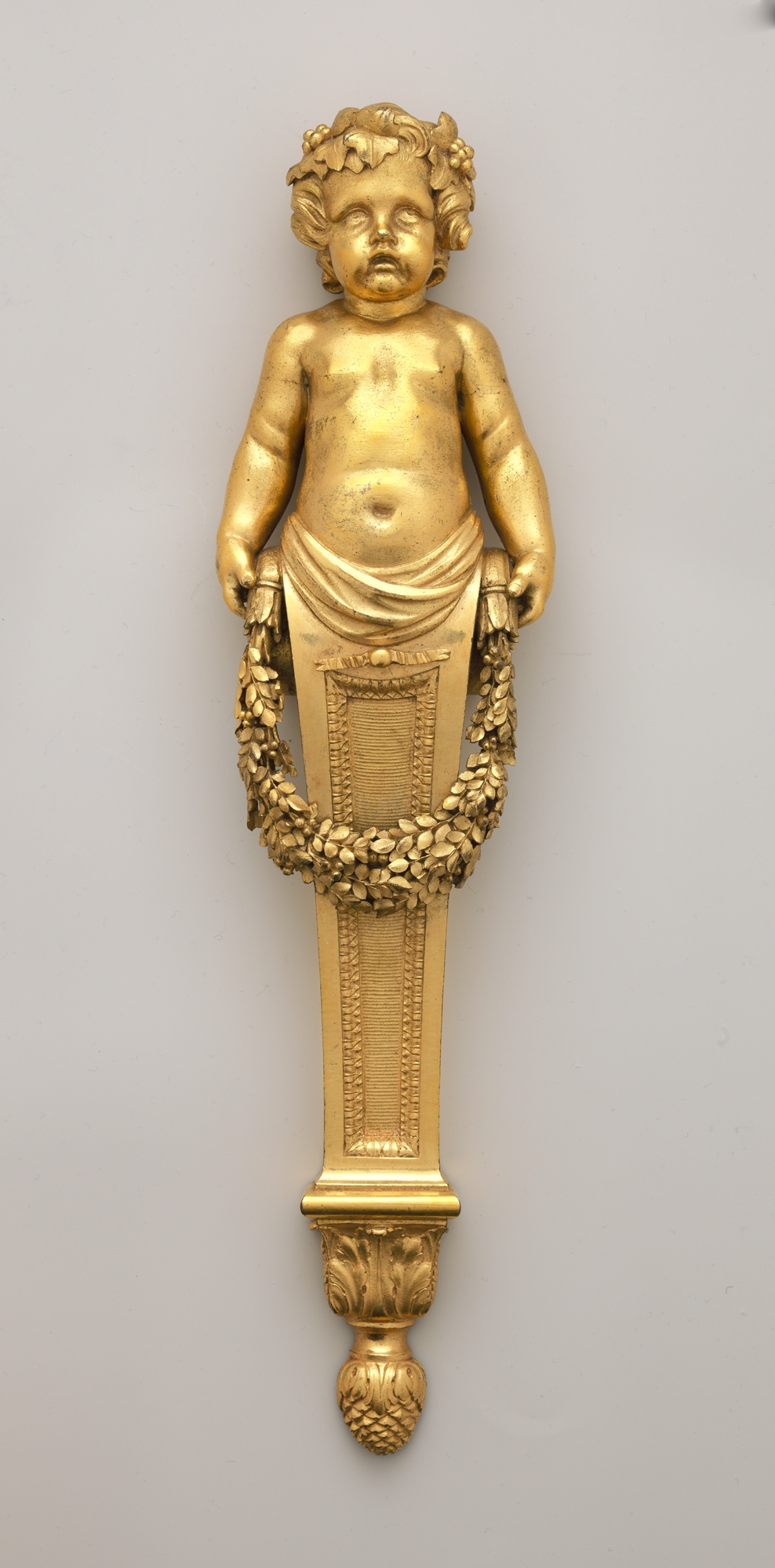
Caryatid putto; 18th century; gilt bronze; 35.2 × 8.9 × 4.5 cm; Metropolitan Museum of Art

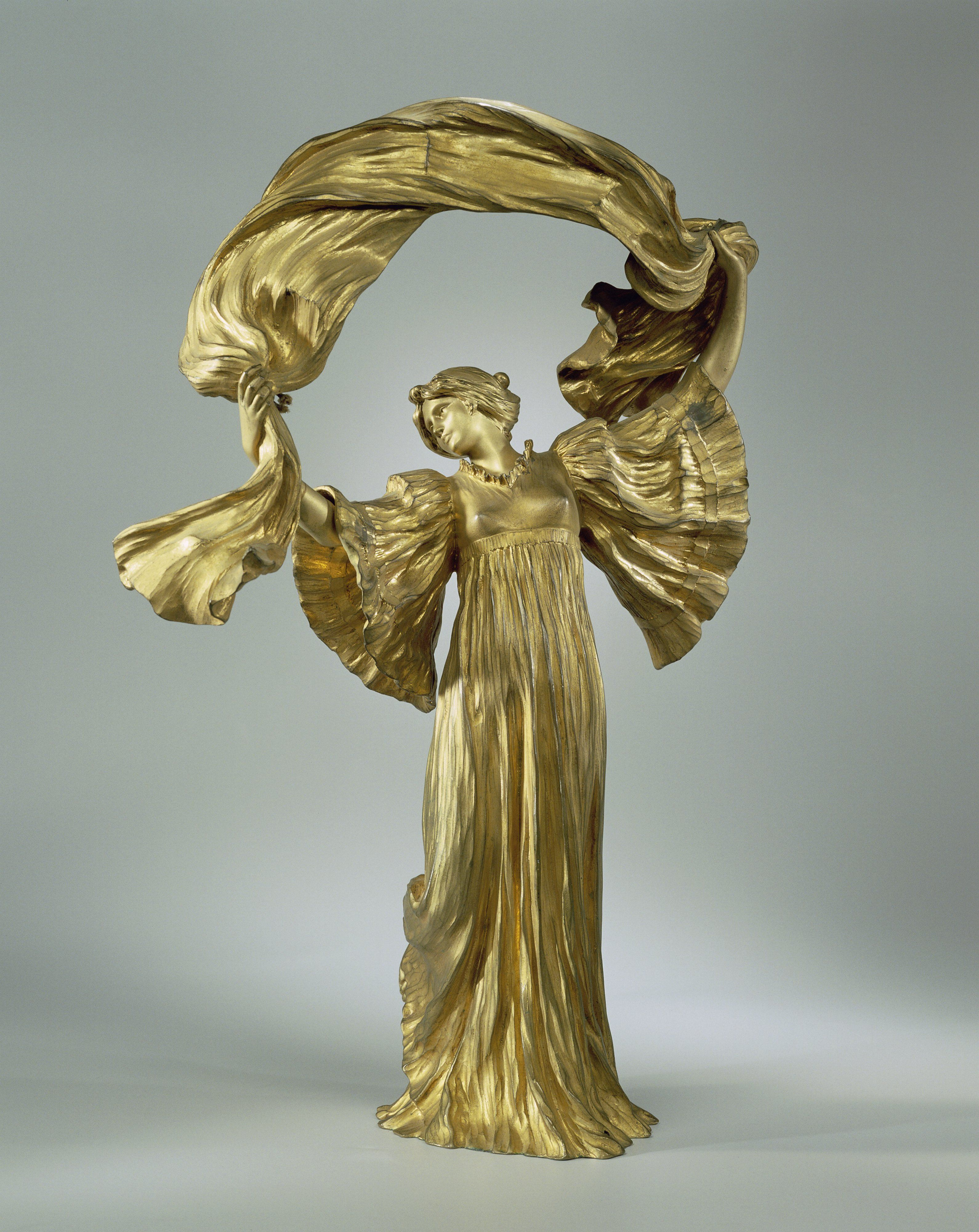
Art Nouveau dancer figure; circa 1900; ormolu; height: 40 cm; Rijksmuseum

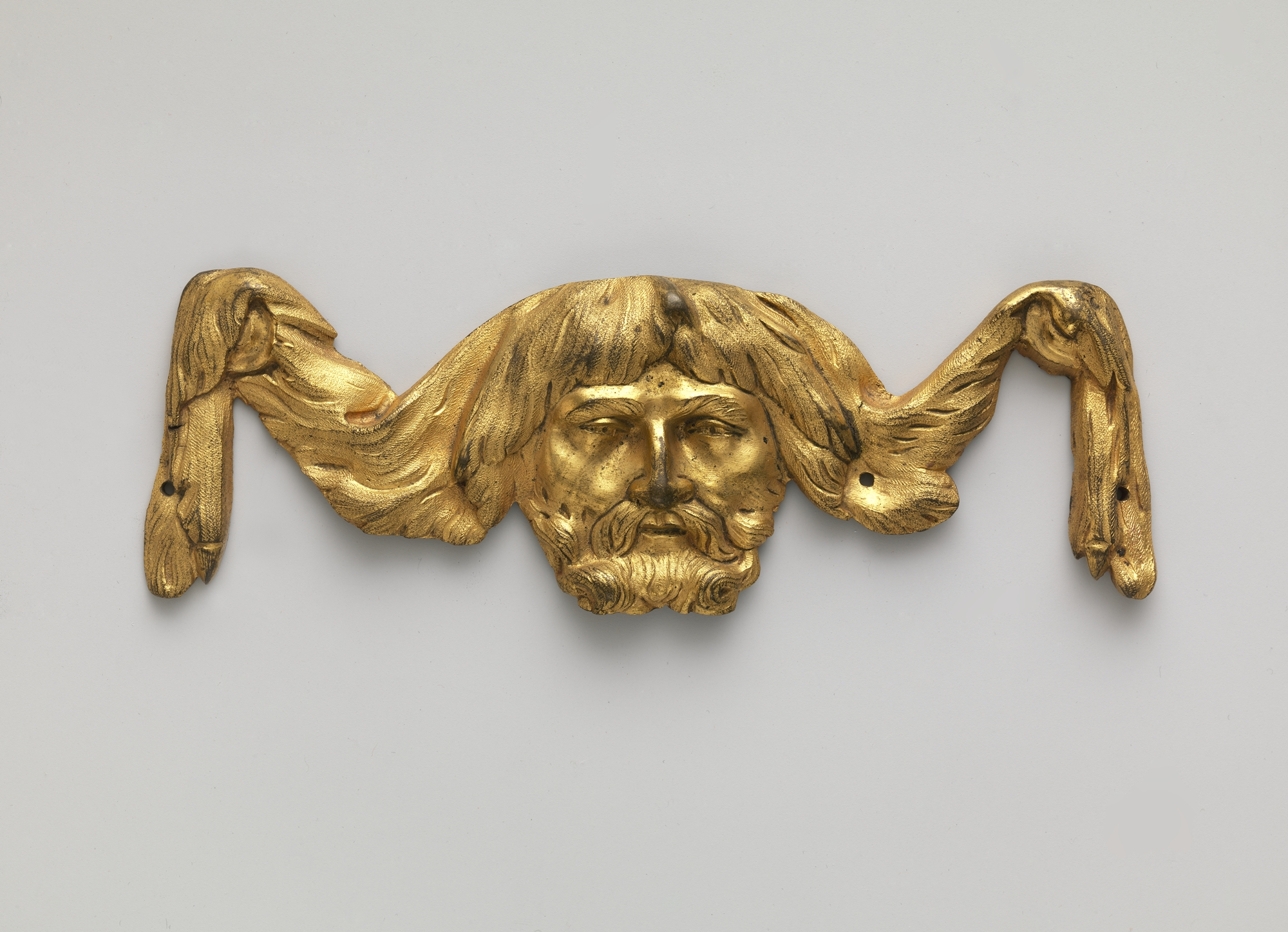
Festoon-like clock ornament; 18th century; gilt-bronze; overall: 5.4 × 15.6 × 1 cm; Metropolitan Museum of Art

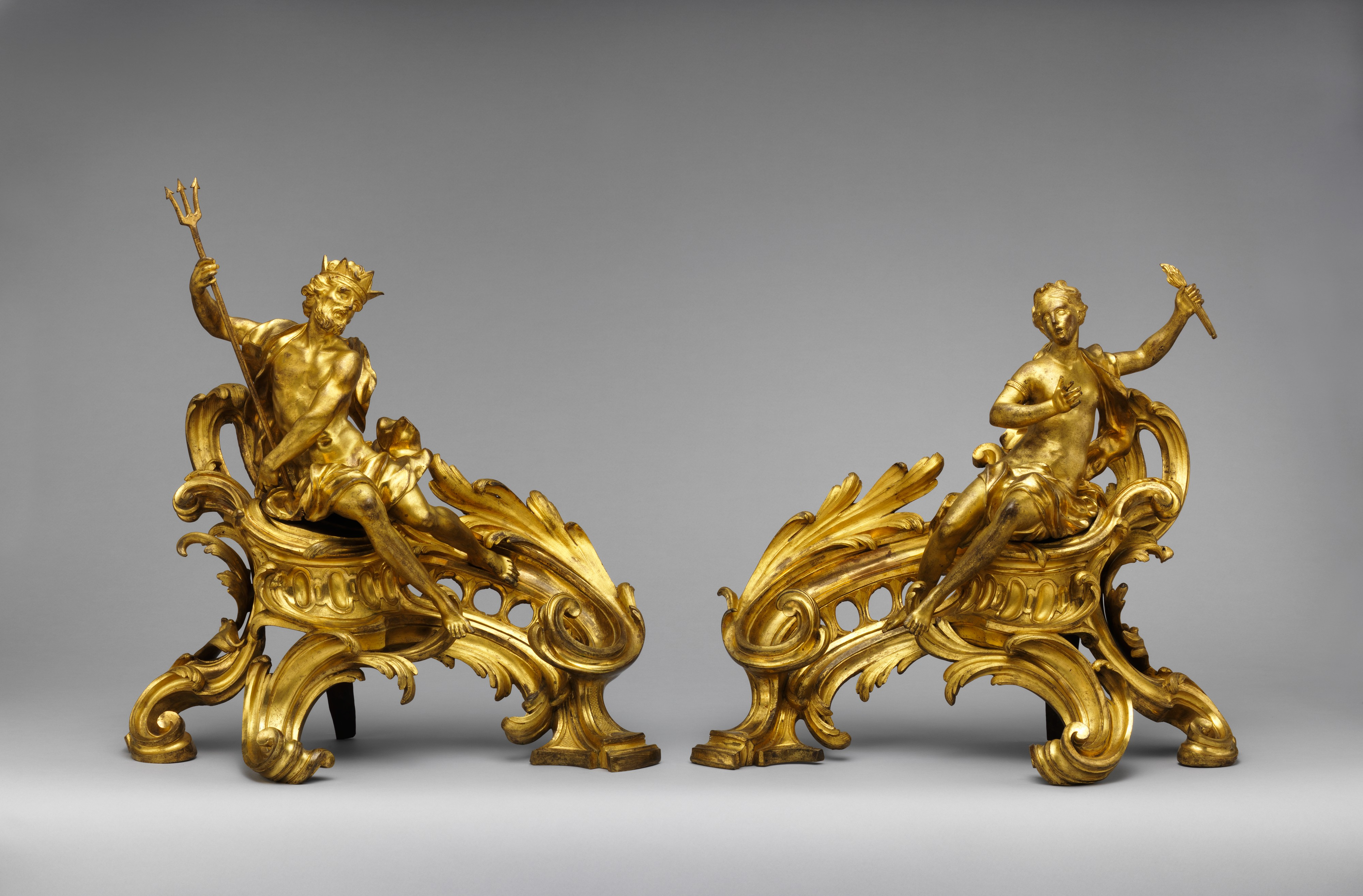
Pair of Rococo firedogs (chenets); circa 1750; gilt-bronze; dimensions of the first: 52.7 × 48.3 × 26.7 cm, of the second: 45.1 × 49.1 × 24.8 cm; Metropolitan Museum of Art

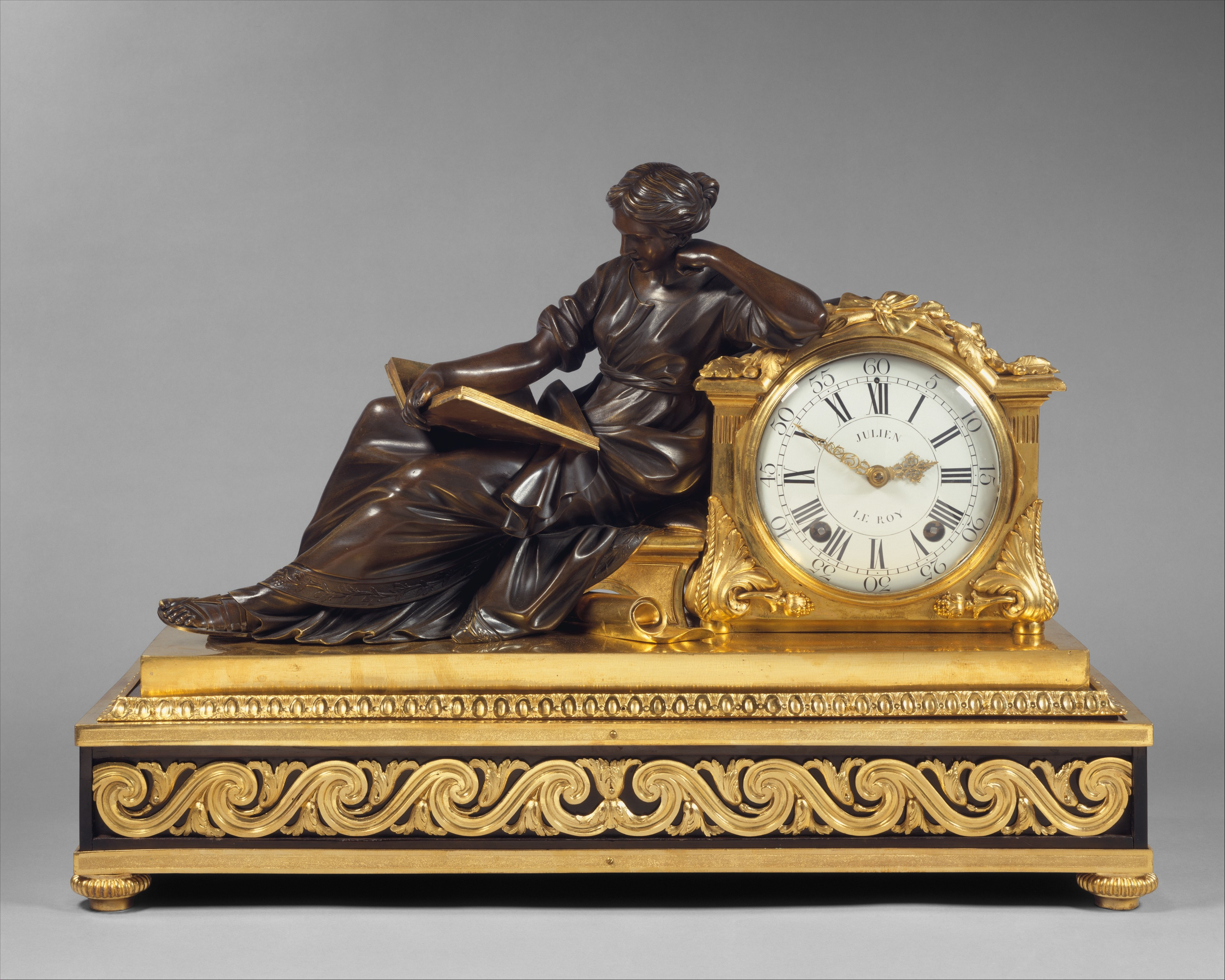
Neoclassical mantel clock (pendule de cheminée); 1757–1760; gilded (ormolu) and patinated bronze, oak veneered with ebony, white enamel with black numerals, and other materials; 48.3 × 69.9 × 27.9 cm; Metropolitan Museum of Art

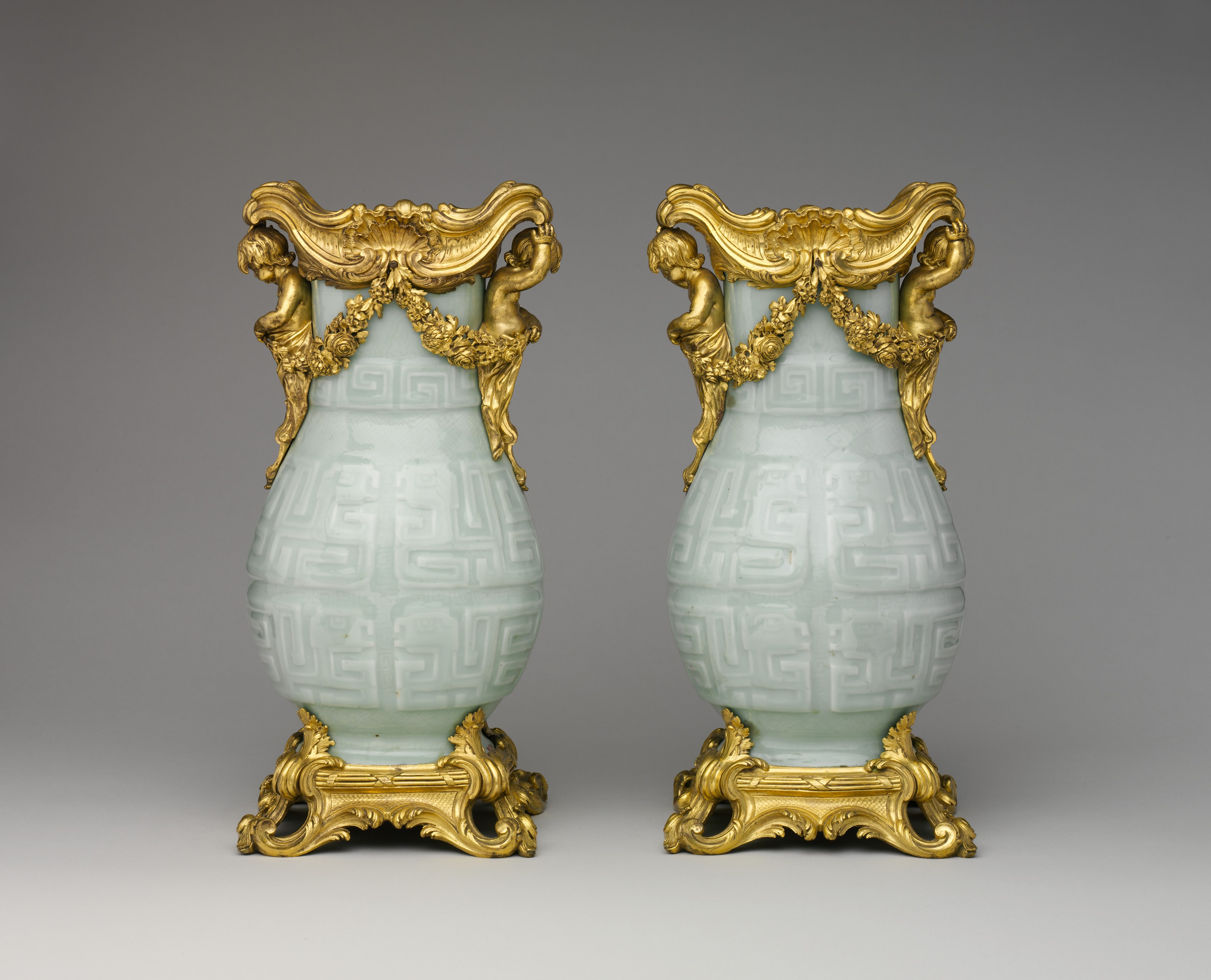
Pair of Chinese vases with French Rococo mounts; the vases: early 18th century, the mounts: 1760–70; hard-paste porcelain with gilt-bronze mounts; 32.4 × 16.5 × 12.4 cm; Metropolitan Museum of Art

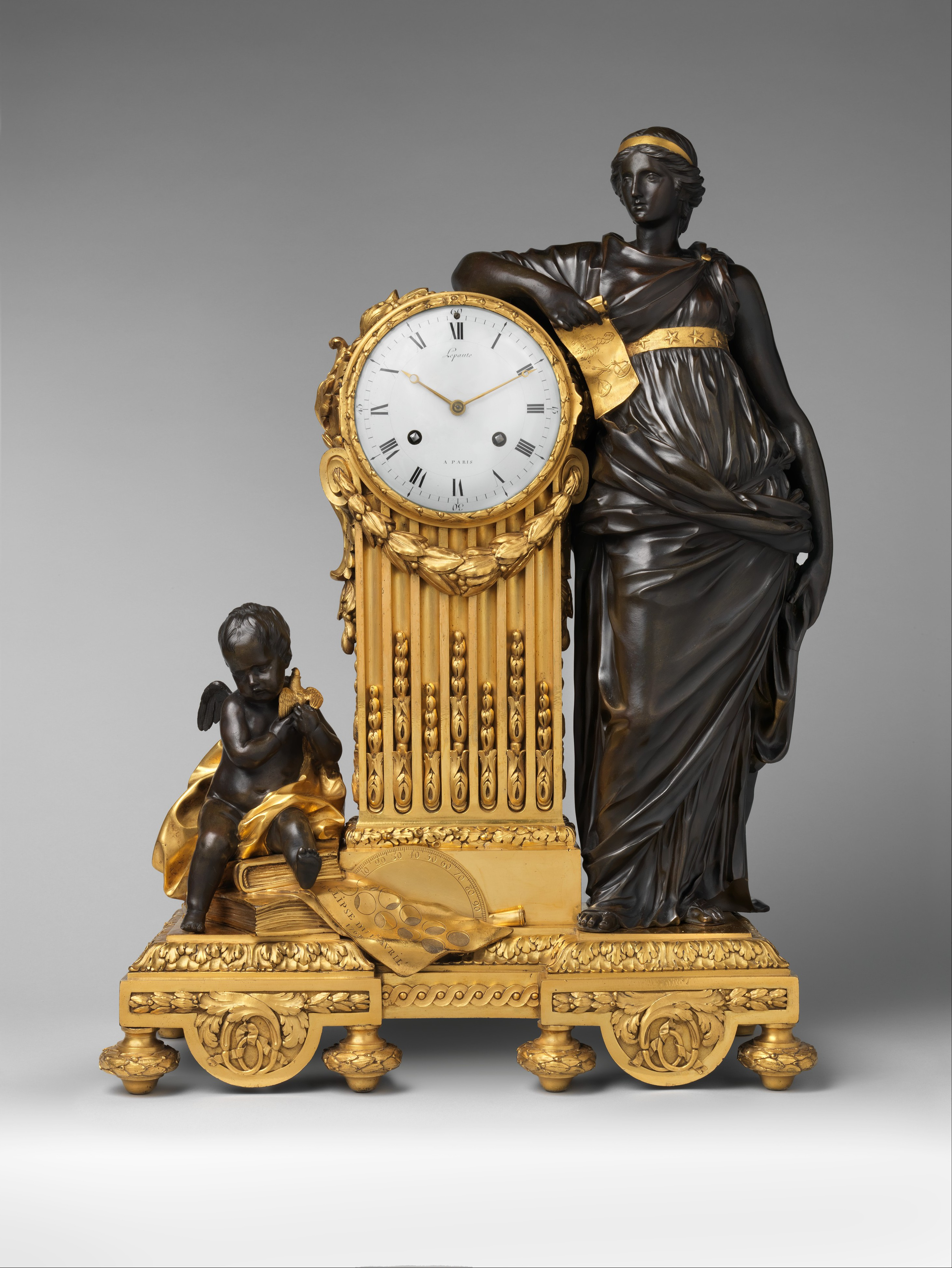
Neoclassical mantel clock ("Pendule Uranie"); 1764–1770; case: patinated bronze and ormolu, Dial: white enamel, movement: brass and steel; 71.1 × 52.1 × 26.7 cm; Metropolitan Museum of Art

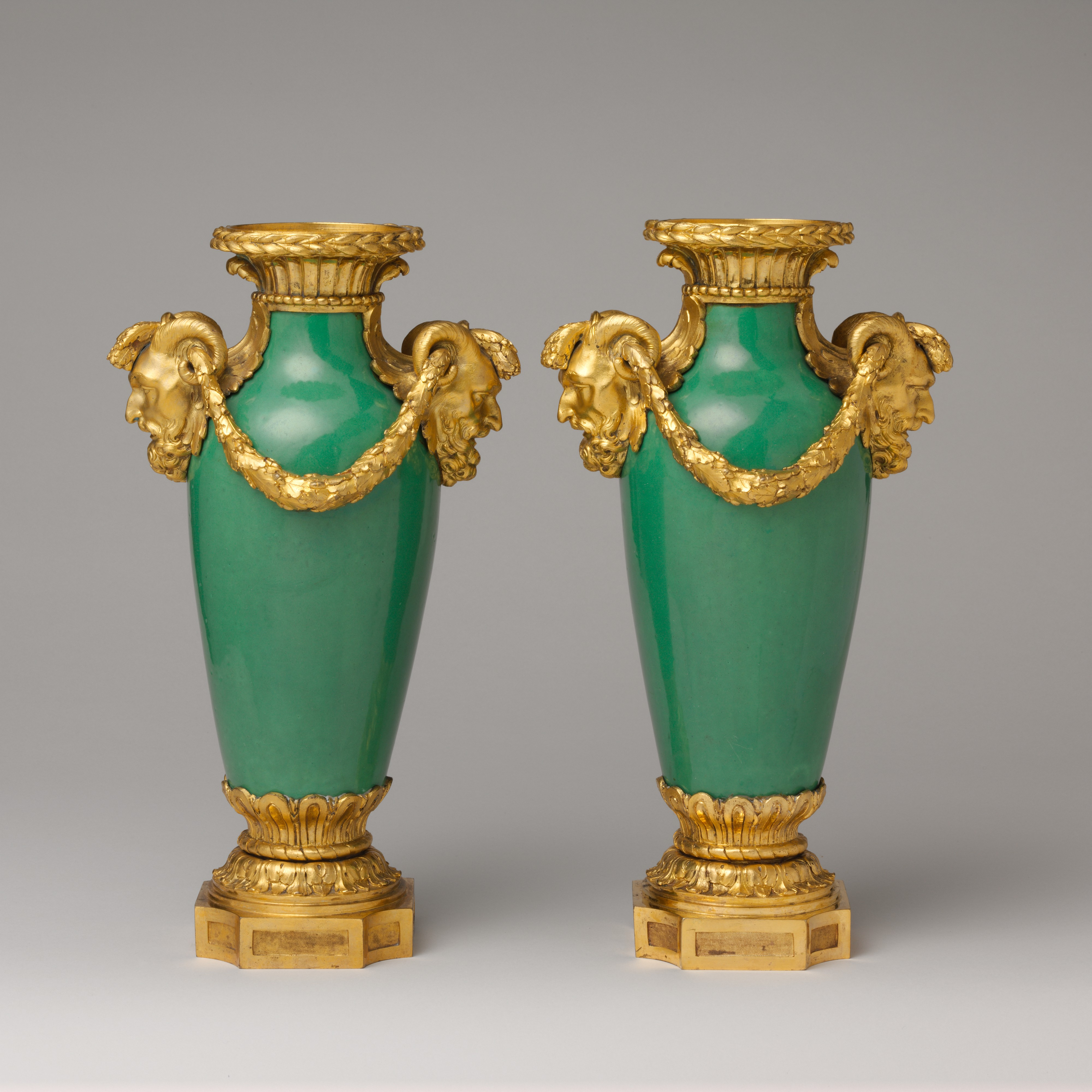
Pair of mounted vases (vase à monter); 1765–1770; soft-paste porcelain and gilt-bronze mounts; 28.9 × 17.1 cm; Metropolitan Museum of Art

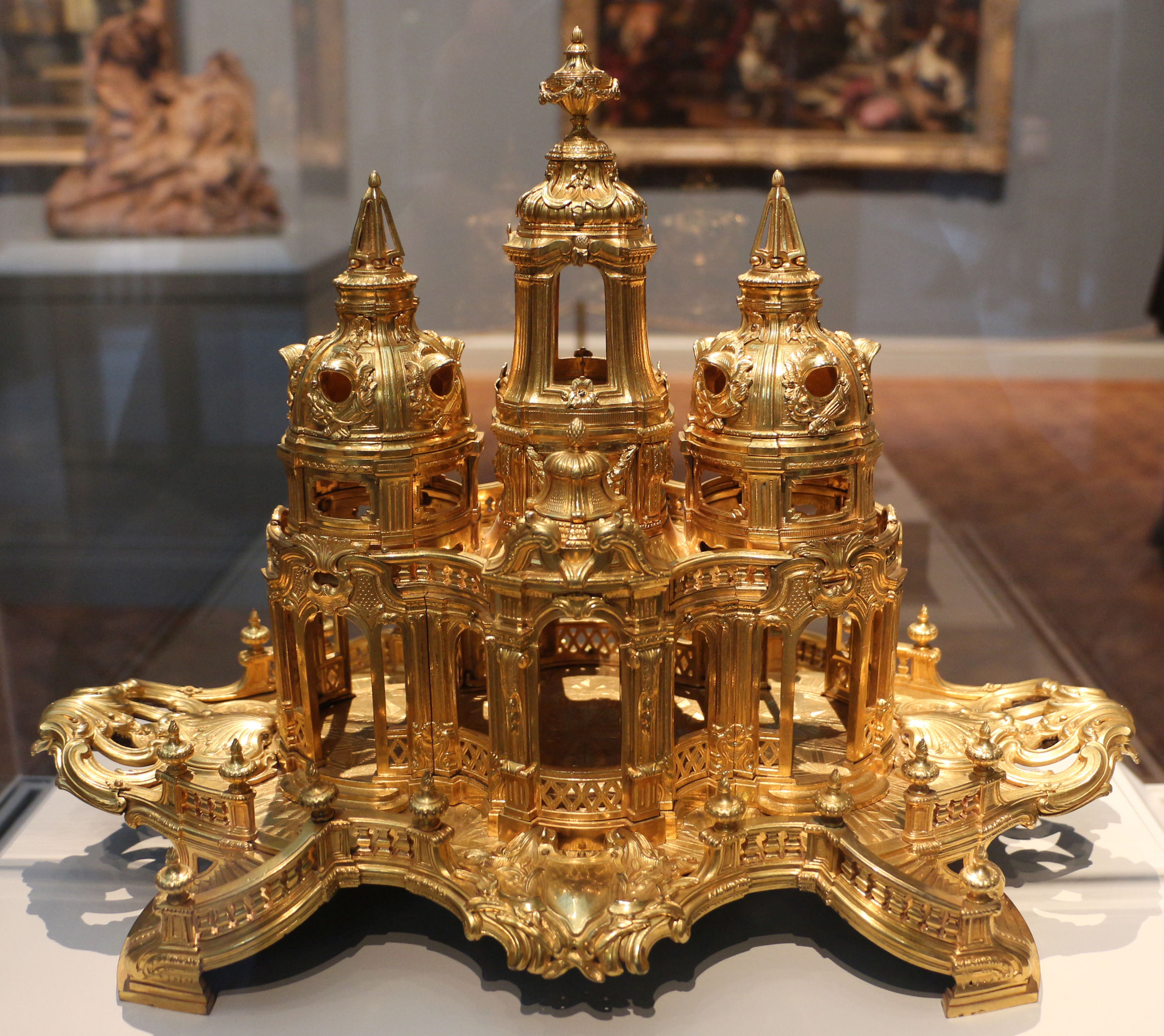
Architectural centrepiece; by Denis René Gastecloux; 1768; gilt-bronze; 30.5 x 43.5 x 24.5 cm; Art Institute of Chicago (Chicago, USA)

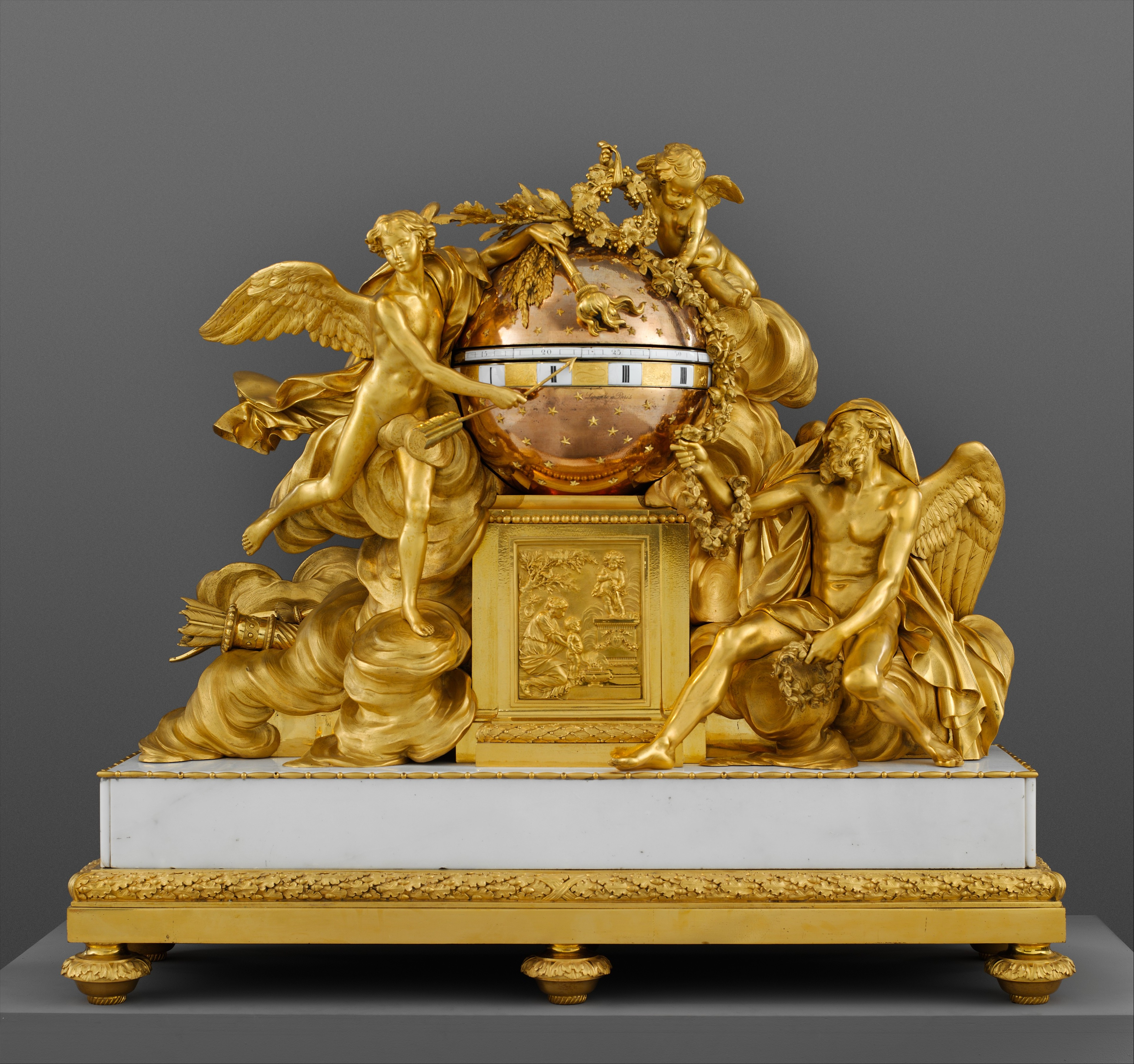
"Triumph of Love over Time" mantel clock; circa 1780–1790; gilt-bronze, marble and enamel; overall: 94 × 104.1 × 31.8 cm; Metropolitan Museum of Art

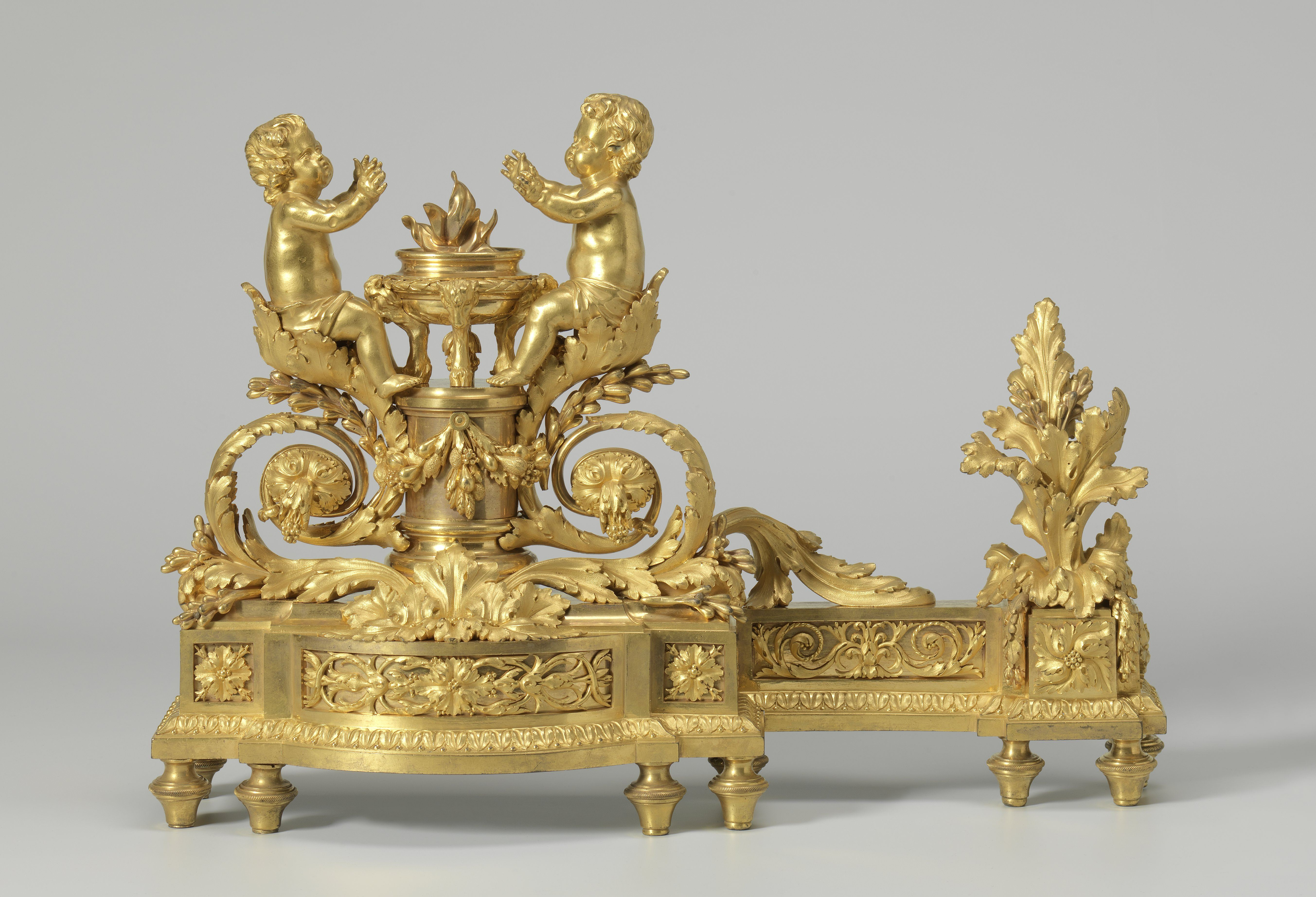
Firedog with putti that warm themselves at a flame; 1780–1790; gilt-bronze; height: 34.5 cm; Rijksmuseum

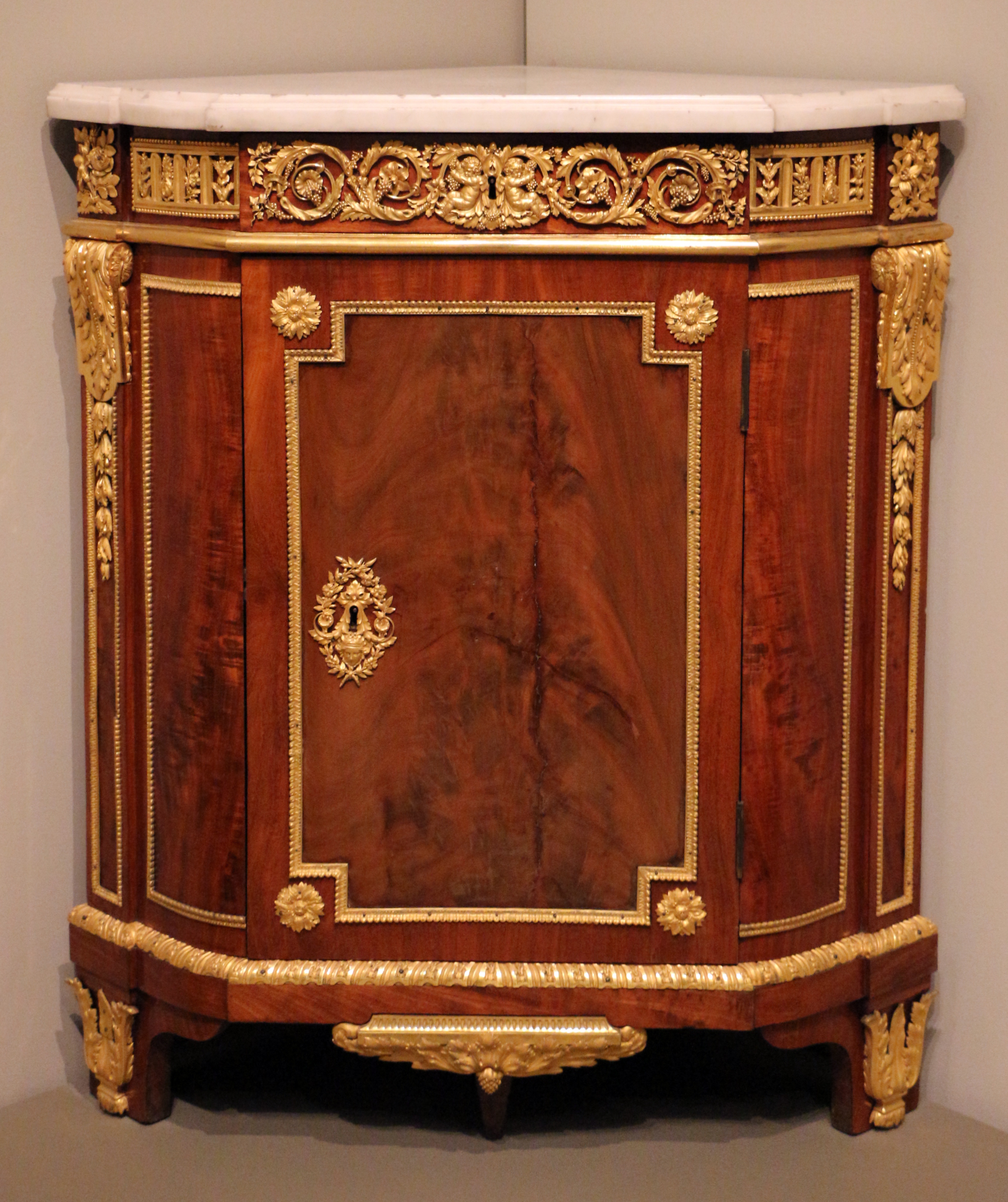
Louis XVI corner cabinet; by Jean Henri Riesener; 1780–1790; oak, mahogany, marble, and gilt-bronze mounts; 94.3 × 81.3 × 55.9 cm; Art Institute of Chicago (US)

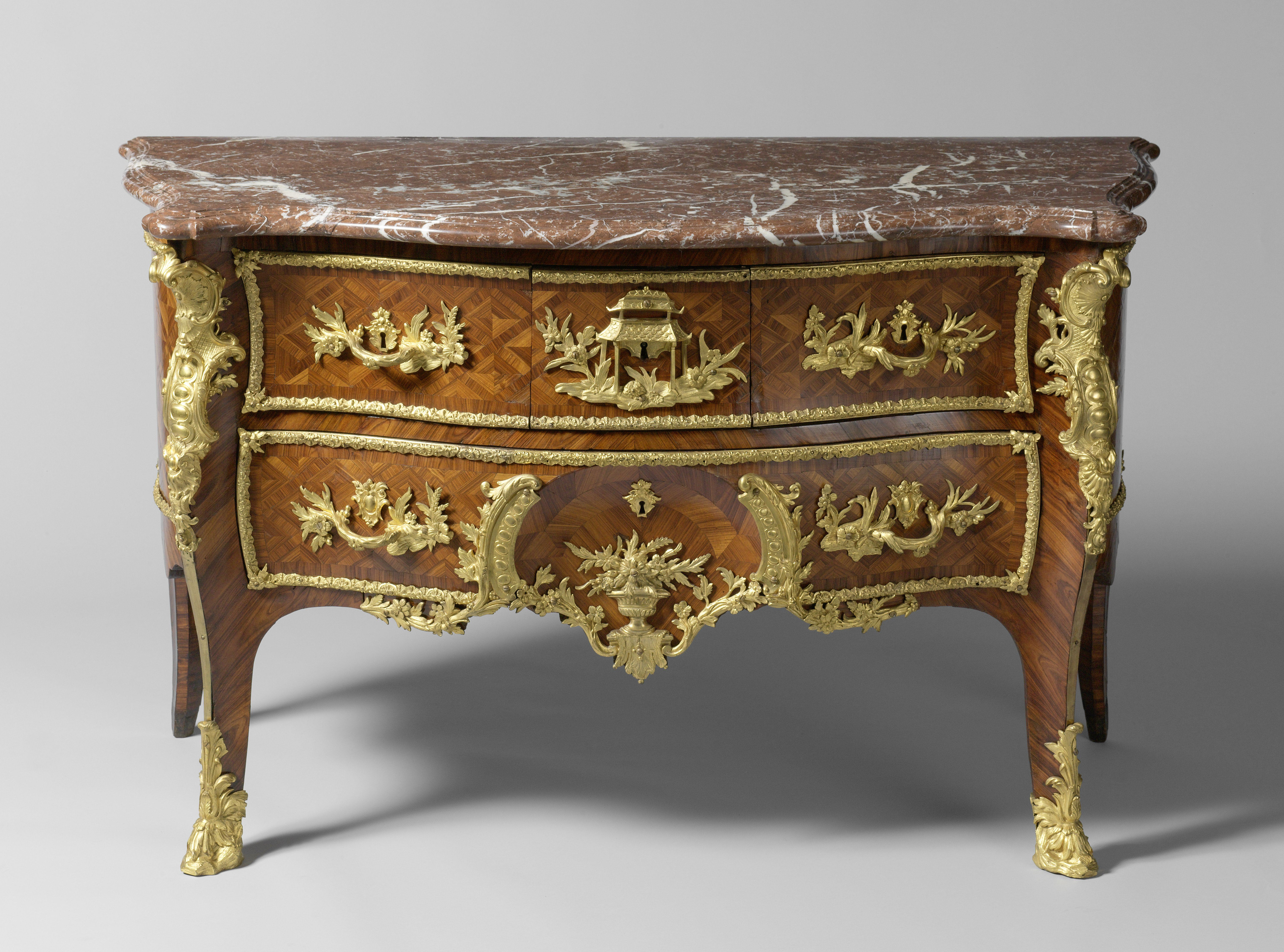
Rococo commode; 1730–1745; spruce, oak, violet, rosewood, coniferous, gilt-bronze ornaments, copper, and marble; height: 82 cm; Rijksmuseum (Amsterdam, the Netherlands)

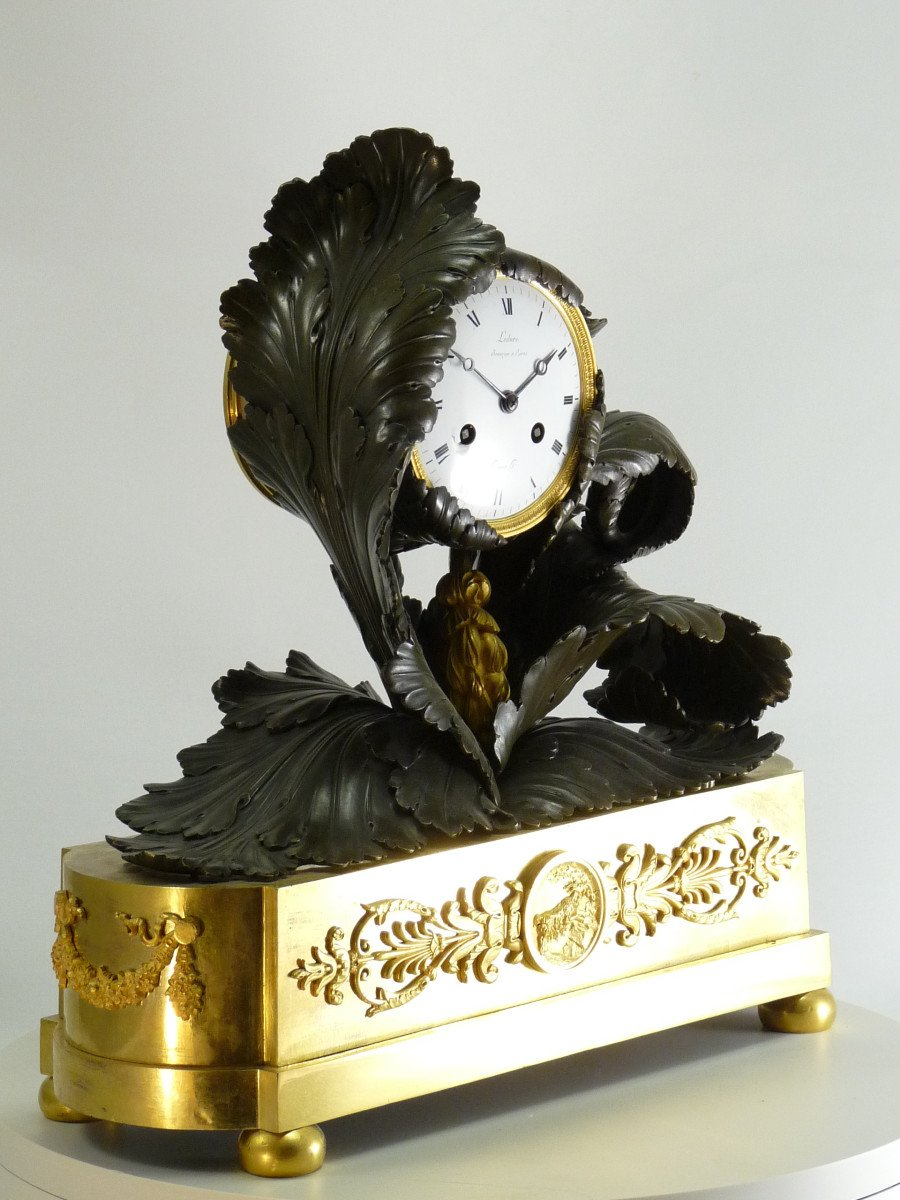
Neoclassical French ormolu and patinated bronze mantel clock, « Aux feuilles de chou » (with cabbage leaves). The clock case by Pierre-Victor Ledure, the clockwork by Claude Hémon (1770–1820)

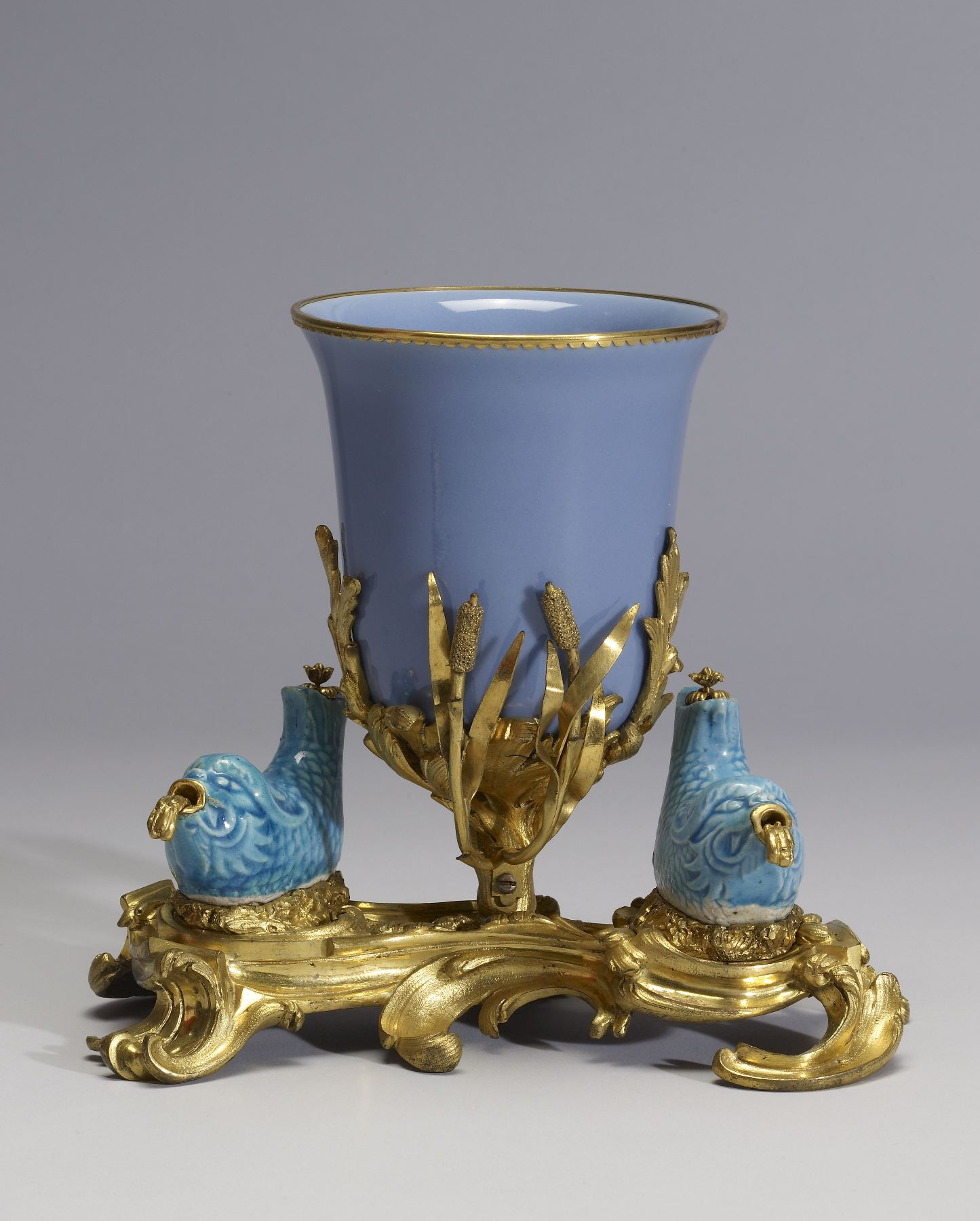
Bowl Mounted with Two Fish; bowl: 1730–1740, fishes: early 18th century, mounts: 1745–1749; porcelain with glaze monochrome turquoise/light blue and French ormolu mounts; 18.7 cm; Walters Art Museum (Baltimore, US)

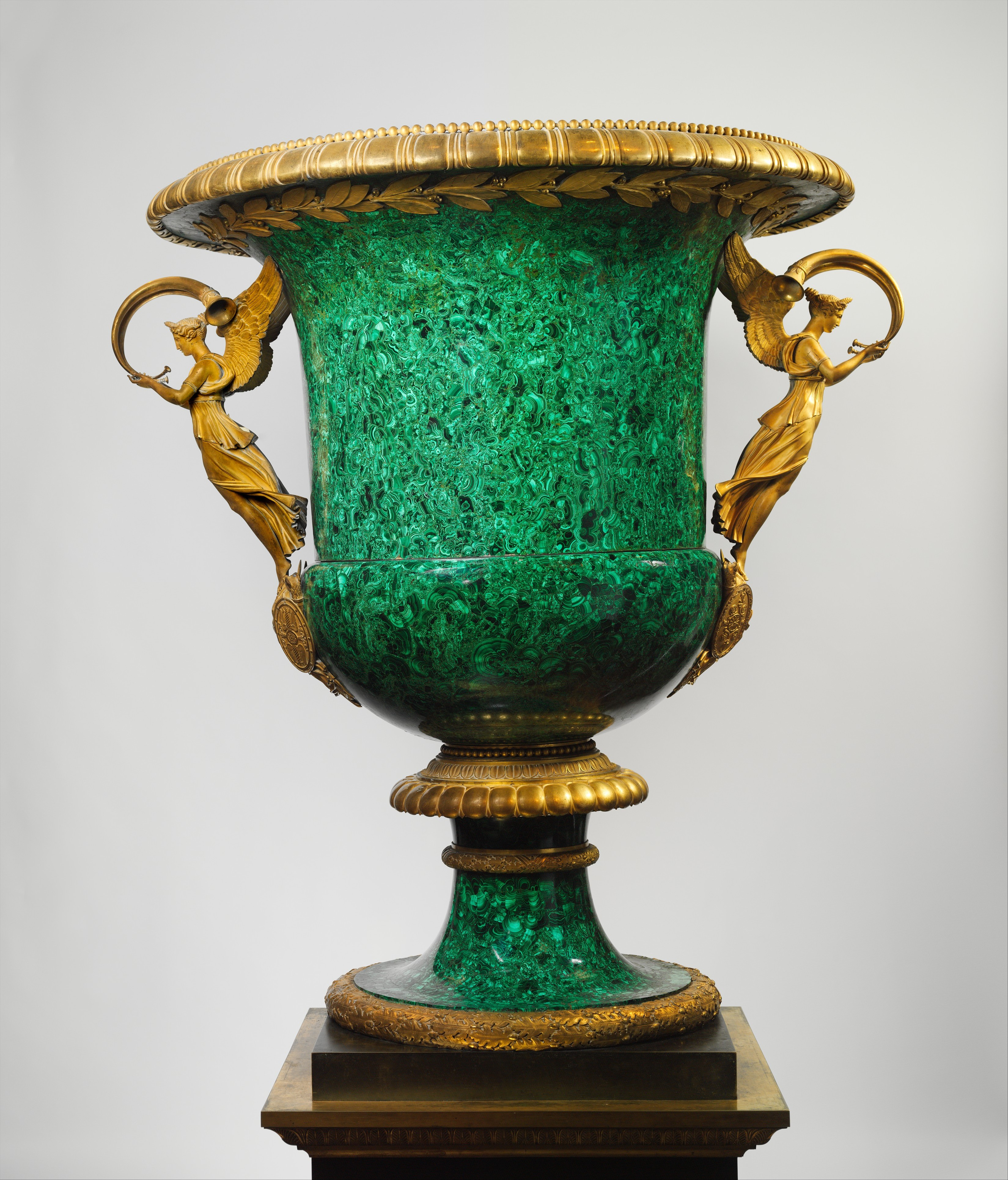
Monumental Neoclassical vase; by Pierre-Philippe Thomire; early 19th century; Russian malachite, composite filling material, gilt-bronze mounts and bronze pedestal; height with pedestal: 277.5 cm; Metropolitan Museum of Art

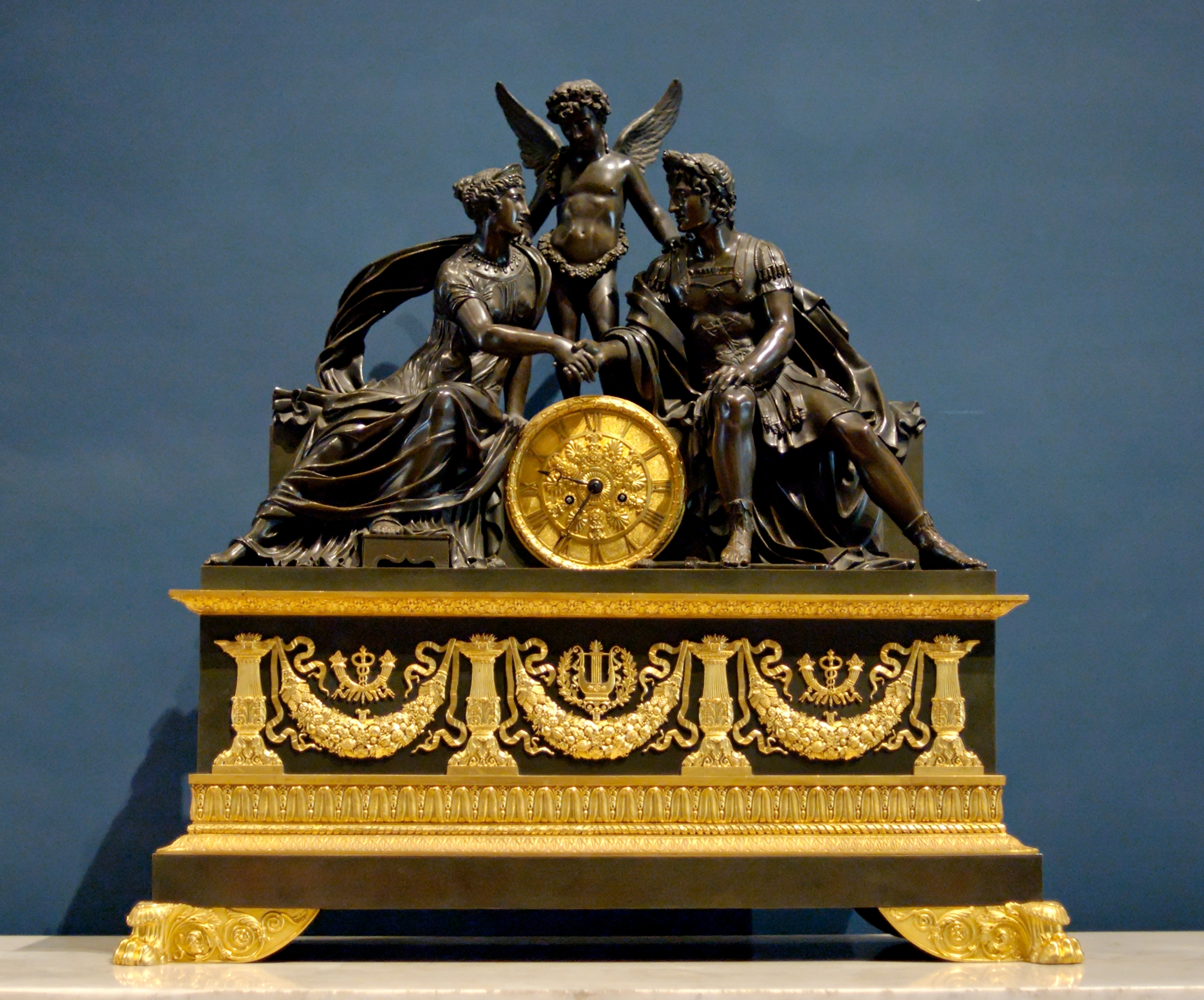
Patinated and ormolu Empire timepiece representing Mars and Venus, an allegory of the wedding of Napoleon I and Archduchess Marie Louise of Austria in 1810; by the famous bronzier Pierre-Philippe Thomire; circa 1810; gilded bronze and patina; height: 90 cm; Louvre

== See also ==
- Gold plating

== References and sources ==
Sources

- Swantje Koehler: Ormolu Dollhouse Accessories. Swantje-Köhler-Verlag, Bonn 2007. ISBN 3-9811524-0-9.
