= Pierre-Victor Ledure =

French bronzier

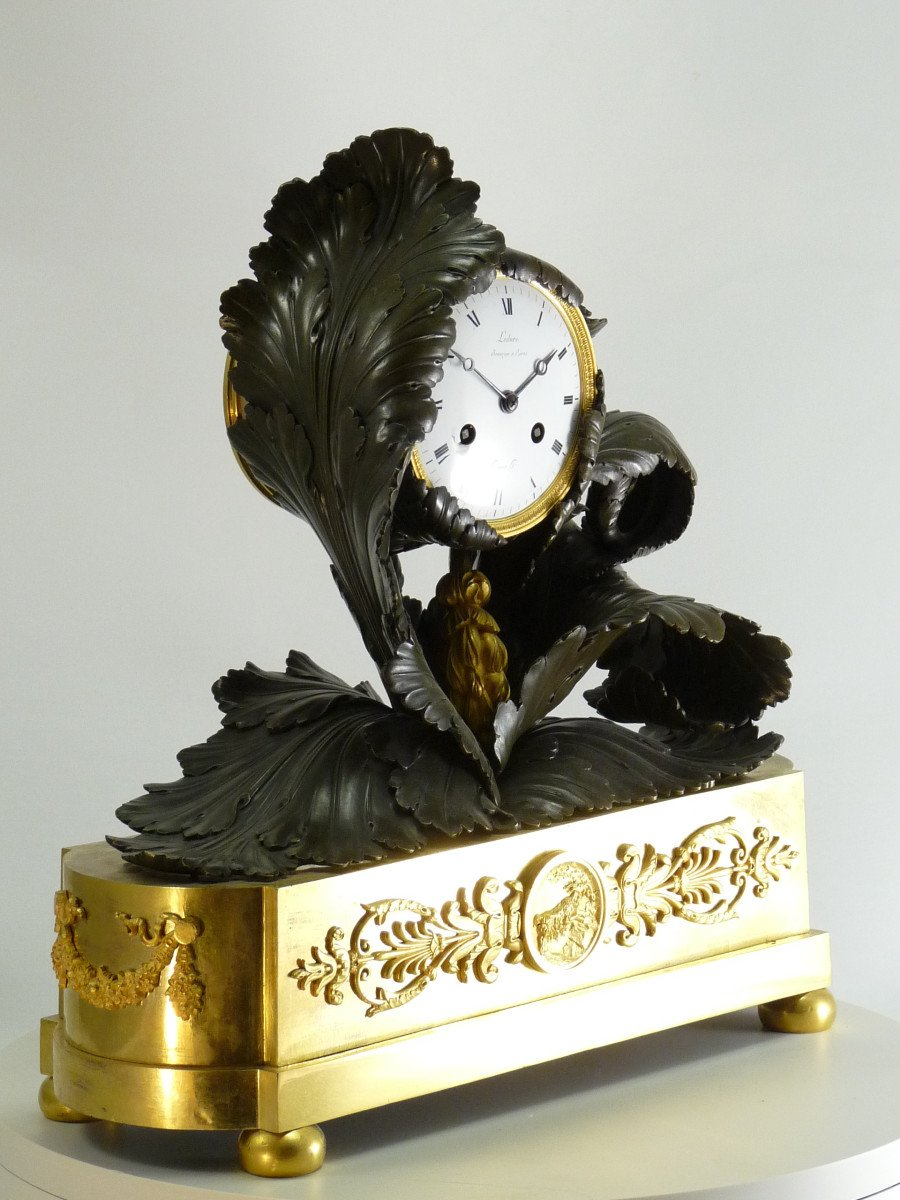
- One of Pierre-Victor Ledure's avant-garde designs in the Empire style: « Aux feuilles d'acanthus » (with acanthus leaves). The dial is signed by both: Pierre-Victor Ledure and Claude Hémon (1770–1820).
- Born: 1783; Paris
- Died: 1840? Paris
- Education: Bronzier
- Known for: Clock cases
- Movement: Neoclassicism, Empire
- Awards: Exposition des produits de l'industrie française: Silver medal (1819), gold medal (1834)

Pierre-Victor Ledure, (1783–1840?) was a French marchand-fabricant (merchant-manufacturer) of bronzes, specialising in ormolu clock cases. He often worked together with the clockmaker Claude Hémon (1770–1820), who supplied the clockworks (Claude Hémon became a Maître Horloger (Master Clockmacker) in 1770 and had a workshop in the Rue Saint Martin in Paris between 1812 and 1820). Ledure's workshop is listed in Paris between 1813 and 1840, first in the Rue Neuve-des-Petits-Champs, then in the Rue Vivienne and finally in the Rue d'Angoulême.

"The Empire clock, like the furniture, adopts a monumentality, a robustness, one can even say a severity, which radically distinguish it from the works of the 18th century. The shapes become simpler, stiffer and, often, heavier."

— Pierre Kjellberg (1922–2014)

== Biography ==
Pierre-Victor Ledure was born in Paris in 1783. He was the son of Laurent Ledure and Marie-Marguérite, née Lainé, who died in 1788, when Ledure was only five years old. Ledure became an apprentice of André-Antoine Ravrio (1759–1814), a renowned bronzier. Ledure formed a close friendship with Ravrio and his adopted son, Louis-Stanislas Lenoir-Ravrio (1783–1846), who both acted as best men at Ledure's wedding in 1811. Ledure's wife, Geneviève, née Dartois, was the daughter of the gilder Edme Dartois († 1796). Geneviève's brother, Jean-Edme Dartois, was a bronzier too, with whom Pierre-Victor Ledure shared a workshop for a certain time.

== Supplier to an international clientele ==
Pierre-Victor Ledure was never employed by the Garde-Meuble. However, his reputation was such, that Ledure received many important commissions during the Empire period, enjoying the patronage form a wealthy international clientele, such as Ferdinand III, Grand Duke of Tuscany, who ordered a considerable number of bronze furnishings for his Würzburg Residence. The order included several fine figural clock cases. In 1820, Ledure supplied a clock case, resembling a Greek temple, to Arthur Wellesley, 1st Duke of Wellington, for his home, Stratfield Saye House. Furthermore, in 1835, Ledure also supplied many of his works to the government of King Louis Philippe I. Most notable, he supplied several candelabras for the Throne Room of the Tuileries Palace. The previous year, Ledure's firm, which he had renamed that year in Ledure & Cie., got the order to re-gild two bookstands in the Louis XIV Room at the Château de Versailles.

== Awards ==
Pierre-Victor Ledure was awarded a silver medal at the Exposition des produits de l'industrie française in 1819. And again at the Exposition des produits de l'industrie française in 1834, Ledure's company was awarded a gold medal for its collection of Renaissance style clock cases and other works of art.

== Death and legacy ==
Although Pierre-Victor Ledure's date of death is unknown, he is mentioned in the trade papers from 1813 up until 1840.

Pierre-Victor Ledure repeatedly produced clock cases with themes from the Greek mythology. However, he also created clock cases that, according to the understanding of the time, could almost be described as avant-garde. Examples of his work can be found in many private and public collections such as: The Musée du Louvre, the Château de Chantilly, the Rijksmuseum, the Royal Pavilion, the Royal Palace of Madrid, the Palacio de Viana and the residence of the Ambassador of the United Kingdom to France, the Hôtel de Charost.
