= Horses Leaving the Sea =

1860 painting by Eugène Delacroix

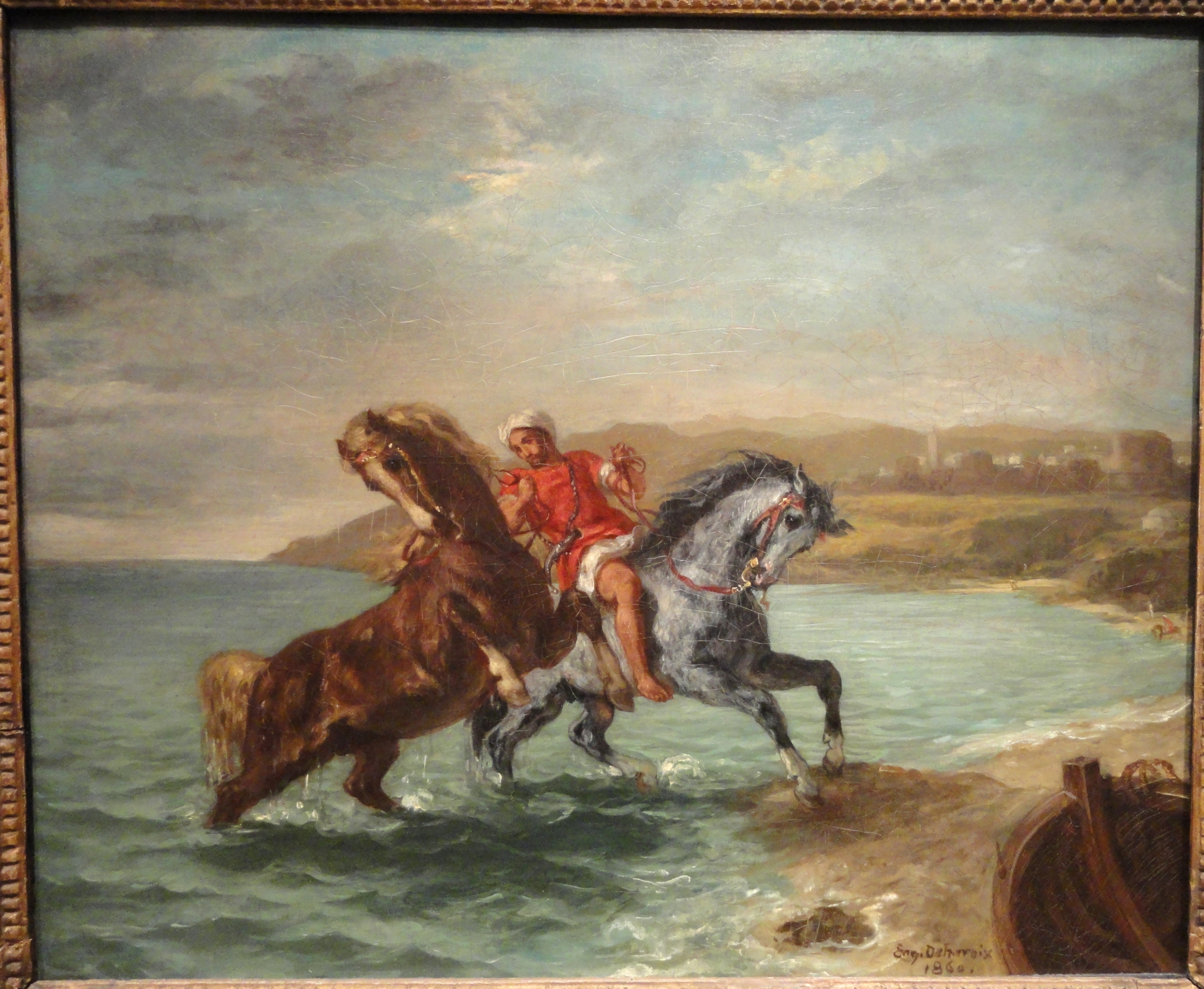
Horses Leaving the Sea (1860) by Eugène Delacroix

Horses Leaving the Sea or Horses Coming Out of the Sea is an 1860 oil on canvas painting by the French artist Eugène Delacroix, now in The Phillips Collection in Washington, D.C. Relatively atypical in Delacroix's oeuvre, it shows two horses leaving the sea led by a Moroccan rider, with the town of Tangiers in the background. It was produced for the same art dealer as Arab Horses Fighting in a Stable and is usually regarded as a pair with that work.

== Implementation ==
Eugène Delacroix testified at length to his fascination for the equestrian spectacle in his correspondence, and reserved a large part of his work to Arab horses and riders. Horses Leaving the Sea is a late painting, made a few years before his death, at the same time as Arab Horses Fighting in a Stable. Compared to that of the fighting horses, this painting can be considered as a "peaceful counterpoint". Both works are made for the same dealer, Estienne. This painting's spacious setting and lack of turbulent action is unusual in Delacroix's work. This is one of the very last Moroccan reminiscences among the works of Delacroix.
