= Arab Horses Fighting in a Stable =

1860 painting by Eugène Delacroix

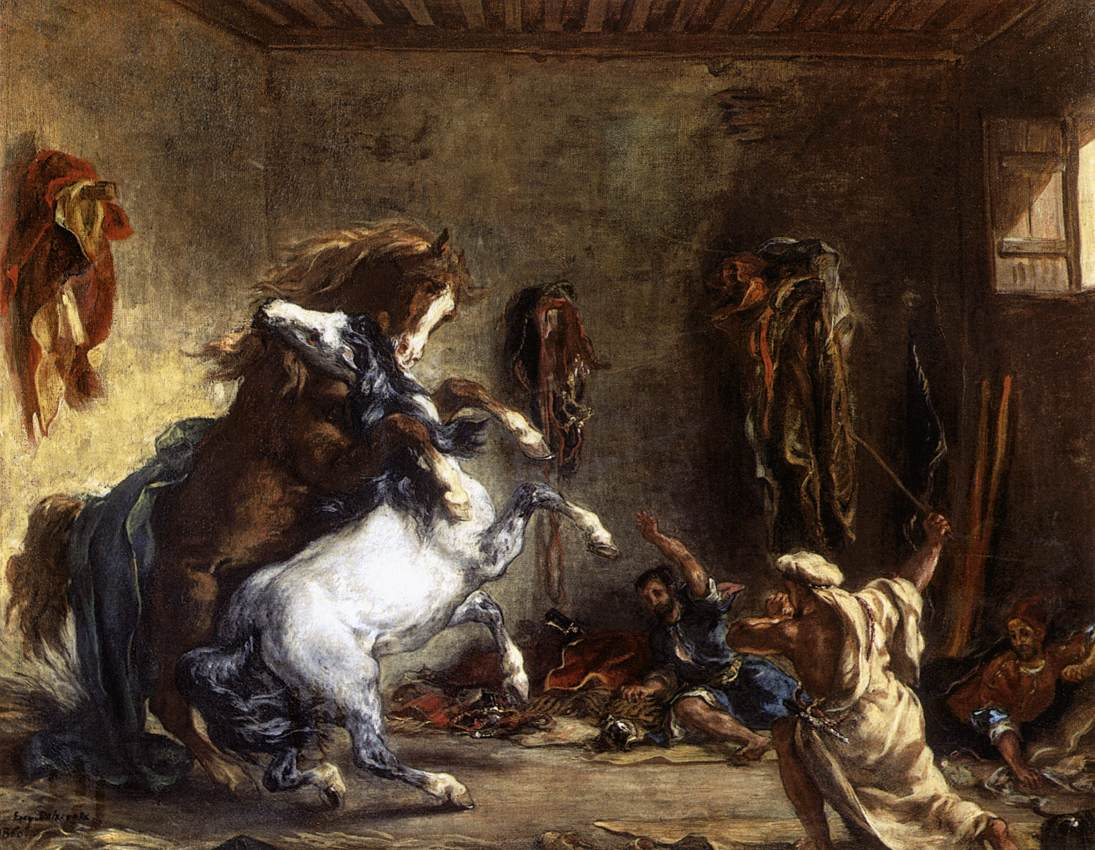
Arab Horses Fighting in a Stable (1860) by Eugène Delacroix

Arab Horses Fighting in a Stable is an 1860 Orientalist painting by the French Romantic artist Eugène Delacroix, now in the musée d'Orsay.

== History ==
The artist assisted in a stallion-fight during his time in Morocco, which left a deep impression and was mentioned in a letter to his friends on 8 February 1832. He produced a sketch of it and noted that "the grey horse passed his head under the neck of the other [horse]". In his diary entry for 19 June 1854 Delacroix mentioned this subject as one of several Morocco-themed works he was then working on, but even so he only seems to have begun Arab Horses around two years later in 1856. He completed it on 14 June 1860, putting thirty years between the stallion-fight and the work's completion. The painting is signed and dated by the artist at the lower left. Delacroix has set action in a stable, although the event that inspired the painting had taken place outdoors.

He produced the work for Estienne, the same art dealer as Horses Leaving the Sea, and so the two works are usually considered as a pair.

The work was sold in Paris on 12 February 1872 and the following year John Saulnier acquired it in Bordeaux. It was next recorded as being owned by Charles Hayem in 1885, then by Isaac de Camondo. It was donated to the Louvre in 1908, exhibiting it two years later It was moved to its present home in 1986.
