= François de Crussol, 4th Duke of Uzès =

French soldier and courtier

François de Crussol
- 4th Duke of Uzès, Peer of France; Prince of Soyons; Count of Crussol
- Born: François de Crussol; 24 April 1604; Château d'Uzès, Languedoc, France
- Died: 14 July 1680 (aged 76); Château d'Acier, France
- Noble family: Crussol
- Spouses: Henriette de La Châtre (m. 1625; div. 1633) Marguerite d'Apchier (m. 1636; died 1680)
- Issue: Emmanuel II de Crussol; Louis de Crussol-Florensac; Marie-Rose de Crussol; Suzanne de Crussol d'Uzès
- Father: Emmanuel de Crussol d'Uzès
- Mother: Claudine d'Hébrard de Saint Sulpice

François de Crussol, 4th Duke of Uzès (24 April 1604 – 14 July 1680), was a French soldier and courtier.

== Early life ==
Crussol was born at the Château d'Uzès in Uzès in the Gard department in Southern France on 24 April 1604. He was the eldest son of Emmanuel de Crussol, 3rd Duke of Uzès, and Claudine d'Hébrard de Saint Sulpice. From his parents' marriage, he was brother to Jacques Christophe de Crussol (who founded the Marquis of Saint-Sulpice branch), Louis de Crussol (Abbot of Figeac and Conques, styled Marquis of Crussol), Alexandre Galliot de Crussol (who founded the Marquis of Montsalès branch), Anne Gaston de Crussol (Baron of Florensac who was killed at the Siege of Turin in 1640), and Louise de Crussol (who married Antoine Hercule de Budos, Marquis des Portes, and, after his death, Charles de Rouvroy, Marquis of Saint-Simon de Rasse, brother to Claude de Rouvroy, 1st Duke of Saint-Simon). After his mother died in c. 1632, his father married Marguerite d'Apchier (née de Flagheac), who was the mother of his second wife (from her first marriage). From his father's second marriage, he had a younger half-brother, Armand de Crussol, Count of Uzès, Marquis of Cuisieux, who was murdered in Osnabrück in 1663.

His paternal grandparents were Jacques II de Crussol, 2nd Duke of Uzès (who had inherited the barony of Acier from his mother, Jeanne Ricard de Genouillac, before inheriting the dukedom from his brother, Antoine de Crussol, 1st Duke of Uzès), and Françoise de Clermont-Tonnerre. His maternal grandparents were Bertrand III d'Hébrard de Saint Sulpice, and Marguerite de Balaguier de Montsalès.

== Career ==
As soon as he was old enough to bear arms, he was put in charge of a Cavalry Regiment which bore his name of Crussol. After his father resigned from his position of Knight of Honour of the Queen Mother (French: chevalier d'honneur de la reine mère) in favour of François on 1 June 1656, he retired to Florensac, where he died on 19 July 1657, with François then becoming the 4th Duke of Uzès.

François, who fought in the Siege of Perpignan in 1642, was instrumental in annexing the area of Roussillon into France through the Treaty of the Pyrenees in 1659 (resolving the uprising of the Catalans against the Spanish Crown, known as the Reapers' War). King Louis XIII entered the conflict on the side of the Spanish Crown and, at the end, the Treaty partitioned the Principality of Catalonia, securing Roussillon and part of the Cerdanya to the French crown, creating the French province of Roussillon. Both the Duke and his second wife were present at the wedding of Louis XIV to Marie Thérèse of Spain in 1660. The couple enjoyed the favour of the King at the court of Louis XIV.

== Personal life ==
Crussol was twice married. His first marriage was on 7 January 1625 to Louise Henriette de La Châtre, Baroness de Maisonfort (b. c. 1600), daughter of Louis de La Châtre, Baron de Maisonfort (son of Claude de La Châtre) and Elisabeth Louise d'Étampes de Valençay. She had previously been married to François de Valois d'Angoulême, Count d'Alais (son of Charles de Valois, Duke of Angoulême, himself an illegitimate son of King Charles IX, and a grandson of Henri de Montmorency, 3rd Duke of Montmorency), from April 1622 until his death in September 1622. They divorced and she remarried to Claude Pot de Rhodes, the Grand Master of Ceremonies of France, in 1633, shortly before her death on 4 June 1634.

=== Second marriage ===
On 28 September 1636, he remarried to Marguerite d'Apchier, Countess of Vazeilles (1617–1708) at the Château d'Uzès. She was a daughter of Christophe, Count d'Apchier, and Marguerite de Flagheac. Together, they were the parents of seven children, including:

- Emmanuel II de Crussol (1642–1692), who married Julie-Marie de Sainte-Maure, the only daughter and heiress of Charles de Sainte-Maure, Duke of Montausier, Governor of the Dauphin, and Julie d'Angennes, Marquise of Rambouillet, in 1664.
- Louis de Crussol (c. 1645–1716), who founded the Marquis of Florensac cadet branch; he married Marie-Louise-Thérèse de St-Nectaire-Lestrange-Cheylane in 1688.
- Galliot de Crussol, Abbot of Uzès.
- Marguerite de Crussol, a Carmelite nun.
- Anne-Louise de Crussol, also a nun.
- Marie-Rose de Crussol, who married François Joseph de Porcelet, Count of Laudun, in 1668. After his death, she married Gabriel Charles de Murviel, Marquis de Murviel, in 1675.
- Suzanne de Crussol (c. 1650–1723), a Benedictine nun who was Abbess of Yerres from 1691 to 1709.

The Duke died on 14 July 1680 at the Château d'Acier. He was succeeded by his eldest son, Emmanuel II.

French nobility
| Preceded by Emmanuel de Crussol d'Uzès | Duke of Uzès; 1657–1680 | Succeeded by Emmanuel II de Crussol d'Uzès |
