= Emmanuel de Crussol, 9th Duke of Uzès =

French aristocrat, politician and soldier

François-Emmanuel de Crussol
- 9th Duke of Uzès
- Born: François-Emmanuel de Crussol; 1 January 1728; Paris, France
- Died: 22 March 1802 (aged 74); Paris, France
- Noble family: Crussol
- Spouse: Julie-Magdeleine de Pardaillan (m. 1753; died 1799)
- Issue: Marie-François-Emmanuel de Crussol; Marie Charlotte de Crussol
- Father: Charles Emmanuel de Crussol d'Uzès
- Mother: Émilie de La Rochefoucauld

François-Emmanuel de Crussol, 9th Duke of Uzès (1 January 1728 – 22 March 1802), was a French aristocrat, politician and soldier.

== Early life ==
Crussol was born in Paris on 11 January 1728. He was the eldest son of Charles Emmanuel de Crussol, 8th Duke of Uzès and Émilie de La Rochefoucauld (1700–1753). His younger brother, Charles-Emmanuel de Crussol, died young, and his younger sister, Charlotte-Émilie de Crussol, married, as his second wife, Louis-Marie de Rohan-Chabot, 5th Duke of Rohan.

His paternal grandparents were Jean Charles de Crussol, 7th Duke of Uzès, and, his second wife, Anne Marie Marguerite de Bullion de Fervacques (a daughter of Charles-Denis de Bullion, Marquis de Bonnelles). His grandfather's first wife was Princess Anna Hippolyte Grimaldi of Monaco (daughter of the reigning Prince of Monaco, Louis I, and the former Catherine de Gramont). His aunt, Jeanne-Julie-Françoise de Crussol, was married to Louis César de La Baume Le Blanc, 3rd Duke of La Vallière. His maternal grandparents were François de La Rochefoucauld, 4th Duke of La Rochefoucauld, and Charlotte Le Tellier (daughter of Louis XIV's Minister, François-Michel Le Tellier, Marquis de Louvois).

== Career ==
Crussol took part in the Seven Years' War and was made maréchal de camp in 1761 and Lieutenant-General in 1780. He served as governor of Saintonge and Angoumois. Upon the death of his father in 1762, he became the 9th Duke of Uzès, the premier non-Royal Duke of France. He also inherited the Hôtel d'Uzès in Paris which, in 1767, he commissioned neo-classical architect Claude-Nicolas Ledoux to update.

In 1771, he inherited the Château de Bonnelles from his maternal uncle, Auguste-Léon de Bullion, Marquis de Bonnelles. In 1782, he had the château doubled in size and added a number of garden buildings. A supporter of the Royal family, he attended the funeral of King Louis XV in 1774 and was made Chevalier des Ordres du Roi by King Louis XVI in 1776. During the French Revolution, his château was confiscated as an émigré's property (he emigrated to England) and was demolished at the end of the 18th century during the upheaval caused by the Revolution and the succeeding Napoleonic rule. The estate was abandoned for some time. The Duke returned to France in 1801.

== Personal life ==
On 8 January 1753, Crussol was married to Julie-Magdeleine-Victoire de Pardaillan de Gondrin (1731–1799), youngest daughter of Louis de Pardaillan de Gondrin, 2nd Duke of Antin, and Françoise-Gillonne de Montmorency (a granddaughter of François-Henri de Montmorency, Duke of Luxembourg). Together, they were the parents of:

- Marie Charlotte de Crussol (1755–1809), who married, as his second wife, Achille Joseph Robert de Lignerac, 2nd Duke of Caylus, in 1771.
- Marie-François-Emmanuel de Crussol (1756–1843), who married Amable-Émilie de Châtillon, a daughter of Louis-Gaucher de Châtillon, Duke of Châtillon, and Adrienne de La Baume Le Blanc, suo jure Duchess of La Vallière, in 1777.

The duchess died on 13 September 1799. The duke died in Paris on 22 March 1802. He was succeeded by his only surviving son, Marie-François-Emmanuel.

French nobility
Preceded by Charles Emmanuel de Crussol d'Uzès	Duke of Uzès; 1762–1802	Succeeded by Marie-François-Emmanuel de Crussol d'Uzès
