= Emmanuel de Crussol, 3rd Duke of Uzès =

French soldier and courtier

Emmanuel de Crussol
- 3rd Duke of Uzès, Peer of France; Prince of Soyons; Count of Crussol
- Born: Emmanuel de Crussol; 31 July 1570
- Died: 19 July 1657 (aged 86)
- Noble family: Crussol
- Spouses: Claudine d'Hébrard de Saint Sulpice (m. 1601; died 1632) Marguerite de Flagheac (m. 1632, died)
- Issue: François de Crussol
- Father: Jacques de Crussol d'Uzès
- Mother: Françoise de Clermont-Tonnerre

Emmanuel de Crussol, 3rd Duke of Uzès (31 July 1570 – 19 July 1657), was a French soldier and courtier.

== Early life ==
Crussol was born on 31 July 1570 in Paris. He was the eldest son of Jacques de Crussol, 2nd Duke of Uzès, and Françoise de Clermont-Tonnerre (1550–1594). His father had inherited the barony of Acier from his mother, before inheriting the dukedom from his elder brother, Antoine de Crussol, 1st Duke of Uzès. Among his younger sisters were Louise de Crussol (who married the Baron of Rieux in 1590), Marie de Crussol (who married the Count of Rochefort in 1590), and Diane de Crussol (who married the Baron of Tor in 1594).

His paternal grandparents were Charles de Crussol, 9th Viscount of Uzès (eldest son of Jacques de Crussol), and Jeanne Ricard de Genouillac. His maternal grandparents were Antoine III, 1st Count of Clermont, and Françoise de Poitiers. His maternal uncle was Henri de Clermont, 1st Duke of Clermont-Tonnerre, and Anne de Clermont-Tonnerre (wife of Jean d'Escars, Prince of Carency).

== Career ==
In September 1584, Emmanuel succeeded his father as the 3rd Duke of Uzès at a time of considerable change within France, including King Henry III's decision to have his rival, Henry I, Duke of Guise, assassinated by his guards in the Château of Blois, ultimately leading to the end of the Valois dynasty upon Henry III's own assassination at the Château de Saint-Cloud in 1589. Reportedly, the Duke of Uzès was one of the first to rally to Henry IV and help him conquer his kingdom during the War of the Three Henrys.

=== Title and offices ===
Upon the death of the Duke of Montmorency, who was beheaded in Toulouse on 30 October 1632, the Duke of Uzès became the Dean of Peers and took the title of Premier Duke and Peer of France.

On 1 June 1656, he resigned from his position as Knight of Honour to the Queen Mother (French: chevalier d'honneur de la reine mère) in favour of his eldest son François, and retired to Florensac, where he died on 19 July 1657.

== Personal life ==
On 2 September 1601, Crussol was married to Claudine d'Hébrard de Saint Sulpice, a daughter of Bertrand III d'Hébrard de Saint Sulpice, and Marguerite de Balaguier de Montsalès. Together, they were the parents of:

- François de Crussol (1604–1680), who married Louise Henriette de La Châtre, Baroness de Maisonfort, a granddaughter of Claude de La Châtre, Baron de Maisonfort, in 1625. The widow of François de Valois d'Angoulême, Count d'Alais (son of Charles de Valois, Duke of Angoulême, himself an illegitimate son of King Charles IX), they divorced and she married Claude Pot de Rhodes, the Grand Master of Ceremonies of France, in 1633, and he married Marguerite d'Apchier, Countess of Vazeilles, daughter of Christophe, Count d'Apchier, and Marguerite de Flagheac.
- Jacques Christophe de Crussol (c. 1608–1680), who owned the Hôtel de Crussol and founded the Marquis of Saint-Sulpice branch (and was heir of his younger brother, Louis); he married Louise d'Amboise d'Aubijoux in 1637.
- Louis de Crussol (1610–1674), styled Marquis of Crussol, who became the Abbot of Figeac and Conques; he married Charlotte de Vernou Bonneuil in 1654.
- Alexandre Galliot de Crussol (d. 1680), who founded the Marquis of Montsalès branch; he married Rose d'Escars in 1647.
- Anne Gaston de Crussol (d. 1640), Baron of Florensac, who was killed at the Siege of Turin in 1640.
- Louise de Crussol (d. 1695), who married Antoine Hercule de Budos, Marquis des Portes in 1627. After his death in 1629, she married Charles de Rouvroy, Marquis of Saint-Simon de Rasse (brother to Claude de Rouvroy, 1st Duke of Saint-Simon) in 1634.

After his first wife died in c. 1632, he married Marguerite de Flagheac, the widow of Christophe, Count d'Apchier (parents of his eldest son's second wife), on 24 February 1632. She was the daughter of Pierre de Flagheac and Marguerite de Rostaing (Dame du Palais to Queen Catherine de' Medici). Together, they were the parents of:

- Armand de Crussol (1634–1663), Count of Uzès, Marquis of Cuisieux, who was murdered in Osnabrück in 1663; he married Isabelle de Veyrac de Paulhan in 1654.

The Duke died at the Château de Florensac in Florensac on 19 July 1657. He was succeeded by his eldest son, François.

French nobility
Preceded by Jacques de Crussol	Duke of Uzès; 1586–1657	Succeeded by François de Crussol
