= Jean Charles de Crussol, 7th Duke of Uzès =

French aristocrat and courtier

Jean-Charles de Crussol
- 7th Duke of Uzès
- Born: Jean-Charles de Crussol; 29 December 1675; Paris, France
- Died: 19 July 1739 (aged 63); Château d'Uzès, Uzès, France
- Noble family: Crussol
- Spouses: Princess Anna Hippolyte Grimaldi (m. 1696; died 1700) Anne Marie Marguerite de Bullion (m. 1706, died)
- Issue: Charles Emmanuel de Crussol; Jeanne Julie Françoise de Crussol
- Father: Emmanuel de Crussol, 5th Duke of Uzès
- Mother: Julie Marie de Sainte-Maure

Jean-Charles de Crussol, 7th Duke of Uzès (29 December 1675 – 19 July 1739), was a French aristocrat and courtier.

== Early life ==
Crussol was born in Paris in 1675. His eldest sister, Julie-Françoise de Crussol, married Louis Antoine de Pardaillan de Gondrin, 1st Duke of Antin. e was the third son of Emmanuel de Crussol, 5th Duke of Uzès, and Julie Marie de Sainte-Maure. His elder brother was Louis de Crussol, 6th Duke of Uzès, who was killed at the Battle of Landen.

His paternal grandparents were François de Crussol d'Uzès and Marguerite d'Apchier, Countess of Vazeilles. His mother was the only daughter and heiress of Charles de Sainte-Maure, Duke of Montausier, governor of the Dauphin, and Julie d'Angennes, Marquise of Rambouillet (who was known as Princess Julie).

== Career ==
Upon the death of his brother in 1693, he became the 7th Duke of Uzès. He was made a Chevalier des Ordres du Roi and served as Knight of Honour of the Queen Regent (French: chevalier d'honneur de la reine régente). In 1721, he exchanged with King Louis XV the land of Lévis for the rights of the King in Uzès, which considerably increased the power of the Dukes.

== Personal life ==
Crussol was twice married. His first marriage was in 1696 to Princess Anna Hippolyte Grimaldi of Monaco (1667–1700), daughter of the reigning Prince of Monaco, Louis I, and Catherine de Gramont (herself a mistress of King Louis XIV). Princess Anna died in 1700, without issue.

In a letter dated 27 July 1700, Madame la Duchesse d'Orléans, princesse Palatine, wrote : "il est affreux, il pue comme un bouc, et journellement il est ivre. Il boit avec des laquais et fais pis que cela avec eux. C'est ainsi que, sans aucun doute il aura attrapé ce vilain mal..." ["He is hideous, he reeks like a billy goat, and he is drunk every day. He drinks with lackeys and does worse than that with them. That is undoubtedly how he contracted that nasty ailment..."] (the syphilis).

=== Second marriage ===
Crussol remarried in 1706 to Anne Marie Marguerite de Bullion de Fervacques (1684–1760), a daughter of Charles-Denis de Bullion, Marquis de Bonnelles (grandson of King Louis XIII's Minister of Finance Claude de Bullion) and Anne Rouillé de Meslay. Together, they were the parents of:

- Charles-Emmanuel de Crussol (1707–1762), who married Émilie de La Rochefoucauld, the daughter of François de La Rochefoucauld, 4th Duke of La Rochefoucauld, and Charlotte Le Tellier (daughter of Louis XIV's Minister, François-Michel Le Tellier, Marquis de Louvois), in 1725.
- Jeanne Julie Françoise de Crussol (1713–1797), who married Louis César de La Baume Le Blanc, 3rd Duke of La Vallière.

The Duke died at the Château d'Uzès on 19 July 1739 and was succeeded by his only son, Charles-Emmanuel.

French nobility
Preceded by Louis de Crussol d'Uzès	Duke of Uzès; 1693–1739	Succeeded by Charles-Emmanuel de Crussol d'Uzès
