= Lords, viscounts and dukes of Uzès =

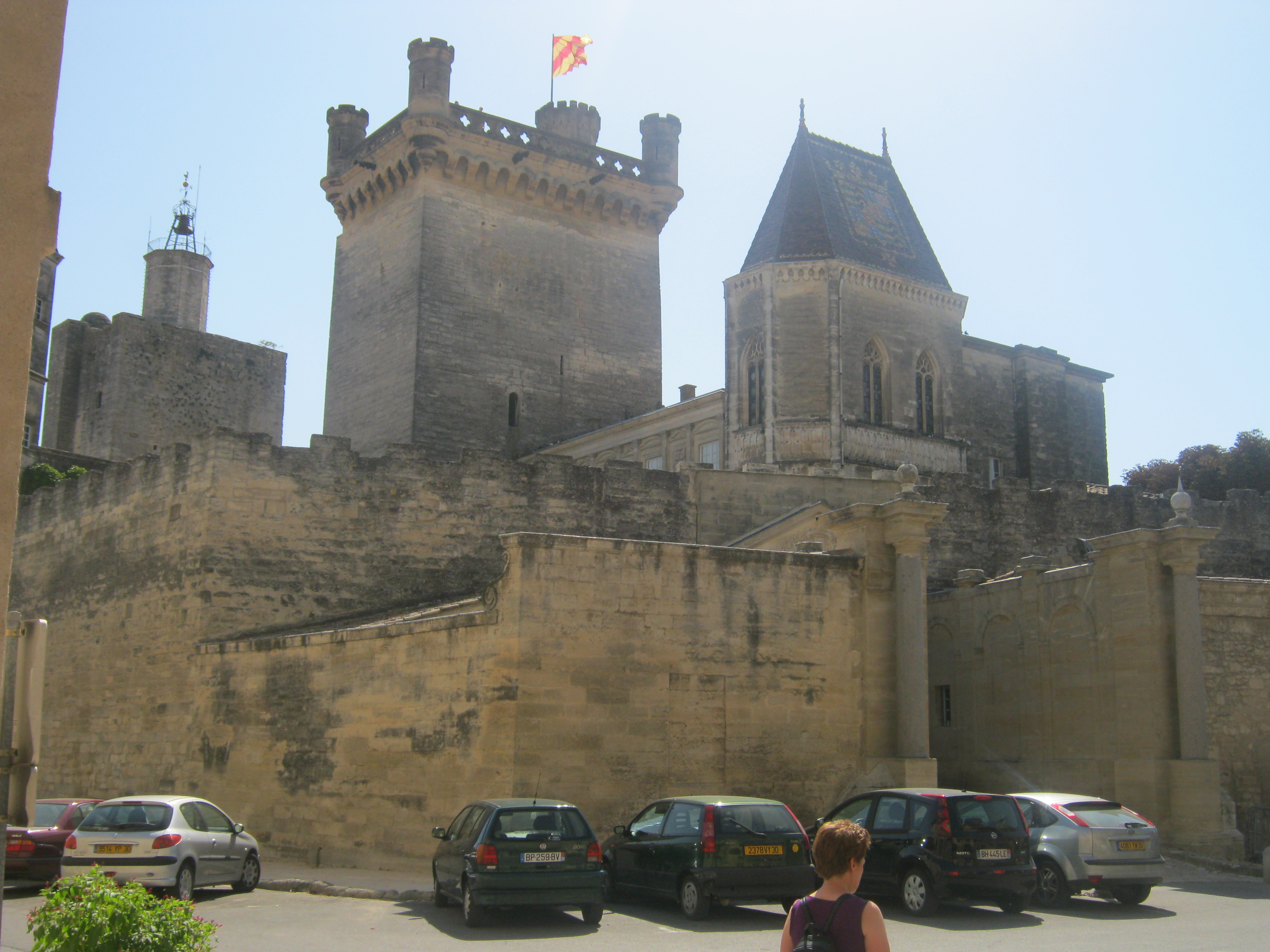
The Château du Duché in Uzès.

This is a list of the Lords, Viscounts and Dukes of Uzès, a commune located in the Gard department in France.

== Lords of Uzès (Seigneur d'Uzès) ==
Term	Name	Spouse(s)	Lived	Notes
–1125	Elzéart d'Uzès		1080–1125	
1125–1138	Decan d'Uzès	daughter of the Lord of Posquières	1110–1138	
1138–1181	Bermond I d'Uzès	Douce de Mézoargues	1105–1181	
1181–1209	Raymond Rascas d'Uzès	Clothilde	1163–1209	
1209–1254	Bermond II d'Uzès	Géraude d'Adjémar de Rochemaure	1209–1254	
1254–1285	Decan II d'Uzès	Hermingarde d'Alais (of Alès)	1254–1285	
1285–1318	Bermond III d'Uzès	Alix	1250–1318	

== Viscounts of Uzès (Vicomte d'Uzès) ==
In 1328 Robert (holder of the viguerie), obtained the title of Viscount of Uzès from the King of France, due to his services. His descendants, heirs to the title, henceforth paid homage to the King of France and no longer to the Bishop of Uzès. The title then passed, by marriage, to the Guérin family, then to that of Crussol.

No.	Term	Name	Spouse(s)	Lived	Notes
1st	1328–c. 1350	Robert I	Guiote de Posquières	c. 1275–c. 1350	Created viscount in 1328
2nd	c. 1350–1361	Decan III d'Uzès	Agathe de Baux	1330–1361	Son of preceding.
3rd	1361–1374	Raymond d'Uzès			Son of preceding. Died without issue.
4th	1374–1390	Alzias d'Uzès	Dauphine de la Roche	1340–1390	Brother of preceding.
5th	1390–c. 1430	Robert II d'Uzès	Gilette de Pressigny	1380–c. 1430	Son of preceding. Viscount under the guardianship of his mother.
6th	c. 1430–1475	Jéhan d'Uzès	Anne de Brancas	c. 1430–1475	Son of preceding. An only daughter, Simone, who married twice, hence the two following viscounts.
7th	c. 1460–1485	Jéhan Guérin de Châteauneuf	Simone d'Uzès	1460–1485	Married Simone d'Uzès in 1485, taking the name and arms of the Uzès.
8th	1486–1525	Jacques de Crussol	Simone d'Uzès	c. 1465–1525	Married Simone d'Uzès in 1486, also taking the name and arms of the Uzès.
9th	1525–1546	Charles de Crussol	Jeanne Ricard de Genouilhac	1487–1546	Son of preceding. His son, Antoine, was made Duke of Uzès in 1556.

== Dukes of Uzès (Duc d'Uzès) ==
The viscounty of Uzès became a duchy by letters patent of Charles IX issued at Mont-de-Marsan in May 1565. The dukes were included in the peerage of France from 1572, and if the Kingdom of France existed today, they would rank immediately after the Princes of the Blood.

No.	Term	Name	Spouse(s)	Lived	Notes
1st	1546–1573	Antoine de Crussol	Louise de Clermont	1528–1573	Viscounty raised to duchy in 1565.
2nd	1573–1586	Jacques II de Crussol	Françoise de Clermont	1540–1586	Brother of preceding.
3rd	1586–1657	Emmanuel I de Crussol	Claudine d'Ebrard	1570–1657	Son of preceding.
4th	1657–1680	François de Crussol	Marguerite d'Apchier	1604–1680	Son of preceding.
5th	1680–1692	Emmanuel II de Crussol	Julie Marie de Sainte-Maure	1637–1692	Son of preceding.
6th	1692–1693	Louis de Crussol	-	1673–1693	Son of preceding. Killed in battle, no issue.
7th	1693–1739	Jean Charles de Crussol	(1) Princess Anna Hippolyte of Monaco (2) Marguerite de Bullion	1675–1739	Brother of preceding.
8th	1739–1762	Charles Emmanuel de Crussol	Emilie de la Rochefoucauld	1707–1762	Son of preceding.
9th	1762–1802	François Emmanuel de Crussol	Julie de Pardaillan	1728–1802	Son of preceding.
10th	1802–1842	Marie François Emmanuel de Crussol	Emilie de Châtillon	1756–1843	Son of preceding.
11th	1842–1872	Géraud de Crussol d'Uzès	Françoise de Talhouët	1808–1872	Grandson of preceding.
12th	1872–1878	Emmanuel de Crussol d'Uzès	Anne de Rochechouart de Mortemart	1840–1878	Son of preceding.
13th	1878–1893	Jacques de Crussol d'Uzès	-	1870–1893	Son of preceding.
14th	1893–1943	Louis de Crussol d'Uzès	(1) Marie Thérèse d'Albert (2) Josefina Angela Martínez	1871–1943	Brother of preceding.
15th	1943–1999	Emmanuel Jacques de Crussol d'Uzès	(1) Carolyn Baily Brown (2) Margaret "Peggy" d'Arenberg (3) Andrée Guille	1927–1999	Grandson of preceding.
16th	1999–2001	Louis-Frédéric de Crussol d'Uzès	(1) Françoise Marque (2) Elisabeth de Belleville (3) Jeannine Rolande-Coudouneau	1925–2001	Cousin of preceding.
17th	2001–	Jacques de Crussol d'Uzès	Alessandra Passerin d'Entrèves e Courmayeur	1957–	Son of preceding.

== See also ==
- List of French dukedoms
- List of French peerages
