= Emmanuel-Henri-Charles de Crussol =

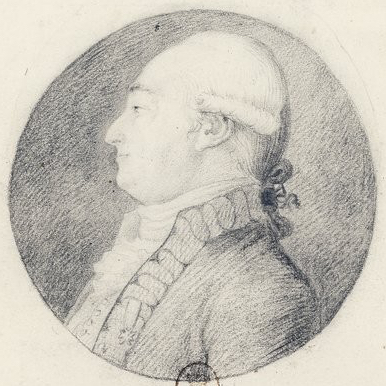
de Crussol in 1790 by Jean-Michel Moreau.

Emmanuel-Henri-Charles, baron of Crussol d'Uzès (11 October 1741 – 7 July 1818) was a French politician and general. He was a knight of the Order of Saint Louis and Order of Our Lady of Mount Carmel.

When he died in 1818 the Crussol barons branch died out. The other branch was that of the dukes of Crussol d'Uzès, which survived.

== Family ==
He was born in Paris into the Crussol d'Uzès family. He was the son of Pierre-Emmanuel de Crussol, marquis of Crussol and of Florensac, marshal, minister plenipotentiary to the court of Parma and knight of the king's orders (1717-1758) (younger branch descended from Louis, younger son of duke François) and his wife Charlotte Fleuriau de Morville (1725-1810). He was also a brother of Alexandre-Charles-Emmanuel de Crussol, bailiff of the Knights Hospitaller, which whom he sat in the Estates General of 1789, and a grandson of Charles-Jean-Baptiste Fleuriau de Morville, secretary of state for the navy and then for foreign affairs, and a member of the Académie Française.

== Life ==
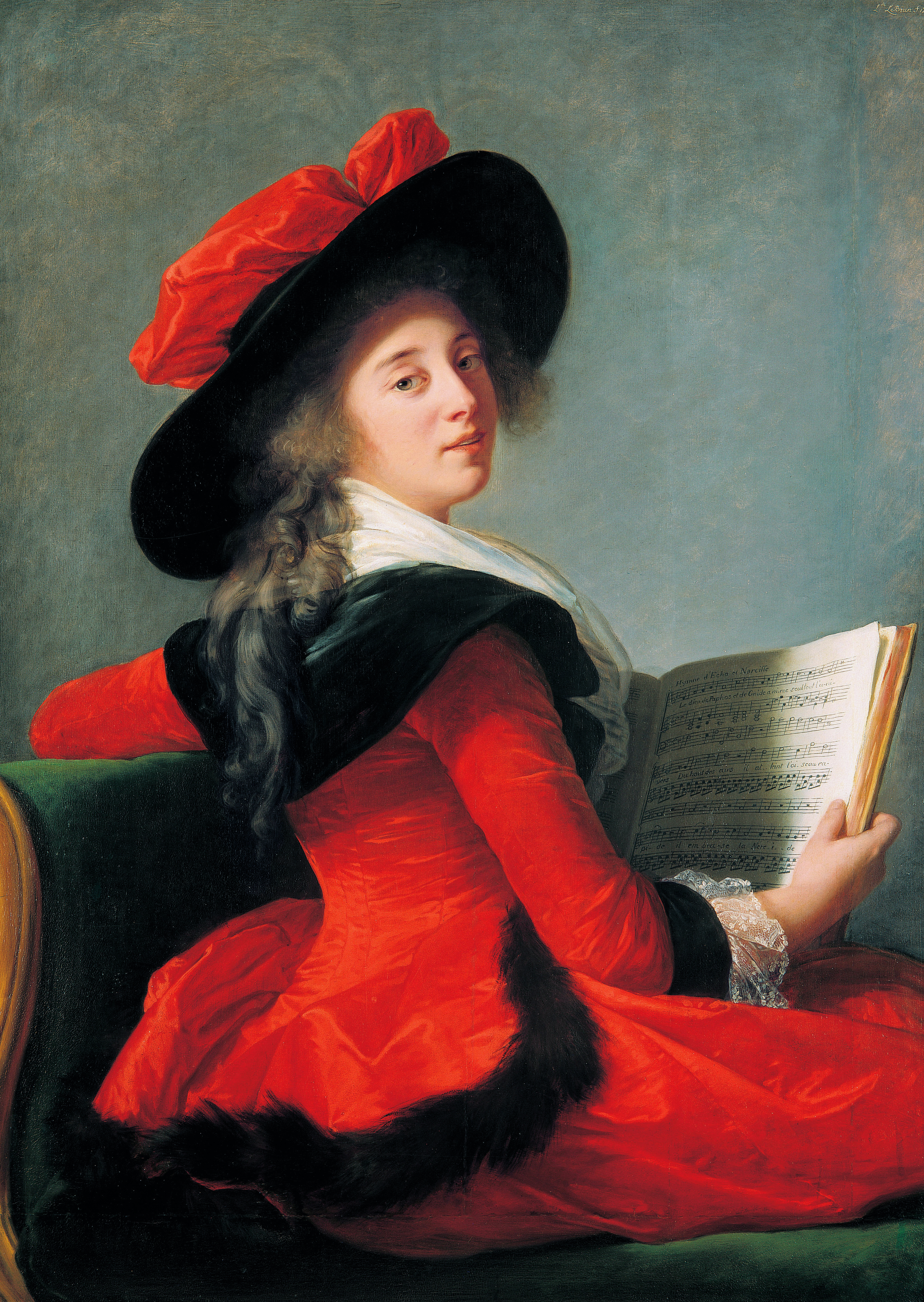
Portrait of the baroness of Crussol, 1785, by Élisabeth Vigée Le Brun musée des Augustins de Toulouse.

He joined the army as a musketeer, then as a sous-lieutenant in the king's infantry regiment in 1756, rising to lieutenant en second in 1757 and captain in 1759. He was made a colonel in the grenadiers de France regiment then in 1770 colonel of the régiment de Berry. In 1780, he was promoted to brigadier and the following year to maréchal de camp.

On 20 February 1770 he married Bonne Marie Gabrielle Joséphine Bernard de Boulainvilliers (Paris, Saint Eustache parish, 7 November 1752 - Paris, 7 April 1829), daughter of Anne Gabriel Bernard de Boulainvilliers, lord of Passy, Glisolles, Prévôt de Paris, president of the Parlement de Paris (1724-1798) and of his second wife, Adrienne Marie Madeleine d'Hallencourt (1725-1781).

He was also governor-châtelain of the great tour in Laon and 'grand bailli d'épée' of the bailiwick and royal seat of the town and county of Bar-sur-Seine. That bailiwick made him deputy for the nobility at the Estates General of 1789 on 24 March that year. He sat on the right, defending Roman Catholicism and the monarchy and on 4 January 1790 protesting against the suppression of the Order of Malta. On 19 April 1790 he pronounced in favour of Roman Catholicism as the state religion, but the following year he took the military oath of allegiance after the king's departure, though he did protest against the new constitution in September 1791.

He, his wife and his two sisters then left revolutionary France and served in the armée des Princes until it was disbanded. Afterwards he settled in England until returning to France in 1803 after the amnesty on émigrés returning. He kept his distance from the imperial regime and on 23 August 1814 the returned Louis XVIII made him lieutenant general in the royal army - he still held that rank on his retirement. He died in 1818 at the château d'Ozonville in Athis-Mons, where he had been living since 1813 and where both he and later his wife were buried.. His wife outlived him by eleven years and on her death left the château to her sister's granddaughter Félicité de Faudoas (1807-1877), wife of Pons Philippe de Villeneuve.

== Sources ==
- (in French) "Emmanuel-Henri-Charles de Crussol", in Adolphe Robert and Gaston Cougny, Dictionnaire des parlementaires français (1789–1891), Bourloton, Paris, 1889 Edition details Wikisource
