= Emmanuel de Crussol, 15th Duke of Uzès =

French aristocrat and chemical engineer (1927–1999)

Emmanuel de Crussol
- 15th Duke of Uzès
- Full name: Emmanuel Jacques Géraud Marie de Crussol
- Born: 19 July 1927; Paris, France
- Died: 8 September 1999 (aged 72); Montpellier, France
- Noble family: House of Crussol
- Spouses: Carolyn Baily Brown (m. 1946; div. 1947) Margaret, Princess-Duchess d'Arenberg (m. 1968; died 1977)
- Issue: 5

Emmanuel de Crussol, 15th Duke of Uzès (19 July 1927 – 8 September 1999) was a French aristocrat who worked in Morocco as a chemical engineer.

== Early life ==
Emmanuel was born in Paris on 19 July 1927 as heir to the dukedom of Uzès, the oldest and premier dukedom in France which had been created by King Charles IX in 1565. (Note: The viscounty of Uzès became a duchy by letters patent of Charles IX issued at Mont-de-Marsan in May 1565. The dukes were included in the peerage of France from 1572, and if the Kingdom of France existed today, they would rank immediately after the Princes of the Blood.) He was the only son of Géraud François Marie Paul de Crussol d'Uzès (1897–1929), styled Duke of Crussol, and the former Evelyn Anne Gordon (1897–1947), who married in France in 1921. His father died in 1929, just two years after his birth, and he succeeded to the dukedom of Crussol, traditionally vested to the heir apparent of the Dukes of Uzès. He succeeded to the dukedom of Uzès upon the death of his paternal grandfather in 1943, and his mother died in 1947.

His maternal grandparents were Scots-American millionaire John Gordon and Rosalie Georgina (née Murray) Gordon of New York and London. His maternal aunt was Vera Seton (née Gordon) Guthrie, Lady Swettenham, the second wife of Sir Frank Swettenham. His paternal grandparents were Louis Emmanuel de Crussol, 14th Duke of Uzès, and, his first wife, Thérèse d'Albert de Luynes (a daughter of the 10th Duke of Chaulnes and Sophie, Princess Galitzine). His grandfather, who married the American Josephine Angela in 1939 after his divorce from Thérèse, was the second son of Emmanuel de Crussol, 12th Duke of Uzès and the former Anne de Rochechouart de Mortemart (who inherited the Château de Boursault and a large fortune from her great-grandmother, Madame Clicquot Ponsardin, the founder of the Veuve Clicquot). His grandfather's elder brother was the 13th Duke of Uzès (who died in 1893 during a colonial expedition in Africa), and his grandfather's two sisters both married Dukes, Simone to Honoré d'Albert, 10th Duke of Luynes, and Mathilde to François de Cossé Brissac, 11th Duke of Brissac.

As his father predeceased him, he inherited the dukedom upon his grandfather's death in 1943.

== Education and career ==
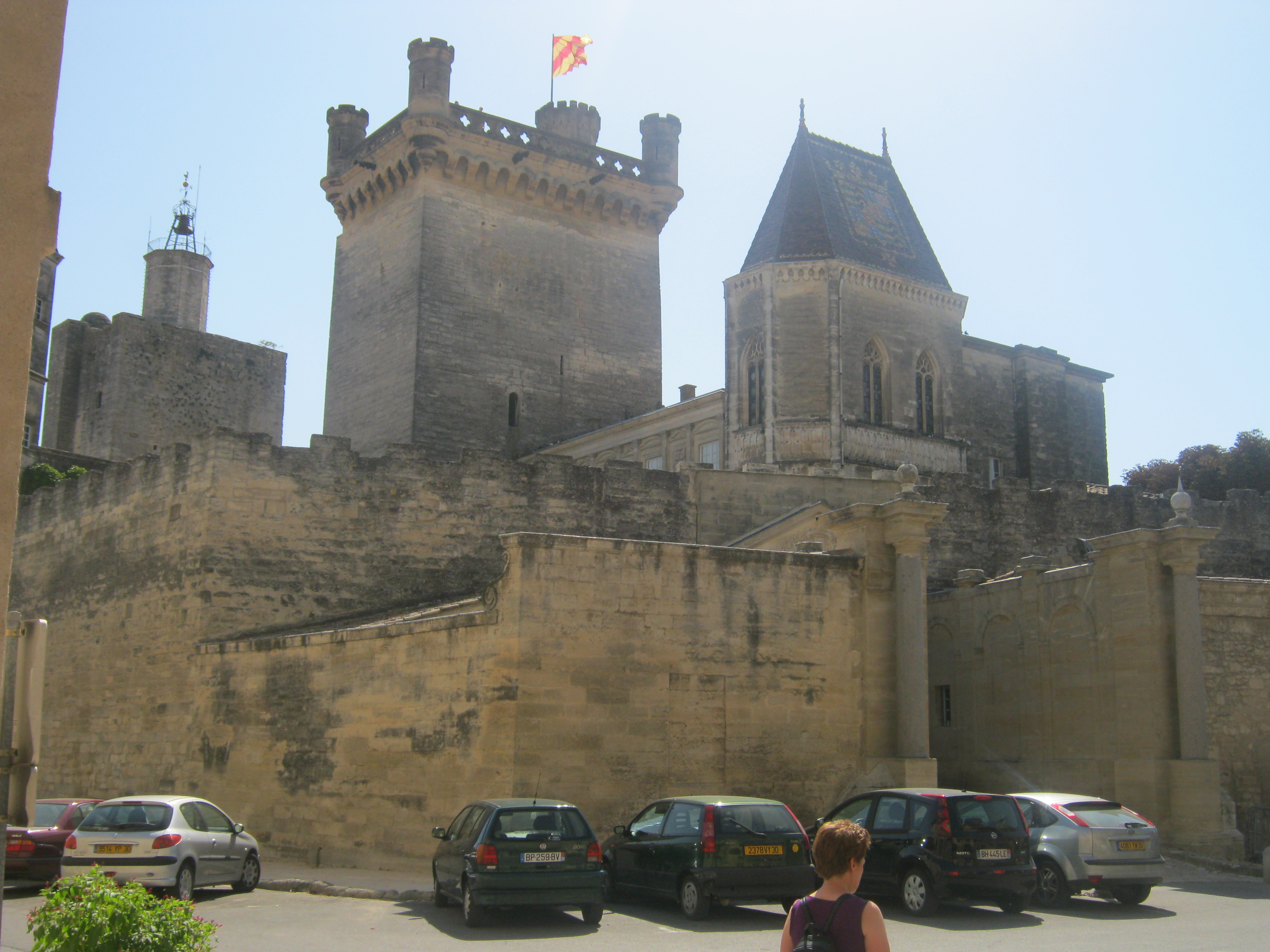
The Château de Duché in Uzès.

The Duke attended boarding school at École des Roches in Normandy and St. Paul's in New Hampshire before graduating from the Portsmouth Priory School in Portsmouth, Rhode Island. He served with the First Hussars of the Second Regiment, French Army, and with the Military Attaché's office at the French Embassy in Washington.

He spoke English, French and Spanish fluently, and had lived in the United States, France, Morocco, Egypt and the Dominican Republic liked to vacation in Austria and Switzerland and visit England where he stayed at Claridge's. When in England, he would go shooting at the Duke of Rutland's estate and visit the Maharaja of Jaipur at Ascot. The Duke owned a four-bedroom apartment in Paris (off the Avenue Foch in the 16th arrondissement), a home in Rabat, and his family's ancestral castle, the Château du Duché, in the town of Uzès. (Note: Upon the death of his great-grandmother Anne de Rochechouart de Mortemart, the Dowager Duchess of Uzès, in 1933, "the string of castles, a private island, and thousands of acres were sold.")

A chemical engineer, he lived primarily in Rabat, where he managed several companies in Morocco. Although he held no formal role within the French government, he took on assignments during the Algerian War and represented France unofficially to his friends in North African governments. The Duke, who considered himself a liberal, "supported President Charles de Gaulle's decision to get out of Algeria for both practical and idealistic reasons" stating "After all, it was a colonial occupation, and, of course, oppressive".

== Personal life ==
On 18 July 1946, the Duke was married to Carolyn Baily Brown (1925–1977) in Raleigh, North Carolina. A daughter of Col. Edward Fisher Brown, and sister of producer David Brown, Carolyn had been educated at the Brearley School in New York and studied art at Columbia and Stanford University. Before the marriage was annulled in Paris in 1947, they were the parents of:

- Nathalie de Crussol (b. 1947 2020)

He later had other children, but illegitimate

- Emmanuelle de Crussol d’Uzès (b.1959) twin
- Nathalie de crussol d’uzès (b.1959) twin
- Anne-Elisabeth de Crussol d’Uzès (b.1982)

After their divorce, Carolyn remarried to Geoffrey Carpenter Doyle, of Santurce, Puerto Rico and Southampton, New York, in 1949. Doyle was a grandson of architect James Edwin Ruthven Carpenter Jr. and a grandnephew of Bishop Ernest M. Stires.

=== Second marriage ===
On 5 July 1968, he was married to Margaret "Peggy" (née Bedford) d'Arenberg at the Villa Taylor in Morocco by Si Jilali Chajai, the Pasha of Marrakesh, with Man Singh II (the Maharaja of Jaipur and Indian Ambassador in Madrid) as the Duke's best man and Madeline, the Countess de Breteuil as Peggy's attendant. The only other attendant at the wedding was Jean Guillon, the French counsel at Marrakesh. Peggy, the only child of Standard Oil director Frederick Henry Bedford Jr., was divorced from the American textile executive Thomas M. Bancroft Jr. (with whom she had a daughter) in 1960, and widowed from the French Prince Charles, 3rd Duke d'Arenberg in 1967 (with who she had a son, Prince Pierre d'Arenberg, 4th Duke of Arenberg) .

While the Duke was in Morocco, Peggy died in a car crash while en route back to their home in Paris after attending a ball at the home of real estate developer Robert de Balkany near Rambouillet in 1977.

The Duke died on 8 September 1999 at Montpellier in Hérault, France. Upon his death, lacking a legitimate son, his cousin Louis de Crussol d'Uzès (the son of his uncle, Emmanuel, Marquis of Crussol), became the 16th Duke of Uzès.

== See also ==
- Viscounts and Dukes of Uzès

== Notes ==
French nobility
| Preceded by Louis de Crussol d'Uzès | Duke of Uzès; 1943–1999 | Succeeded by Louis de Crussol d'Uzès |
