= Emmanuel de Crussol, 10th Duke of Uzès =

French soldier and politician

Marie-François-Emmanuel de Crussol
- 10th Duke of Uzès
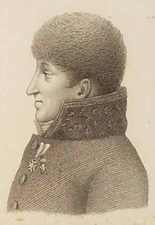
- Born: Marie-François-Emmanuel de Crussol; 30 December 1756; Paris, France
- Died: 5 August 1843 (aged 86); Bonnelles, France
- Noble family: See Crussol
- Spouse: Emilie de Châtillon (m. 1777; died 1840)
- Issue: Adrien-François-Emmanuel de Crussol; Célestine de Crussol d'Uzès
- Father: François Emmanuel de Crussol d'Uzès
- Mother: Julie-Magdeleine de Pardaillan

Marie-François-Emmanuel de Crussol, 10th Duke of Uzès (30 December 1756 – 6 August 1843), was a French soldier and politician.

== Early life ==
He was the eldest son of François Emmanuel de Crussol, 9th Duke of Uzès (1728–1802), and of the Julie-Magdeleine de Pardaillan de Gondrin (d. 1799). His elder sister, Marie Charlotte de Crussol, married, as his second wife, Achille Joseph Robert de Lignerac, 2nd Duke of Caylus, in 1771.

His paternal grandparents were Charles Emmanuel de Crussol, 8th Duke of Uzès and Émilie de La Rochefoucauld (daughter of François de La Rochefoucauld, 4th Duke of La Rochefoucauld). His maternal grandparents were Louis de Pardaillan de Gondrin, 2nd Duke of Antin, and Françoise-Gillonne de Montmorency (a granddaughter of François-Henri de Montmorency, Duke of Luxembourg).

== Career ==
Crussol served as Colonel of the Duke of Berry's Regiment in 1789, he emigrated during the French Revolution and served in the Army of Condé with the rank of Maréchal de camp. From March 1797 until returning to France, he was at the Russian court in Saint Petersburg, alongside his sister-in-law, Louise Emmanuelle de Châtillon, who had become Princess of Taranto upon marrying Charles Bretagne Marie de La Trémoille, 9th Duke of Thouars.

He returned to France during the Restoration and obtained restitution of his properties which had been confiscated as national property: notably the ducal Château d'Uzès and the Bonnelles estate (today in the department of Yvelines), whose château built shortly before the Revolution, had been demolished. Nevertheless, smaller houses remained, including the one where he died in 1843, before the construction of the current château, in the heart of an estate which he had considerably enlarged.

He was appointed lieutenant general and Peer of France on 4 June 1814. In the Chamber of Peers, he constantly voted with the Ultras and spoke out for death during the trial of Marshal Ney. He was made a Knight of the Order of the Holy Spirit in 1825. On 29 May 1825, at the coronation of Charles X, he replaced Louis Henri, Prince of Condé as Grand Master of France at the time of the coronation.

After the July Revolution in 1830, he refused to take the oath to the July Monarchy and then left the Upper House.

== Personal life ==
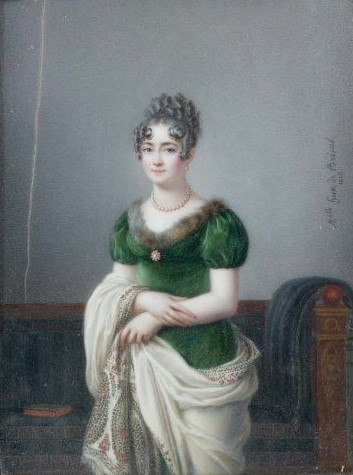
Portrait of his daughter, Célestine, 1818

In 1777, Crussol married Amable-Émilie de Châtillon, Duchess of Châtillon (d. 1840), a daughter of Louis Gaucher, Duke of Châtillon, and Adrienne Emilie Félicité de La Baume Le Blanc, suo jure Duchess of Châtillon (only daughter of Louis César de La Baume Le Blanc, Duke of La Vallière, and Jeanne Julie Françoise de Crussol, sister of the 8th Duke of Uzès). Together, Émilie and Emmanuel had two children:

- Adrien-François-Emmanuel de Crussol (1778–1837), styled Duke of Crussol, who married Catherine Victoire Victurnienne de Rochechouart-Mortemart, a daughter of Victurnien de Rochechouart, 10th Duke of Mortemart, and Anne-d'Harcourt (only daughter of François-Henri d'Harcourt, Duke of Harcourt), in 1807.
- Alexandrine Célestine Zoé Emmanuelle Thimarette de Crussol (1785–1866), who married Alexis Bonabes, Marquess of Rougé, in 1804.

The Duke died at his Bonnelles estate on 6 August 1843. As his only son predeceased him, he was succeeded by his grandson, Géraud Armand de Crussol.

French nobility
Preceded by François Emmanuel de Crussol d'Uzès	Duke of Uzès; 1802–1842	Succeeded by Géraud Armand de Crussol d'Uzès
