= Charles Emmanuel de Crussol, 8th Duke of Uzès =

Historical French aristocrat

Charles-Emmanuel de Crussol
- 8th Duke of Uzès
- Born: Charles-Emmanuel de Crussol; 11 January 1707; Paris, France
- Died: 3 February 1762 (aged 55); Paris, France
- Noble family: Crussol
- Spouse: Émilie de La Rochefoucauld
- Issue: François-Emmanuel de Crussol; Charles-Emmanuel de Crussol; Charlotte-Émilie de Crussol
- Father: Jean Charles de Crussol d'Uzès
- Mother: Anne Marie Marguerite de Bullion de Fervacques

Charles-Emmanuel de Crussol, 8th Duke of Uzès (11 January 1707 – 3 February 1762), was a French aristocrat, politician and soldier.

== Early life ==
Crussol was born in Paris on 11 January 1707. He was the eldest son of Jean Charles de Crussol, 7th Duke of Uzès (1675–1739), and, his second wife, Anne Marie Marguerite de Bullion de Fervacques (1684–1760). His father was widowed from his first wife, Princess Anna Hippolyte Grimaldi of Monaco (daughter of the reigning Prince of Monaco, Louis I, and the former Catherine de Gramont, herself a mistress of King Louis XIV). From his parents' marriage, he had a younger sister, Jeanne Julie Françoise de Crussol, who married Louis César de La Baume Le Blanc, 3rd Duke of La Vallière. His father became duke in 1693 following the death of his unmarried elder brother, Louis de Crussol, 6th Duke of Uzès.

His paternal grandparents were Emmanuel de Crussol, 5th Duke of Uzès, and Julie Marie de Sainte-Maure (a daughter of Charles de Sainte-Maure, duc de Montausier and Julie d'Angennes). His maternal grandparents were Charles-Denis de Bullion, Marquis de Bonnelles (grandson of King Louis XIII's Minister of Finance Claude de Bullion) and Anne Rouillé de Meslay.

== Career ==
In 1729, during the Ancien régime, he served as a deputy for the nobility to the Estates of Languedoc. In 1731, at the Battle of Parma, he received a terrible wound which made him hunchbacked. Upon the death of his father in 1739, he became the 8th Duke of Uzès.

The Duke was a book collector, and exchanged correspondence with Voltaire.

== Personal life ==
In 1725, Crussol was married to Émilie de La Rochefoucauld (1700–1753), the daughter of François de La Rochefoucauld, 4th Duke of La Rochefoucauld, and Charlotte Le Tellier (daughter of Louis XIV's Minister, François-Michel Le Tellier, Marquis de Louvois). Together, they were the parents of three children:

- François-Emmanuel de Crussol (1728–1802), who married Julie-Magdeleine de Pardaillan de Gondrin, youngest daughter of Louis de Pardaillan de Gondrin, 2nd Duke of Antin, and Françoise-Gillonne de Montmorency (a granddaughter of François-Henri de Montmorency, Duke of Luxembourg), in 1753.
- Charles-Emmanuel de Crussol (1730–1743), who died young.
- Charlotte-Émilie de Crussol (1732–1791), who married, as his second wife, Louis-Marie de Rohan-Chabot, 5th Duke of Rohan, a grandson of Louis, Duke of Rohan and Antoine Gaston de Roquelaure, in 1758.

The duchess died at the Château de Bonnelles on 25 February 1753. The duke died in Paris on 3 February 1762. He was succeeded by his only surviving son, François-Emmanuel.

French nobility
Preceded by Jean Charles de Crussol d'Uzès	Duke of Uzès; 1739–1762	Succeeded by François Emmanuel de Crussol d'Uzès
