= Emmanuel de Crussol, 5th Duke of Uzès =

French soldier, diplomat and courtier

Emmanuel II de Crussol
- 5th Duke of Uzès, Peer of France; Prince of Soyons; Marquis of Florensac; Count of Apchier
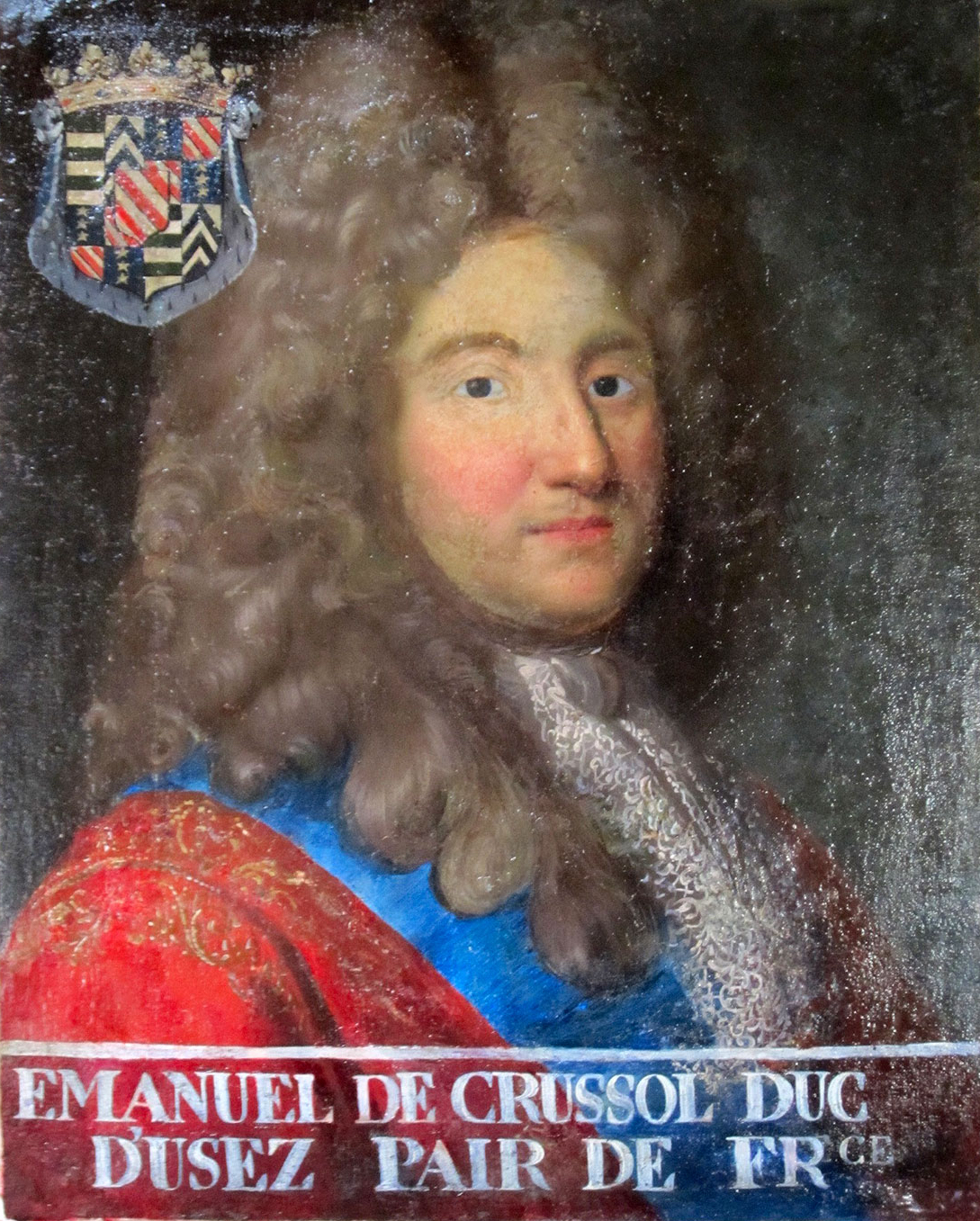
- Born: Emmanuel de Crussol; 5 January 1642; Assier, Quercy, France
- Died: 1 July 1692 (aged 50); Paris, France
- Noble family: Crussol
- Spouse: Julie-Marie de Sainte-Maure (m. 1664; died 1692)
- Issue: Julie-Françoise de Crussol; Thérèse-Marguerite de Crussol; Louis de Crussol; Catherine-Louise de Crussol; Jean Charles de Crussol; Louis de Crussol; François de Crussol; Felix-Louis de Crussol
- Father: François de Crussol d'Uzès
- Mother: Marguerite d'Apchier

Emmanuel II de Crussol, 5th Duke of Uzès (5 January 1642 – 1 July 1692), was a French soldier, diplomat and courtier. He fought in Hungary against the Turks during the Austro-Turkish War, then in the Rhineland during the Third Anglo-Dutch War. He also served as governor of Saintonge and Angoulême.

== Early life ==
Crussol was born at the Château d'Assier in Assier on 5 January 1642. He was the eldest son of François de Crussol, 4th Duke of Uzès, and, his second wife, Marguerite d'Apchier, Countess of Vazeilles. He was previously married to Henriette of La Châtre. His youngest brother, Louis de Crussol-Florensac, married Marie-Louise-Thérèse de St-Nectaire-Lestrange-Cheylane in 1688, and his sister, Suzanne de Crussol d'Uzès, a Benedictine nun who was Abbess of Yerres from 1691 to 1709.

His paternal grandparents were Emmanuel de Crussol, 3rd Duke of Uzès, and Claudine d'Hébrard de Saint Sulpice (daughter of Bertrand d'Hébrard de Saint Sulpice). His maternal grandparents were Christophe, Count d'Apchier, and Marguerite de Flagheac. After his maternal grandfather died in 1630, his maternal grandmother married his paternal grandfather, the 3rd Duke of Uzès, who had been widowed in c. 1632.

== Career ==
He volunteered as an officer in the Austro-Turkish War to fight in Hungary against the Turks who were commanded by the Grand Vizier Köprülüzade Fazıl Ahmed Pasha. These invaders had crossed the Danube at Bad with 100,000 men, and advanced to the gates of Pressburg and Olmütz. During the war, King Louis XIV sent 6,000 Frenchmen to support Emperor Leopold, placed under the command of the Count Jean de Coligny-Saligny, a rebel who had returned from exile with the Prince of Condé. On 1 August 1664, the attack was launched by all the Turkish forces, and the battle seemed lost for the Imperials when the French moved. Reportedly, when Ahmed Köprülüzade saw the French nobility emerge with their lace and blond wigs, he asked "who were these young girls?" These horsemen rushed towards the ranks of the janissaries of the Grand Vizier, and the Imperial Army, rekindled by this example, charged along the entire line. The Turks gave way and fled towards the river to cross it again. Following this victory, a twenty-year truce was signed between the emperor Leopold and the Grand Vizier.

He then took part in the Third Anglo-Dutch War. As a reward for his services and his courage, he was charged with bringing the news of the capture of the Gallas forts in the Vosges to King Louis XIV at Fontainebleau. He was made Colonel of Infantry (French: colonel d'infanterie) following the resignation of his father-in-law, the Duke of Montausier, giving him the power to choose the officers of his regiment and to propose them to the Minister.

On 7 March 1674, at age 32, he became the premier Duke and peer of France following the resignation of his father, François de Crussol, in his favour. In this capacity, he played an important role in the marriage of Marie Louise d'Orléans with King Charles II of Spain who, by one of the clauses of the 1676 Treaty of Nijmegen, was to marry a French princess.

He retained the favor of the King of France for a long time, even after the scandal known as "the 8 cap": in 1681, the Parlement of Paris held a solemn audience for the reception of the Count of Châlons. The first president, Nicolas Potier de Novion, contrary to established practice, remained covered while calling the roll of the peers and only uncovered himself when he came to the Princes of the Blood. When it came time to vote, the peers were in the habit of uncovering themselves, but seeing what had just happened, the Duke of Uzès lost patience, pushed down his hat and nodded with a threatening air. All the peers imitated him, then all went to complain to the King, but Louis XIV refused to get involved. In 1688, he was named Knight of the Order of the Holy Spirit.

Louis XIV, wishing to marry the Duke of Maine to one of the great houses of the Kingdom, thought of Louise de Crussol, the last daughter of the Duke of Uzès. As the King was on the point of declaring it, the Marquis of Barbezieux (third son of the King's War Minister Louvois, came to inform him of his marriage with her, and the King thought nothing more of it." Everything is conjuncture in this life," said Marshal Philippe de Clérambault, Count of Palluau," and the destiny of Mademoiselle d'Uzès is proof of this."

== Personal life ==
On 16 March 1664, while known as the Count of Crussol, he married Julie-Marie de Sainte-Maure (1646–1695), the only daughter and heiress of Charles de Sainte-Maure, Duke of Montausier, governor of the Dauphin, and Julie d'Angennes, Marquise of Rambouillet (who was known as Princess Julie). Together, they were the parents of eight children:

- Julie-Françoise de Crussol (–1742), who married Louis Antoine de Pardaillan de Gondrin, 1st Duke of Antin, son of Louis Henri de Pardaillan, and Madame de Montespan, in 1686.
- Thérèse-Marguerite de Crussol (1671–1671), who died young.
- Louis de Crussol (1673–1693), who was unmarried when he was killed at the Battle of Landen.
- Catherine-Louise de Crussol (1674–1694), who married Louis François Marie Le Tellier, Marquis of Barbezieux in 1691, despite Louis XIV wanting her to marry to the Duke of Maine.
- Jean Charles de Crussol (1675–1739), who married Princess Anna Hippolyte Grimaldi of Monaco, the daughter of the reigning Prince of Monaco, Louis I, and Catherine de Gramont (herself a mistress of King Louis XIV) in 1696. After her death in 1700, he married Anne Marie Marguerite de Bullion de Fervacques in 1706.
- Louis de Crussol (1677–1694), who became a Canon, but was known as the Abbot of Uzès.
- François de Crussol (1679–1736), styled, Count of Uzès, a Lieutenant General of the King's Armies and Master of the Cavalry Camp who became Governor of Oléron; he married Madeleine Charlotte Pasquier de Franclieu. After her death in 1713, he married Marie-Anne Commeau, the widow of Pierre Bailleul.
- Felix-Louis de Crussol (1681–1712), known as d'Aymargues, who became Canon of Strasbourg.

The Duke and Duchess separated in 1685, with the Duchess occupying apartment in the princes' wing at the Court of Louis XIV in Versailles, overlooking the corner of the old wing of the château (today located behind the Gallery of Battles). The Duke died in Paris on 1 July 1692 and the Duchess died at the Hôtel de Rambouillet in Paris in 1695. He was succeeded by his eldest son, Louis. After Louis was killed at the Battle of Landen in 1693, his second son, Jean Charles, became the 7th duke.

French nobility
Preceded by François de Crussol d'Uzès	Duke of Uzès; 1680–1692	Succeeded by Louis de Crussol d'Uzès
