= Jacques de Crussol =

- 8th Viscount of Uzès
- Born: 1460
- Died: 24 October 1525 (aged 64–65)
- Noble family: House of Crussol
- Spouse: Simone d'Uzès (m. 1486)
- Issue: Charles de Crussol; André de Crussol; Marie de Crussol; Marie de Crussol; Madeleine de Crussol; Jeanne de Crussol; Anne de Crussol; Jeanne La Jeune de Crussol
- Father: Louis Bastet de Crussol
- Mother: Jeanne de Lévis-Mirepoix

Jacques de Crussol, 8th Viscount of Uzès (1460 – 24 October 1525) was a French courtier and senior royal official. He was a member of the Crussol family and gained the title of 8th Viscount of Uzès by marrying the heiress of that title.

== Early life ==
He was born in 1460 as the eldest son of Louis Bastet, Lord of Crussol (Sénéchal of Poitou and Grand Panetier of France), and his wife Jeanne de Lévis-Mirepoix. His elder sister, Louise de Crussol, married François I de La Rochefoucauld, Chamberlain to kings Charles VIII and Louis XII.

== Career ==
He received a relatively small inheritance of the Château de Crussol, which was later abandoned in favour of the Château d'Uzès after he married Simone d'Uzès and became Viscount of Uzès. In addition to the viscounty, his wife also brought him the baronies of Lévis and Florensac. On the death of his father, he inherited the lordship of Crussol. He was made Sénéchal of Beaucaire and Nîmes in 1504 and remained so until his resignation in 1523, in favor of his son.

He served in a number of important offices, including Grand Chamberlain of France (Grand chambellan de France), Grand Panetier of France (Grand panetier de France), Governor of Dauphiné, and Captain of 200 archers of the Royal Guard in February 1504.

== Personal life ==
On 24 June 1486, he married Simone d'Uzès, the only child and heiress of Jéhan d'Uzès, 6th Viscount of Uzès, and his wife Anne de Brancas. Her father's viscounty had passed to her first husband, Jean Guérin de Châteauneuf, upon the 6th Viscount's death in 1475. However, Guérin died in 1485 without any children, so upon Simone's marriage to Jacques de Crussol, their two houses were joined on the condition that the House of Crussol would thereafter accept both the name of the House of Uzès and its coat of arms, incorporating it into their own. A papal dispensation was obtained due to a second-degree nature of the succession.

Together, they were the parents of:

- Charles de Crussol (1487–1546), who married Jeanne Ricard de Genouilhac.
- André de Crussol
- Marie de Crussol
- Marie de Crussol
- Madeleine de Crussol
- Jeanne de Crussol
- Anne de Crussol
- Jeanne La Jeune de Crussol

The 8th Viscount of Uzès died in 1525 and was succeeded by his son Charles.

== See also ==
- Lords, viscounts and dukes of Uzès
