= Jacques de Crussol, 2nd Duke of Uzès =

French military commander, peer and duke

Jacques de Crussol
- 2nd Duke of Uzès
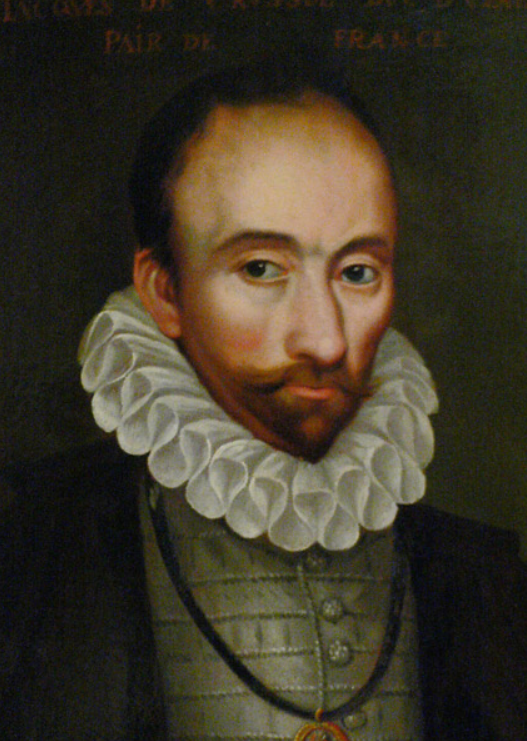
- Portrait of d'Acier wearing the mark of the Order of the Holy Spirit
- Other titles: Baron of Acier
- Born: 20 June 1540; Kingdom of France
- Died: 7 September 1586 (aged 46)
- Family: House of Crussol
- Spouse: Françoise de Clermont-Tonnerre
- Issue: Emmanuel I de Crussol
- Father: Charles de Crussol
- Mother: Jeanne de Genouilhac

Jacques de Crussol, 2nd Duke of Uzès (20 June 1540 – 7 September 1586) was a Protestant, then Catholic military commander and duke during the French Wars of Religion. Converting to Protestantism early due to the influence of his mother he would be acclaimed as defender of the Protestant church in Languedoc in early 1562. He would conduct a brutal campaign during the first civil war, capturing several towns and massacring their garrisons.

With peace declared d'Acier involved himself in the conspiracy of Meaux that attempted to seize the king and execute his leading militant Catholic advisers. While the attempt to capture the king would be a failure, d'Acier would see success in the south, securing Nîmes and Montpellier for the rebels. With the conclusion of the civil war in early 1568 he would remain in the field, being defeated by Guillaume de Joyeuse shortly thereafter. When formal civil war resumed later that year d'Acier assembled a large army of the southern Protestant leaders and moved to join with forces under Condé, despite one detachment being destroyed he was successful, and his forces held off the royal army after the defeat at the Battle of Jarnac. Wounded at Poitiers he was made colonel-general of the Protestant infantry, before being captured at the Battle of Moncontour

Released thanks to the efforts of his brother Crussol he would survive the Massacre of Saint Bartholomew through the protection of his wife and sister-in-law. With the death of Crussol during the siege of La Rochelle he converted to Catholicism and inherited his brothers peerage and duchy. His final elevation would come when he was among the first granted the new Order of the Holy Ghost by Henri III in 1580. He died in 1584.

== Early life and family ==
Jacques was the third son of Charles de Crussol and Jeanne Ricard de Genouillac. Though baptised a Catholic, Jacques mother ensured that he and his brother were raised in a Protestant household. From his mother he inherited the barony of d'Acier, after which he is known.

D'Acier married the sister of his brother's wife, Françoise de Clermont-Tonnerre. Like her husband she was a Huguenot and championed her religion at court. She outlived her husband, dying in 1608. Together they had the following issue:

1. Emmanuel I de Crussol
2. Louise de Crussol, married the Baron of Rieux in 1590
3. Marie de Crussol, married the Count of Rochefort in 1590
4. Diane de Crussol, married the Baron of Tor in 1594
5. Elisabeth de Crussol
6. Diane de Crussol.

== Reign of Charles IX ==
=== First civil war ===
Early in 1562 while his brother was working to ensure the south of France complied with the king's edicts, d'Acier accepted an offer from the Protestant church of Languedoc to be its military protector. In the civil war that broke out shortly thereafter he led a campaign of terror in Languedoc, becoming renowned for his cruel conduct. As military commander for the rebels of the region he oversaw the capture of Béziers and Marseillan. His banner was emblazoned with a hydra representing Catholic cardinals being crushed by a Protestant Hercules. His success would not last however and he would be bested by Joyeuse. Stinging from the defeat he retreated to Montpellier Joyeuse attempted to besiege him however he prepared the city well, and was able to beat back his attempts, rebounding onto the offensive once more. He seized the town of Bourg-Saint-Andéol and massacred its garrison. In November 1562 his brother Crussol was persuaded to assume the role of governor of Languedoc by the Protestants, he quickly installed Beaudiné as the lieutenant-general of the region. D'Acier for his part was appointed lieutenant general and governor of Nîmes.

=== Surprise of Meaux ===
In the peace that followed the civil war order was returned to Languedoc. Damville installed Catholic town councils across the region as its governor, ignoring the vehement protests of Crussol and d'Acier. D'Acier was among the Protestant nobles who conspired to arrange the Surprise of Meaux with his role being to rise up in the south concurrently to the capture of the king and seize the towns of Languedoc.

=== Second civil war ===
He oversaw the razing of the Cathedral in his families home town of Uzès so that the materials might be used to make it more defensible. Then he travelled with his brother Beaudine to Nîmes, which had been seized in a coup shortly after Condé's attempt on the king, where he besieged the royal garrison that was holding out in the town and completed the coup. The brothers then travelled to Montpellier, where despite rigorous defence by Joyeuse they were able to capture the city, d'Acier deciding to leave d'Aubais in charge of the city as he continued campaigning.

=== Short peace ===
While the second civil war had formerly been brought to a close with the Peace of Longjumeau campaigning continued in the south of France. D'Acier and Montbrun were brought to battle by Sommerive and defeated near Montfrin. Safely in charge of Languedoc, Joyeuse re-instituted Catholicism in Uzès and other towns.

=== Third civil war ===
Arriving at La Rochelle following his flight from court in late 1568, Condé put out the call for Protestant forces to be assembled and come to his aid. D'Acier responded to the call, mustering an army of many of the southern captains at Alais, around 20,000 strong to come to the prince's aid. The crown was unable to prevent his forces achieving juncture with those of Condé on 1 November. However part of his army under Mouvans separated from the main host and was crushed by the duke of Montpensier.

The following year after the death of Condé at the Jarnac d'Acier's forces assisted in the withdrawal of the main body of the army under Coligny. During the siege of Poitiers d'Acier was badly wounded. Shortly thereafter upon the death of Andelot, d'Acier was elevated to his position of Colonel-General of the infantry in the rebel army. Fresh off his promotion he would fight with Coligny at the far more decisive engagement of the Battle of Moncontour where the rebel force was annihilated. Among the many leading Protestants captured, d'Acier was taken prisoner by the count Santa-Fiore. He was saved from reprisals for his military conduct by the intervention of his brother, who secured his release.

=== Inheritance and conversion ===
As the Massacre of Saint Bartholomew unfolded, d'Acier who had come to the capital for the wedding was protected by his wife and sister in law, both of whom were close to the court.

In 1573 his brother Crussol died from an illness developed during the siege of La Rochelle, leaving the title of duc d'Uzès vacant. D'Acier quickly converted to Catholicism so that he could take advantage of the inheritance, becoming the second duc d'Uzès and a peer of France. After the conclusion of the fourth civil war, d'Acier was charged in his role as Lieutenant-General of Languedoc to bring the Huguenots of the region back into obedience with the crown and the peace edict. He reported to the crown that there was a general dissatisfaction among the population with his attempts to administer justice.

== Reign of Henri III ==
=== Malcontents ===
Allegiances were no longer so clearly delineated on religious grounds by 1574. The Malcontents (France), consisting of moderate Catholic and Protestant nobles conspired against the crown, however their plot was uncovered and civil war resumed. Damville, governor of Languedoc raised an army against the crown. He was opposed in his efforts to control Languedoc by the lieutenant general d'Acier, who now fought loyally for the crown. The two sides fought a running campaign as they sought to achieve a decisive advantage, however neither commander was able to achieve a total victory.

=== Order of the Holy Spirit ===
Henri III seeking religious advantage, and conscious of the dilution of the Order of Saint-Michel established a new order, that of the Order of the Holy Spirit, d'Acier was among those who first received the privilege. In September 1586, d'Acier died.

== Sources ==
- Albiousse, Lionel (1887). Histoire des ducs d'Uzès, : suivie d'une notice sur leur château ducal. H Champion.
- Baird, Henry (1880). History of the Rise of the Huguenots in Two Volumes: Vol 2 of 2. Hodder & Stoughton.
- Harding, Robert (1978). Anatomy of a Power Elite: the Provincial Governors in Early Modern France. Yale University Press.
- Roberts, Penny (2013). Peace and Authority during the French Religious Wars c.1560-1600. Palgrave Macmillan.
- Roelker, Nancy (1968). Queen of Navarre: Jeanne d'Albret 1528-1572. Harvard University Press.
- Salmon, J.H.M (1975). Society in Crisis: France during the Sixteenth Century. Metheun & Co.

French nobility
Preceded by Antoine de Crussol	Duke of Uzès; 1573–1586	Succeeded by Emmanuel de Crussol
