= Robert I of Uzès =

French nobleman

Robert I (? – after 1349) was a medieval French nobleman. For his services in the War of the Succession of Flanders and Hainault, Philip VI of France promoted the barony of Uzès into a viscountcy in 1328.

He married Guiote de Posquières, daughter of Raymond-Decan de Posquières, lord of Bellegarde, and of Simone de Caylar (or Cailar). Guiote brought in dowry to his husband lands of Bellegarde she inherited through her father.
