= Antoine de Crussol, 1st Duke of Uzès =

Antoine de Crussol
- 1st Duke of Uzès
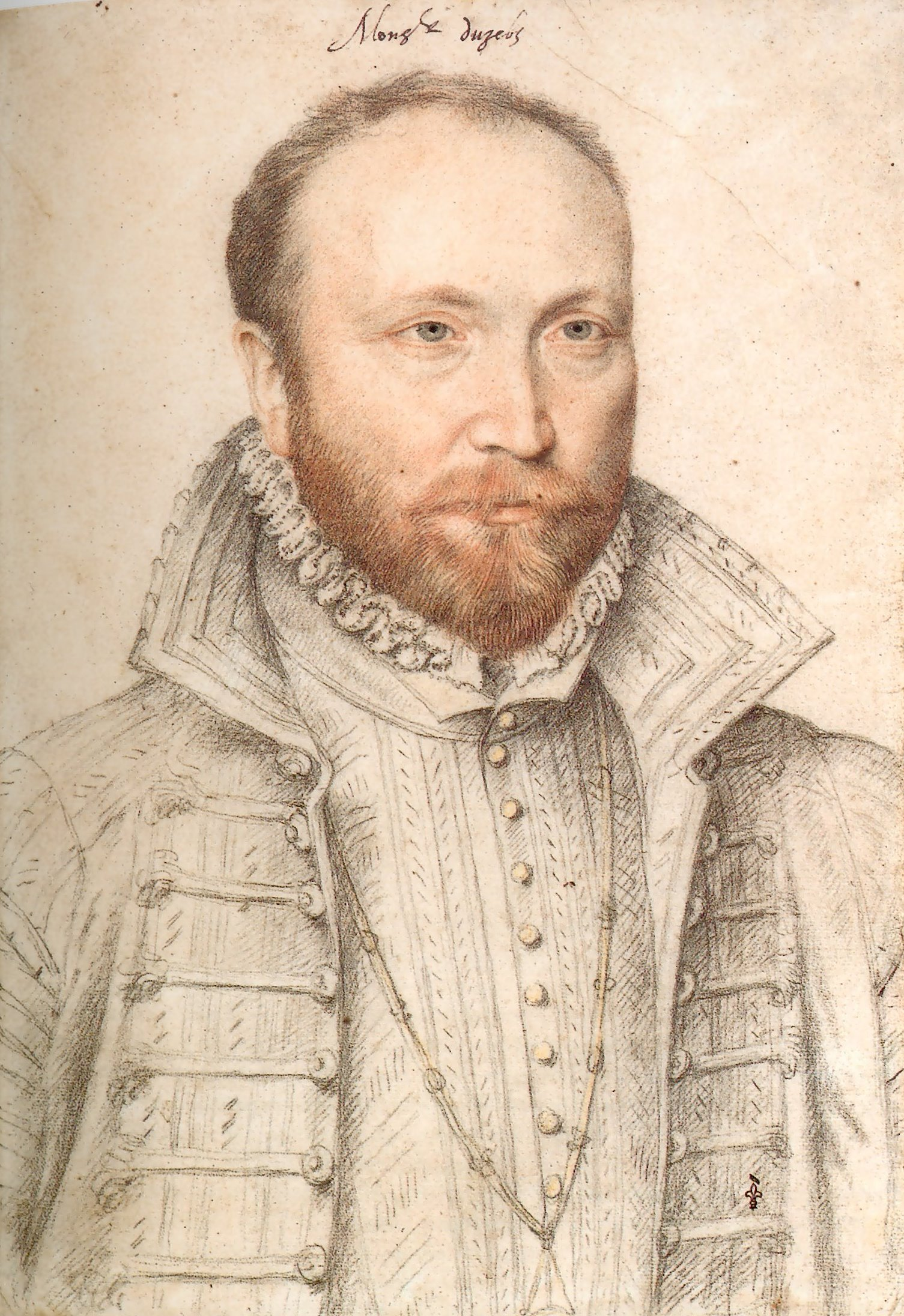
- Antoine de Crussol by François Clouet, in the Museé Condé
- Born: 21 June 1528; Kingdom of France
- Died: 11 August 1573 (aged 45)
- Family: Crussol
- Spouse: Louise de Clermont
- Father: Charles de Crussol
- Mother: Jeanne de Genouilhac

Antoine de Crussol, 1st Duke of Uzès (21 June 1528 – 14 August 1573), 10th Viscount of Uzès from 1546 until 1565, was a French Protestant military commander and peer. Raised in a Protestant household, Crussol was an early convert among the elite of France. In 1558 upon his marriage, his barony was elevated to a county by king Henri II. In the troubles that spread through the south in the wake of the Conspiracy of Amboise he was appointed as 'lieutenant and commander' to help bring order back to Provence and Languedoc. In this role he favoured the Protestants, much to the irritation of the Catholic consuls. When the French Wars of Religion broke out, he entered rebellion, accepting the nomination of Governor of Languedoc from the estates of the region. He appointed his relatives to senior positions in his administration.

With peace declared in the Edict of Amboise, Crussol did not immediately relinquish power in Languedoc, and held on to his forces until August. Having finally returned to loyalty to the crown he accommodated the court during the grand tour of France in 1564–5, following them on their journey through the south. In 1565 the crown raised his lands to a duchy, making him the duc d'Uzès Over the following years he ensured Catholic worship was restored in Nîmes. In 1571 his duchy was elevated into the peerage. During the Massacre of Saint Bartholomew he converted to Catholicism, and took part in the royal campaign against La Rochelle the following year. During the course of the siege he became ill, and he died on 11 August 1573 without issue.

== Early life and family ==
Crussol was born on 21 June 1528. His father was Charles de Crussol (1487–1546), 9th Viscount of Uzès (eldest son of Jacques de Crussol, 8th Viscount of Uzès) and his mother was Jeanne Ricard de Genouillac. Antoine and Jacques de Crussol were raised in a Protestant household directed by their mother.

Crussol married Louise de Clermont on 10 April 1556, a confident of Catherine de' Medici who acted as an intermediary between the court and Protestant nobles.On the occasion of their marriage, king Henri II raised Crussol into a county from a barony.

His brother d'Acier commanded Protestant forces in Languedoc during the first war of religion. He became renowned for his cruelties and was only spared reprisals by the intervention of his brother after he was captured in 1568. When Crussol died in 1573, d'Acier converted to Catholicism so that he might inherit the title of Uzès.

== Reign of Francis II ==
With Navarre and Condé holding up in the south away from court after the Conspiracy of Amboise, the king, confident of their guilt sent Crussol to bring them up to court such that they might face charges.

== Reign of Charles IX ==
=== New regime ===
Upon the ascent of Charles IX, Crussol was elevated to the Order of Saint Michael and granted a place on the conseil privé. At the regional Languedoc estates that proceeded the estates general in March 1561, a Huguenot delegate called for the confiscation of all clerical property and using the proceeds from selling it to maintain a reformed clergy. Crussol was among those nobles who supported this proposal alongside much of the rest of the nobility of Languedoc. In August at Pontoise a modified version of this proposal was endorsed by the general second and third estates.

=== Commissioner ===
With word reaching the court of the violent disorder in Provence Crussol was dispatched as a commissioner to work with the governor Tende in suppressing the local civil war that was developing between Catholic militants under Carcès and Protestant under Montbrun. The municipal consuls of Aix protested Crussol's selection as commissioner, arguing his Protestantism made him too biased to conduct the role, in response to this the more militant Catholics were ejected from the consulate of Aix and several nearby towns on royal orders. However his preference for Protestant allies in the province would manifest in the following months.

Reporting from the estates of Provence in April 1561 Crussol emphasised the great obedience and respect for the king his co-religionists held in Provence. In the same year Catherine oversaw his appointment as 'lieutenant and commander' of Languedoc. He quickly took advantage to assert his authority over the regions of the governorship where his estates were located in the east. Throughout the 1560s Crussol would outbid other buyers to snap up alienated church land when it became available in the diocese of Uzès, consolidating his holdings in the region.

=== First civil war ===
During the first civil war Crussol was tasked with pacifying Languedoc, however he seemed more interested in carving out a principality for himself. The Languedoc estates of November 1562 and March 1563 concerned themselves with building and financing a military defence system to be put under the command of Crussol. The estates of November met on Crussol's estates, arriving from Nîmes and after their deliberations he agreed to become the governor of Languedoc for the Protestant cause. He promised them he would tolerate no Catholics in his following and the estates gave him 400,000 livres. He proceeded to appoint subordinate governors to administer the province with the assistance of a small council. His brother Beaudiné was made lieutenant-general of Languedoc. Towns were compelled to sign oaths, on a similar line to the oaths Catholic Leagues extracted. With Condé captured on the field at the Battle of Dreux in December 1562, Catherine took the opportunity to chastise Crussol, urging him to 'remember his duties as the kings subject, and to get his fellow Protestants to disarm.

=== Edict of Amboise ===
In 1563 with peace declared in the Edict of Amboise, Provence successfully secured an exemption from the edicts terms. Marseille campaigned successfully against Crussol's provisions, arguing Protestantism had never been practiced in the city, so its introduction would be improper. Catherine protested the fact Crussol remained under arms, urging him to hand his troops over to Guillaume de Joyeuse. Crussol, who despised Joyeuse, abstained from handing over the territories under his control until August 1563. Crussol and his brother d'Acier protested as Damville the new governor of Languedoc began installing Catholic town councils in dozens of Protestant towns in the governorship. The central government sent two commissioners down to ensure elections for towns complied with the Edict of Amboise.

=== Royal tour ===
During the royal grand tour of 1564 the king, his mother and many notables spent time at Crussol's residence on their journey, before he accompanied them on in their journey to Nîmes. When the king reached Montpellier, he held council to discuss religious matters, among those sitting on the council was Crussol. In May 1565, while the king held a lit de justice in Toulouse, he elevated Crussol to the duc d'Uzes, though on the condition that if there was no male heir the duchy would pass to the crown.

=== Loyalist ===
Crussol rarely visited his holdings in the following years, consumed as he was in efforts at court, and with restoring Catholic worship in Nîmes. In 1566 he wrote to the king of his success in reinstalling the bishop of the city. In January 1571, the duchy of Uzès was further elevated into a peerage of the realm.

With the shockwaves that rippled out from the Massacre of Saint Bartholomew he converted to Catholicism. In the wake of the massacre, La Rochelle entered rebellion against the crown. Crussol aided the crown in their efforts to subdue the city, however, in the poor conditions of the siege lines he developed an illness, and he died on 11 August 1573. Having no children, he was succeeded to his titles by his brother d'Acier.

== Sources ==
- Albiousse, Lionel (1887). Histoire des ducs d'Uzès, : suivie d'une notice sur leur château ducal. H Champion.
- Benedict, Phillip (1999). Reformation, Revolt and Civil War in France and the Netherlands 1555-1585. Royal Netherlands Academy of Arts and Sciences.
- Harding, Robert (1978). Anatomy of a Power Elite: the Provincial Governors in Early Modern France. Yale University Press.
- Knecht, Robert (2010). The French Wars of Religion, 1559-1598. Routledge.
- Roberts, Penny (2013). Peace and Authority during the French Religious Wars c.1560-1600. Palgrave Macmillan.
- Roelker, Nancy (1968). Queen of Navarre: Jeanne d'Albret 1528-1572. Harvard University Press.
- Salmon, J.H.M (1975). Society in Crisis: France during the Sixteenth Century. Metheun & Co.

French nobility
Preceded by Charles de Crussol	Viscount of Uzès; 1546–1573	Succeeded by Jacques II de Crussol
New creation	Duke of Uzès; 1565–1573	Succeeded by Jacques II de Crussol
