= Château d'Uzès =

Castle in Occitanie, France

Coordinates: 44.0130°N 4.4198°E

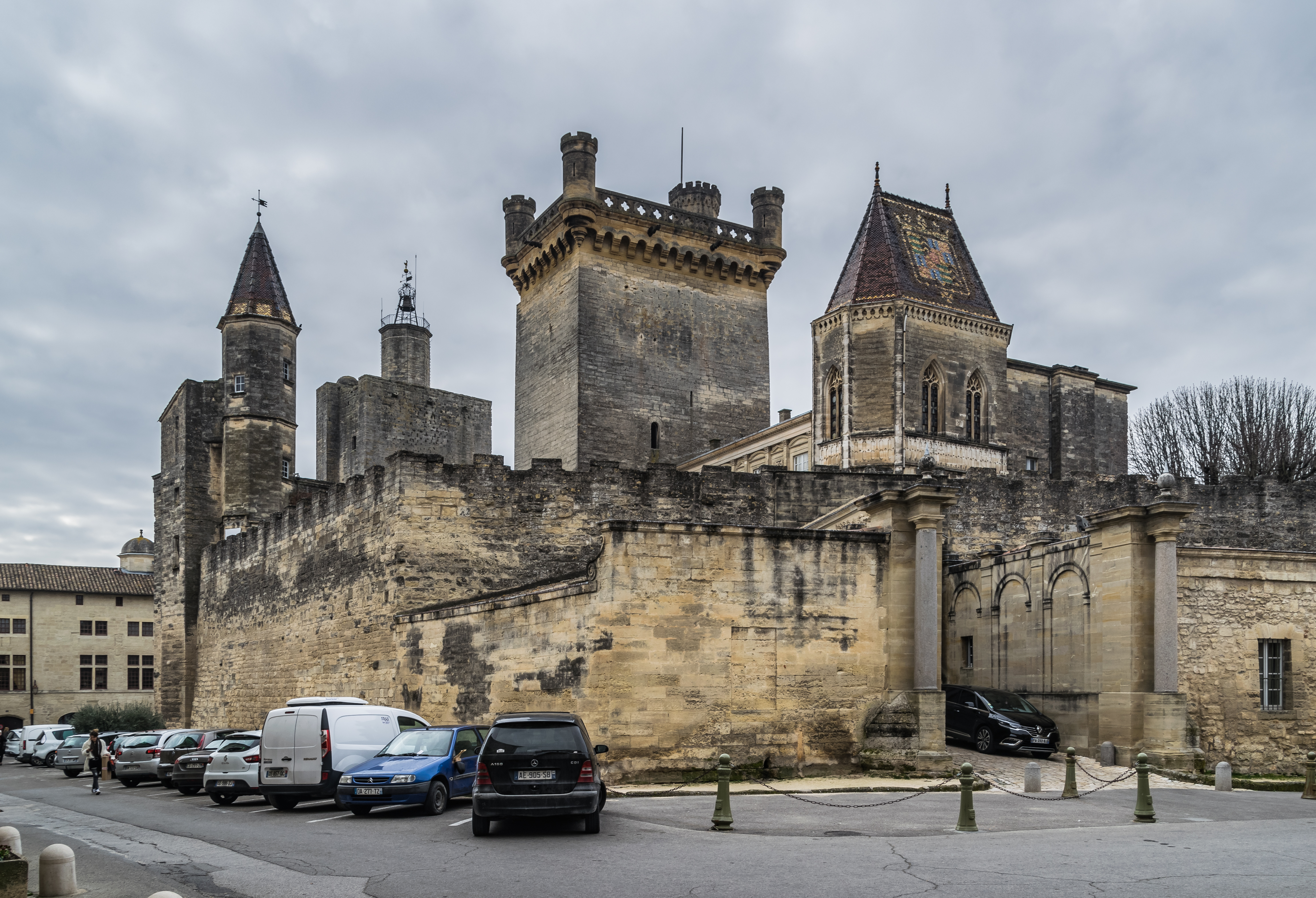
The Château d'Uzès

The Château d'Uzès (or the Duchy) is an 11th-century fortified castle in the medieval town of Uzès in the Gard department of Occitanie, France. It has been listed as a monument historique since 1934, and partially classified since 1889.

== History ==
A first Roman camp-castrum was founded on the highest point of Uzès (Ucetia), between Languedoc and Provence, at the time of Roman Gaul, and the Gallic people Volques Arécomiques.

=== Lordship of Uzès ===
The lordship of Uzès was founded in the 11th century, at the beginning of feudalism, by Elzéart d'Uzès, 1st Lord of Uzès. The fortified town and its fortified castle were then built (then remodeled over time) on the site of the previous castrum, with its ramparts, its corner towers, its 42 -metre keep, built by Bermond I of Uzès in the 12th century, its lordly dwelling (with a 16th-century Renaissance façade), its thousand-year-old cellars, and its flamboyant Gothic castle chapel from the 16th century (with a roof in glazed Burgundy tiles with the coat of arms of Antoine de Crussol,the 1st Duke of Uzès, from the 16th century, of the House of Crussol.

=== Duchy of Uzès ===
The Bishop of Uzès, Jehan II de Saint-Gelais, converted the powerful Diocese of Uzès to Protestantism in 1566. The city, largely Protestant, then took sides with the Reformation, and was greatly affected by the Wars of Religion.

While the Protestant Viscount of Uzès Antoine de Crussol (of the House of Crussol) worked to try to reconcile Catholics and Protestants in the south of France, King Charles IX established Uzès as a duchy in 1565 and named him 1st Duke of Uzès, then Duke and peer of France in February 1572 (in the Peerage of France), before the St. Bartholomew's Day massacre of 24 August in Paris, and the Duke's conversion to Catholicism.

The castle was sold as national property during the French Revolution and transformed into a college. The 10th Duke of Uzès, Marie François Emmanuel de Crussol, bought the castle back during the Second Restoration in 1824, before it became a college again following the financial difficulties of his successors. In 1951, the Marquise de Crussol launched major restoration work on the castle. In 1957, she bought it from her nephew Emmanuel de Crussol, 15th Duke of Uzès. In the early 1960s, she intervened with André Malraux, the Minister of Cultural Affairs. The Malraux law of 1962 allowed a protected sector to be created in Uzès in 1965.

=== Present day ===
The castle is currently open to visitors, owned by Jacques-Emmanuel de Crussol d'Uzès, the 17th Duke. It is listed with the medieval city of Uzès: a protected area since 1978, and a town of art and history since 2008.

== Other towers of Uzès ==
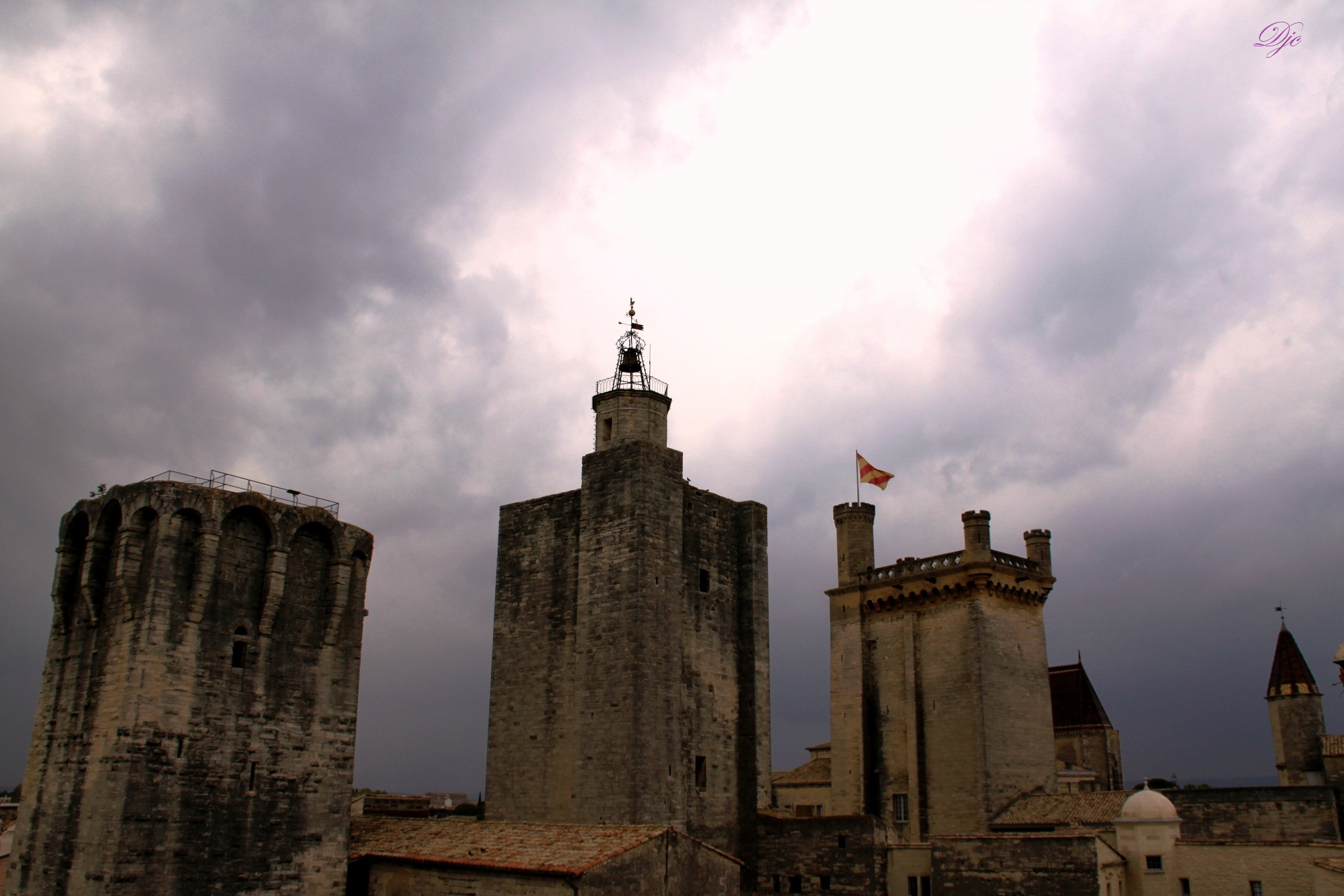
Alignment of the three towers-dungeons of the King, the Bishop, and the Duchy

The alignment of the three towers-dungeons of Uzès symbolizes the three forms of royal, episcopal, and ducal powers of the Middle Ages, with:

- The King's Tower (or the Prison Tower) and its machicolations, symbols of the monarchy, and its medieval garden at the foot of the tower.
- The Bishop's tower (or Clock tower) topped with a bell tower, of the Bishops of Uzès (Diocese of Uzès)
- The Duchy tower: the 42 m keep from the 12th century, of the Uzès fortified castle
- The 12th century 42 meter Fenestrelle tower of the 11th century Uzès Cathedral, 4th towers of Uzès.

== Gallery ==
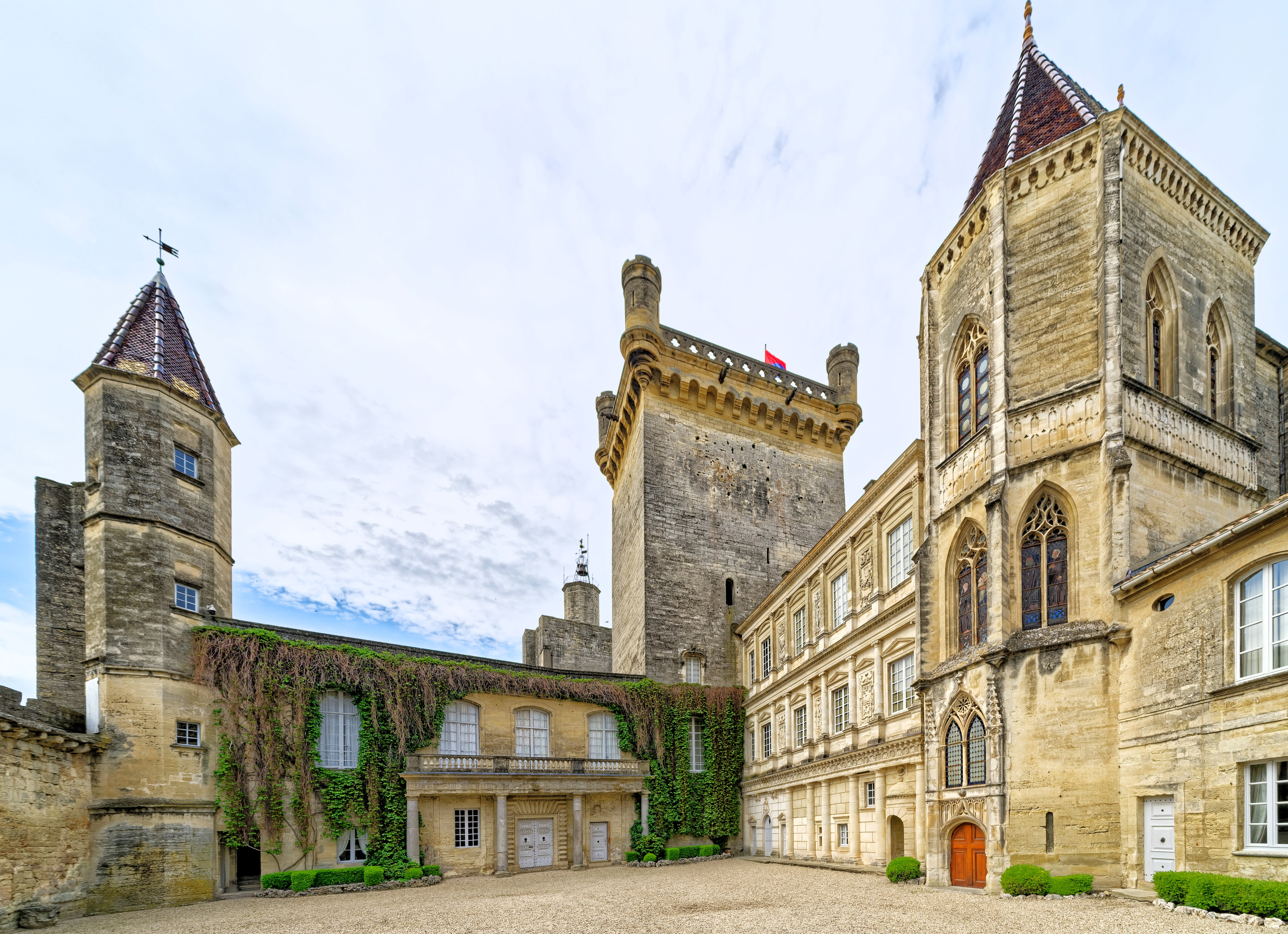

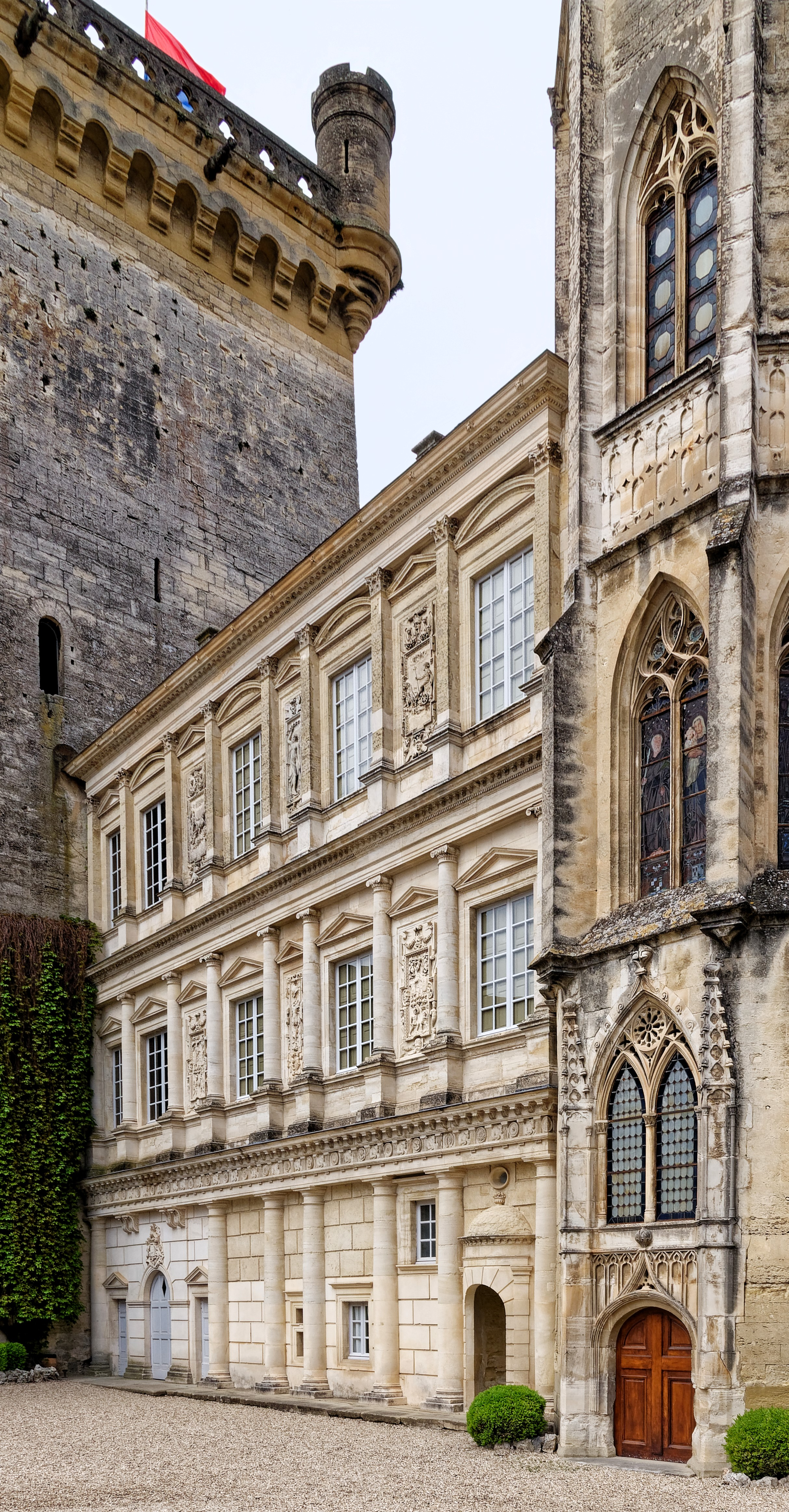

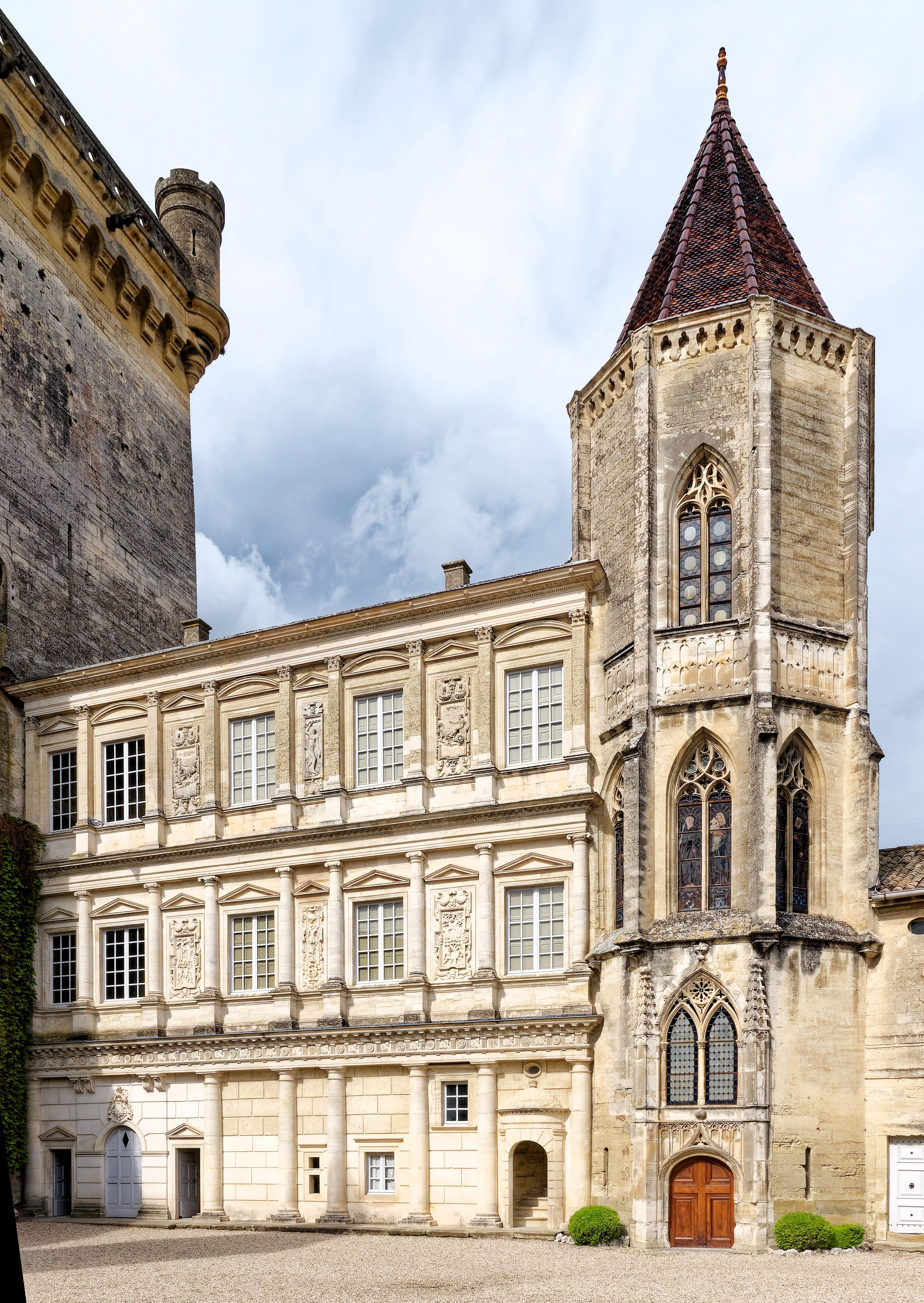

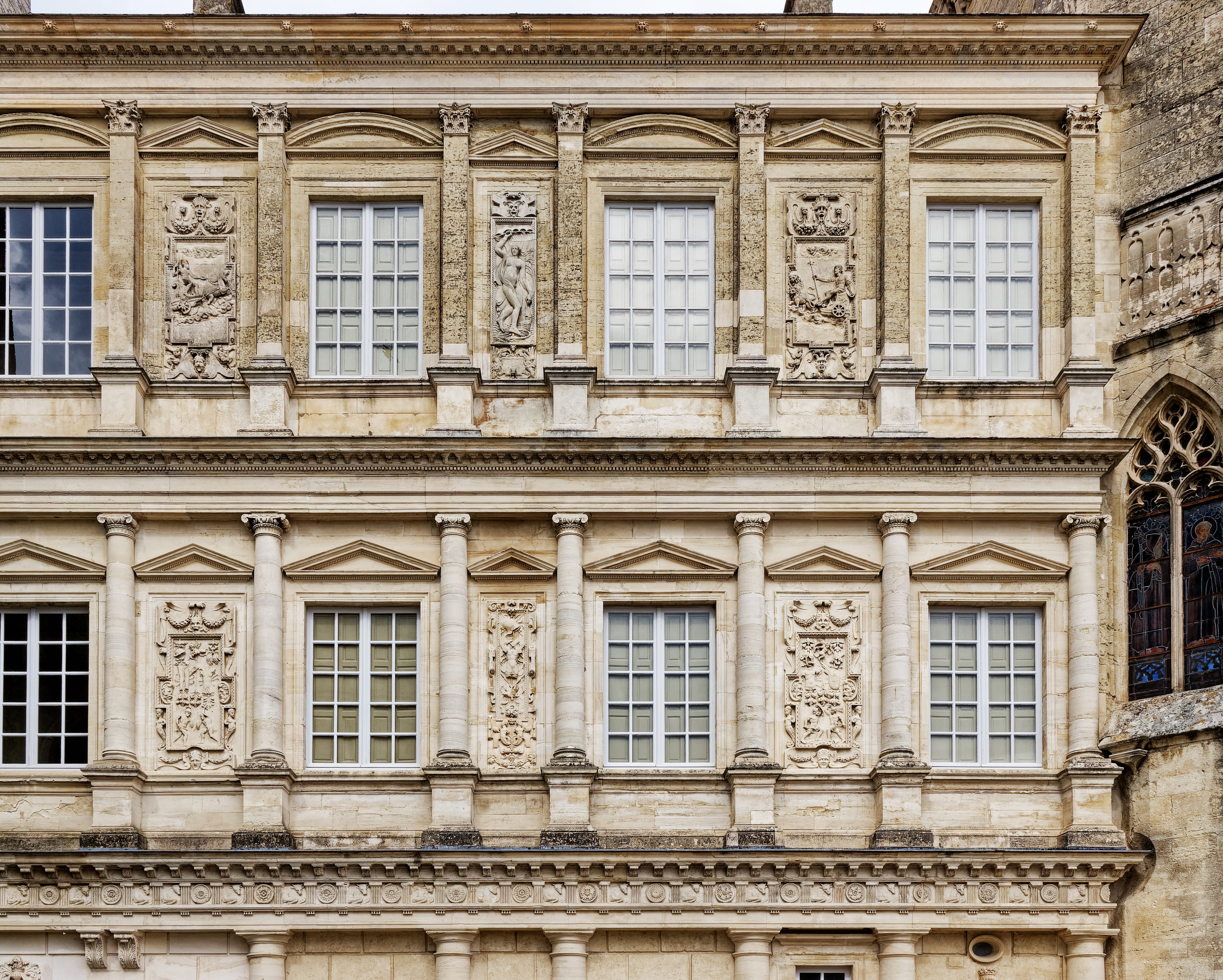

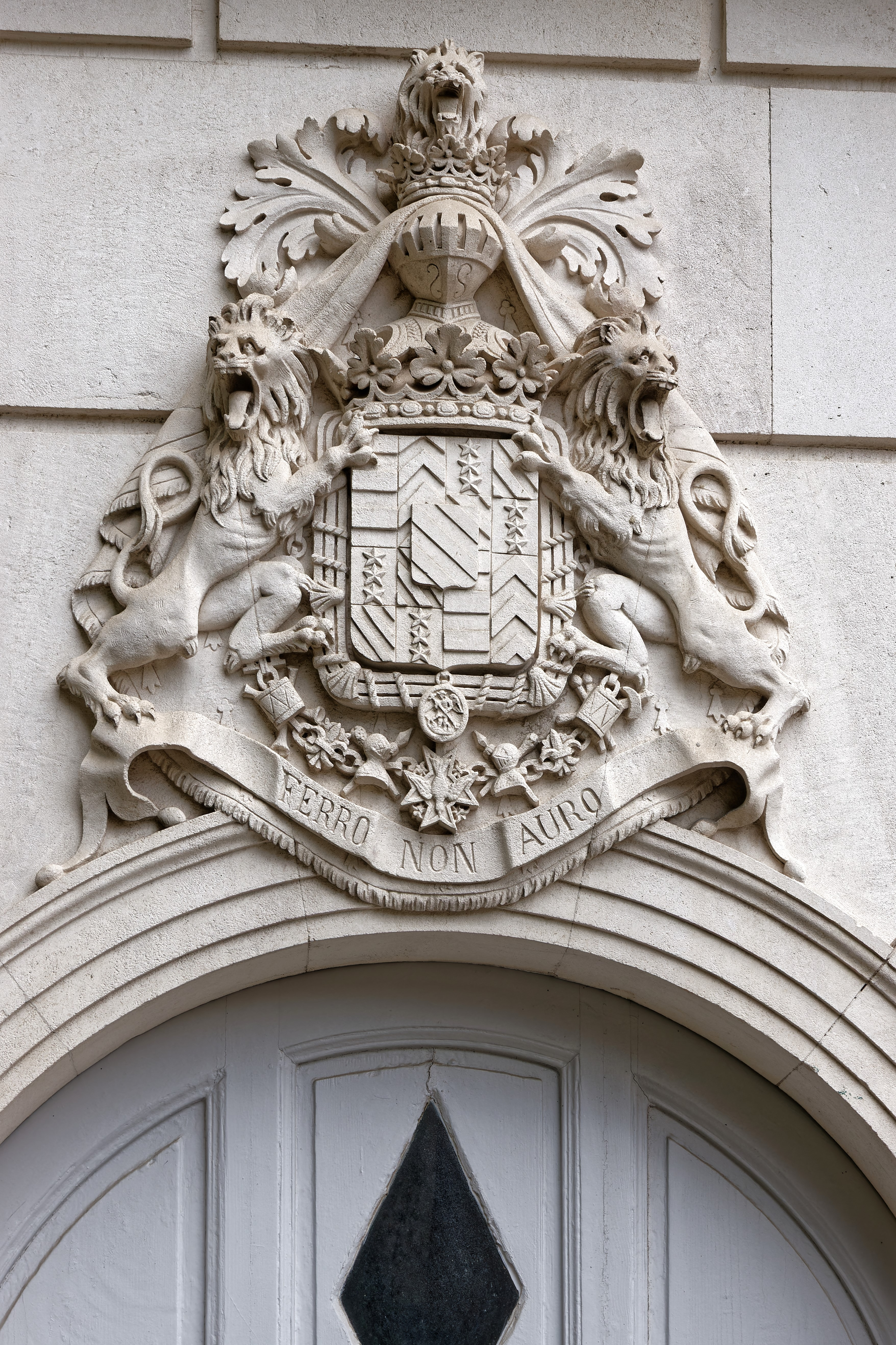
