= Florensac =

- Commune
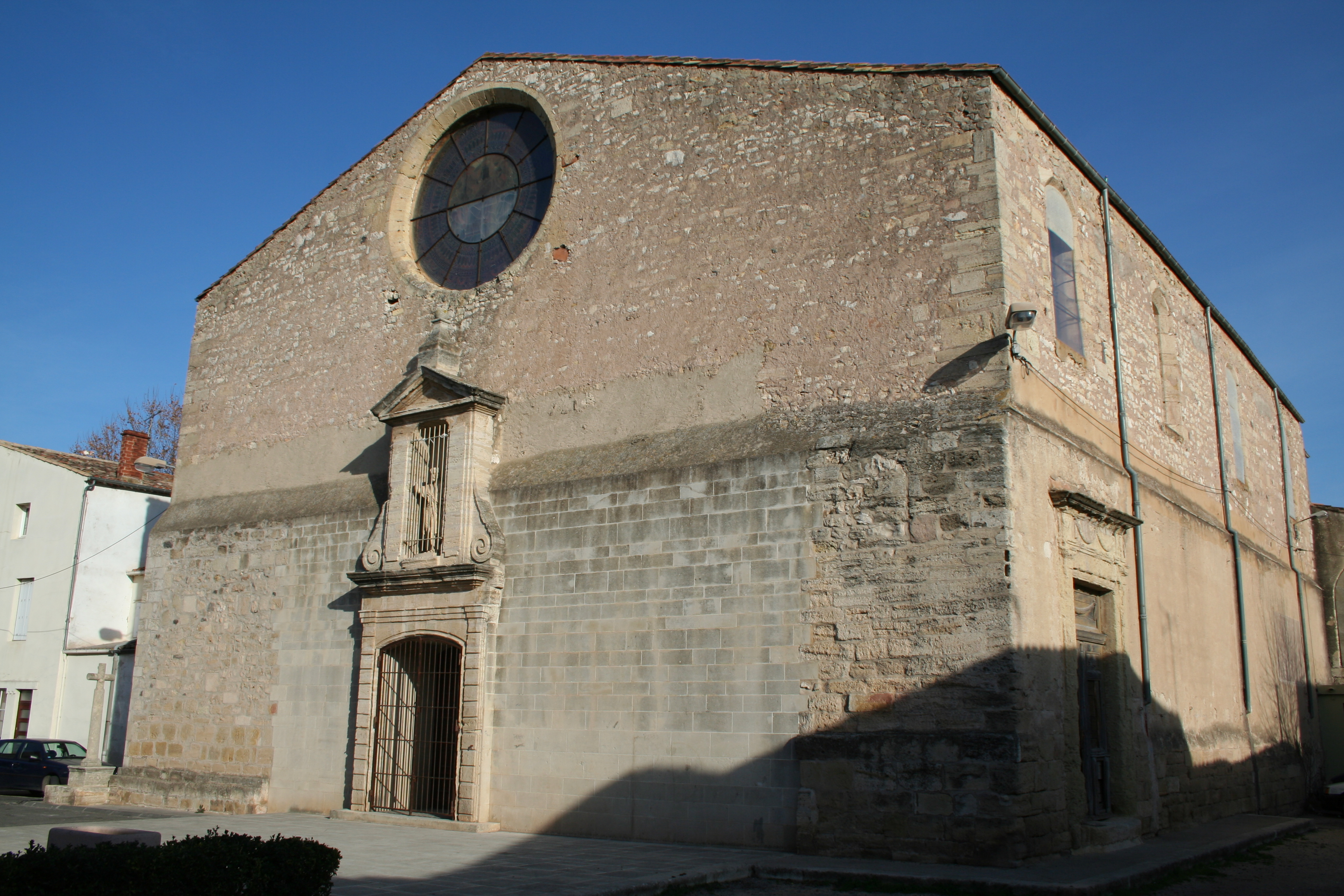
- The church of St-Jean-Baptiste

- Coat of arms
- Location of Florensac
- Location within France Location within Occitanie
- Coordinates: 43°23′01″N 3°27′56″E
- Country: France
- Region: Occitania
- Department: Hérault
- Arrondissement: Béziers
- Canton: Pézenas
- Intercommunality: CA Hérault Méditerranée

Government
  - Mayor (2020–2026): Vincent Gaudy
- Area^{1}: 36.9 km^{2} (14.2 sq mi)
- Elevation: 9 m (30 ft)
- Highest elevation: 90 m (300 ft)
- Lowest elevation: 1 m (3.3 ft)
- Population (2023): 5,254
  - Density: 142/km^{2} (369/sq mi)
- Time zone: UTC+01:00 (CET)
  - Summer (DST): UTC+02:00 (CEST)
- INSEE/Postal code: 34101 /34510
- ^{1} French Land Register data, which excludes lakes, ponds, glaciers > 1 km^{2} (0.386 sq mi or 247 acres) and river estuaries.

Florensac (French pronunciation: [flɔʁɑ̃sak]; Occitan: Florençac) is a commune in the Hérault department in southern France.

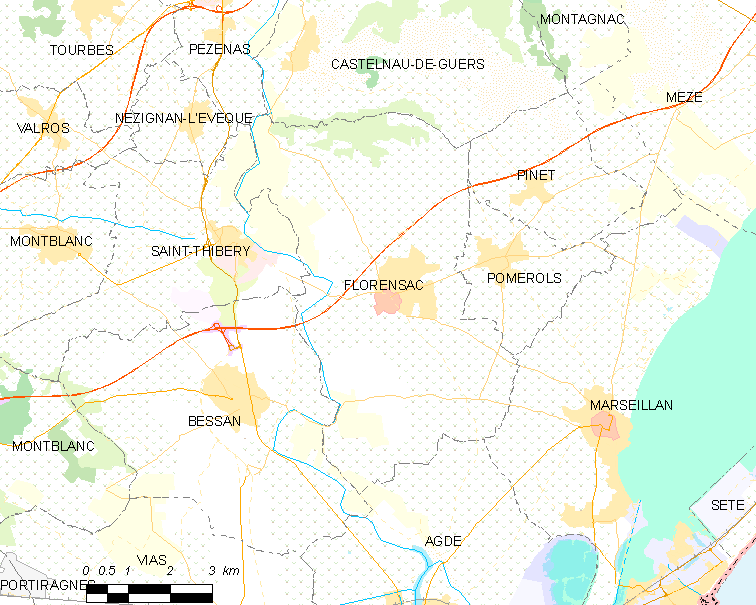
Map

== Population ==
Historical population
Year	Pop.	±% p.a.
1968	2,785	—
1975	2,917	+0.66%
1982	3,064	+0.70%
1990	3,583	+1.98%
1999	3,859	+0.83%
2007	4,639	+2.33%
2012	4,939	+1.26%
2017	5,014	+0.30%
2023	5,254	+0.78%
Source: INSEE

== Images ==
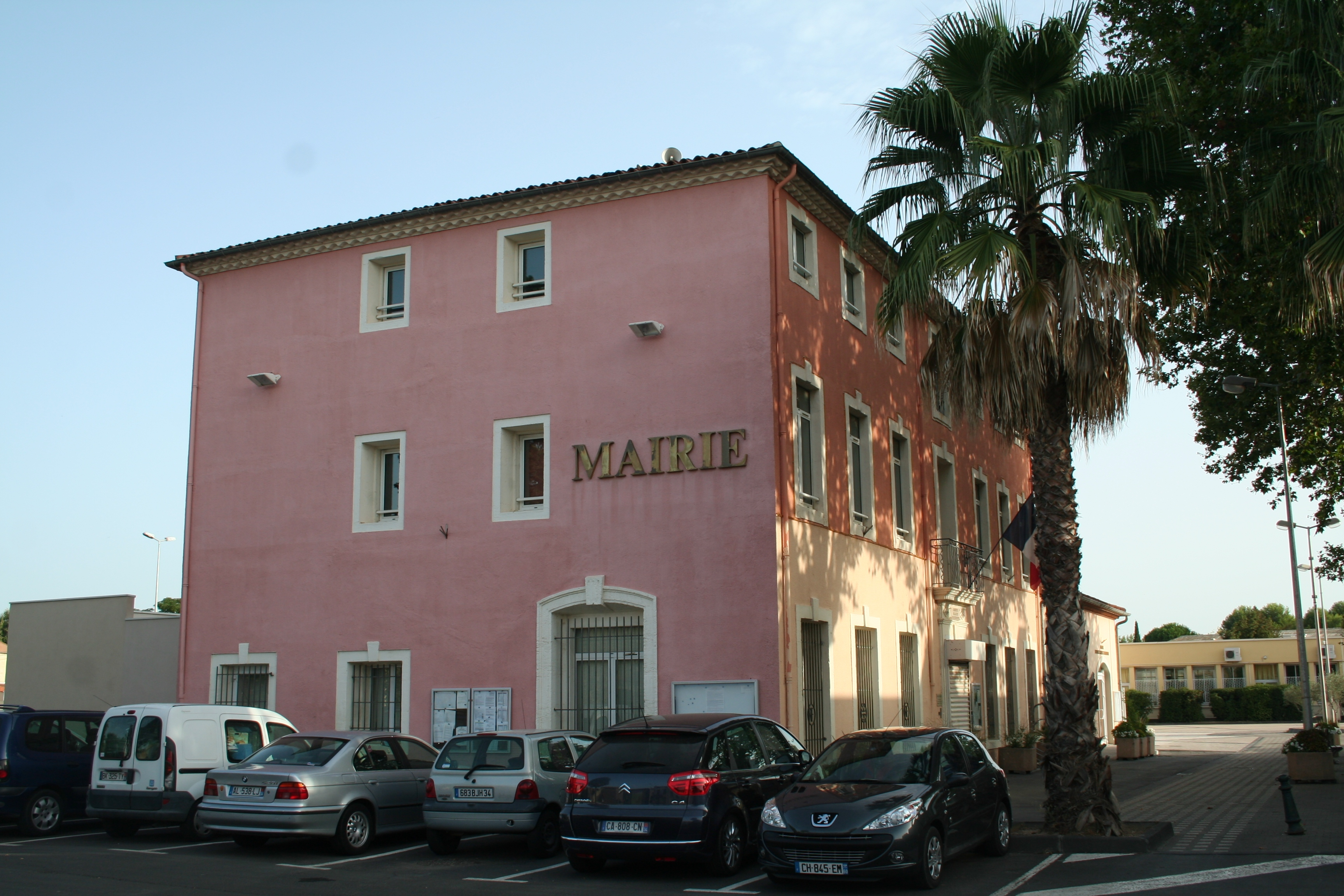
Town hall.

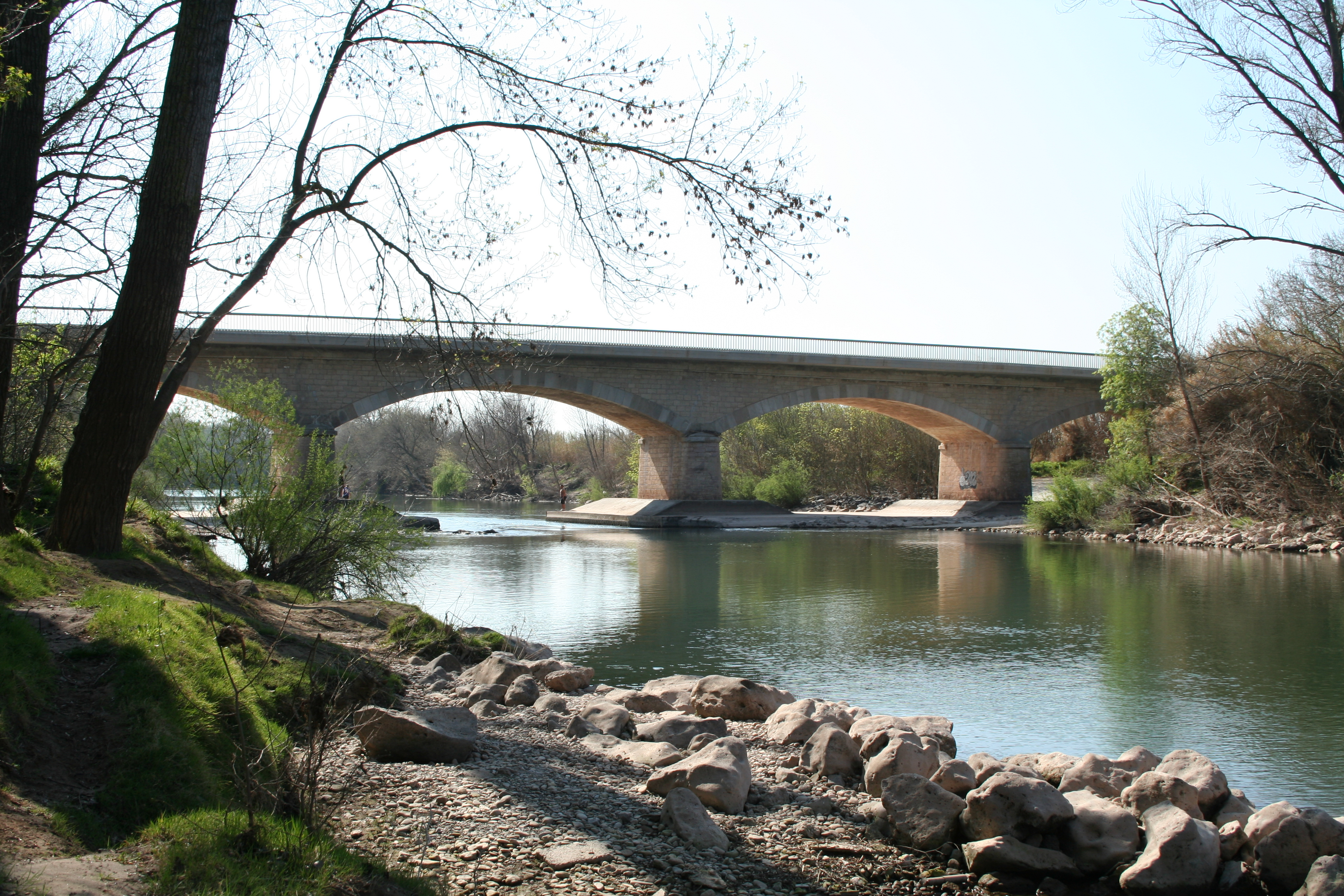
Bridge between Florensac and St. Thibéry.

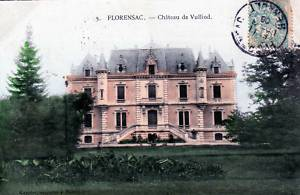
Florensac Castel build by baron Fernand de Vulliod.

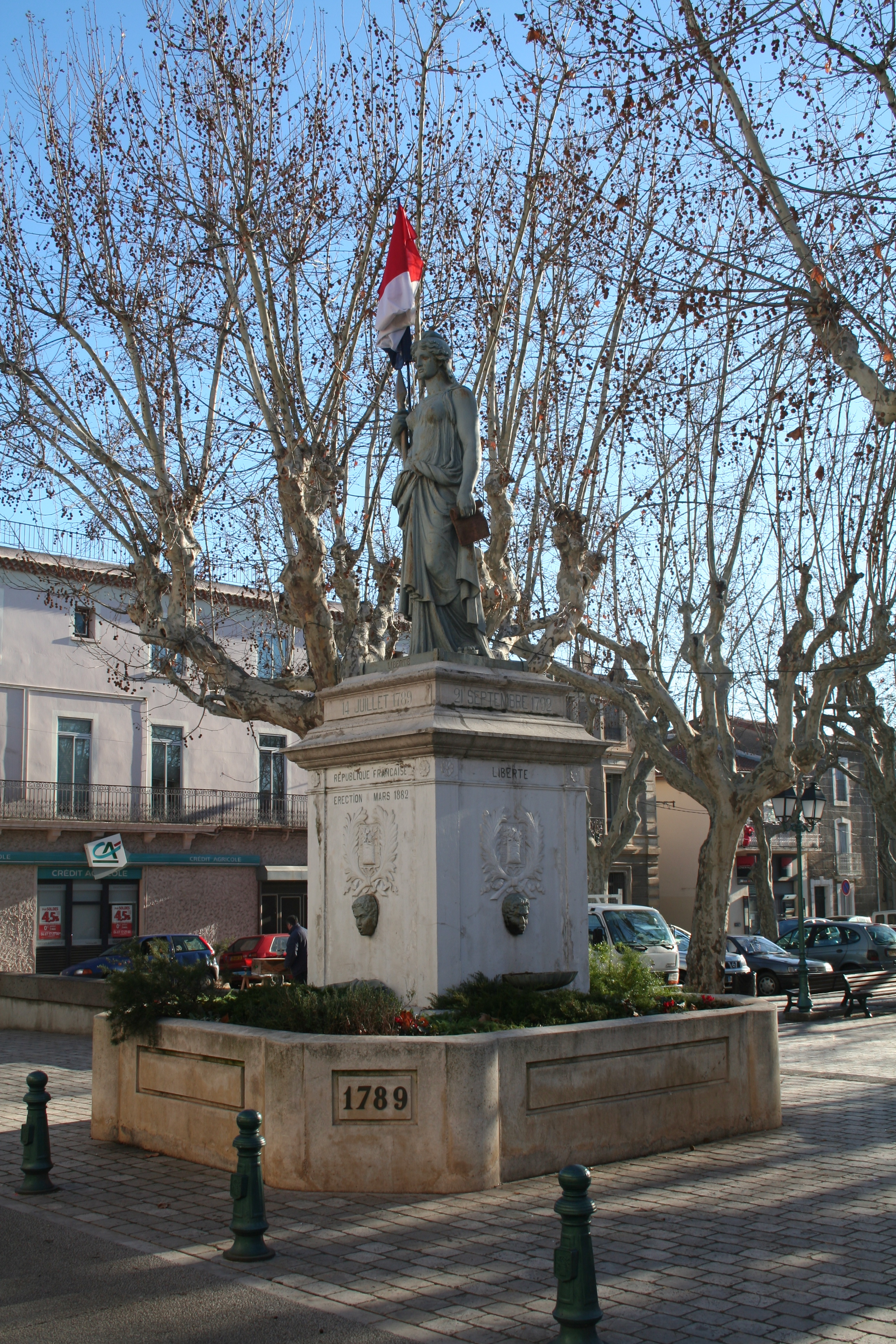
Statue of Marianne.

== See also ==
- Communes of the Hérault department
