= House of Crussol =

French noble family

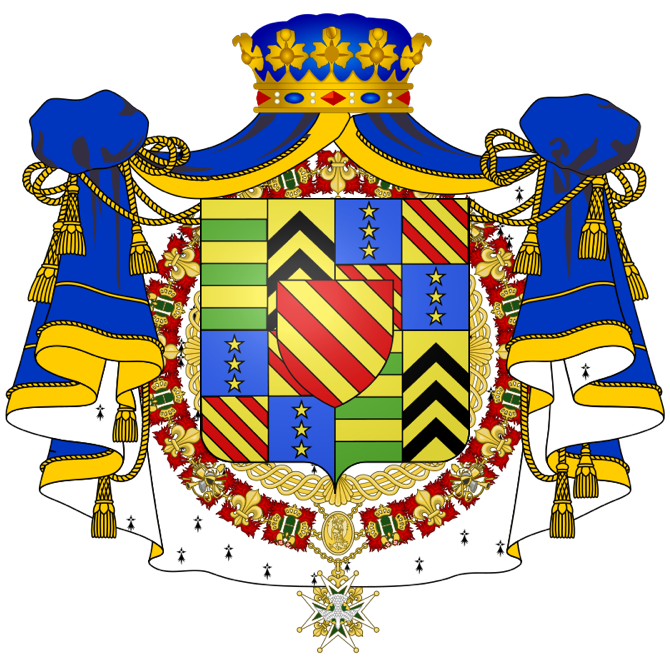
- Coat of arms
- Country: Kingdom of France
- Founded: High Middle Ages
- Founder: Gérald Bastet
- Current head: Jacques de Crussol d'Uzès, 17th Duke of Uzès
- Titles: Duke of Uzès; Duke of Crussol; Marquis of Crussol; Marquis of Saint-Sulpice; Marquis of Florensac; Marquis of Montsalès; Marquis of Cuisieux; Viscount of Uzès
- Estates: Château de Crussol; Château d'Uzès; Château de Bonnelles; Château de La Celle-lès-Bordes; Château de Maulnes; Hôtel d'Uzès (Paris); Hôtel d'Uzès (Tonnerre)

The House of Crussol (initially Bastet) is a surviving family of French nobility, with origins in Languedoc. Its members have included general officers, a governor, prelates, a woman of letters in the 18th century, and deputies in 1789 and the 19th century. The title of Duke of Uzès was granted in 1565 to Antoine de Crussol, 10th Viscount of Uzès, along with a French peerage in 1572.

== History ==
The Crussol family has proven its nobility since 1215 and was admitted to the honors of the Court in the 18th century.

Bastet was "a nickname taken by Gérald Bastet or Bastetz, lord of Crussol, of Cruszol, who lived in 1160". Crussol, from the name of a barony located in Vivarais near Valence, to end up completely substituting the name of Crussol for his original surname. Gérald Bastet was a nephew of Odon de Chaponay, Bishop of Valence.

The family was given the title of Duke of Uzès in 1565, and the peerage in 1572.

== Branches ==
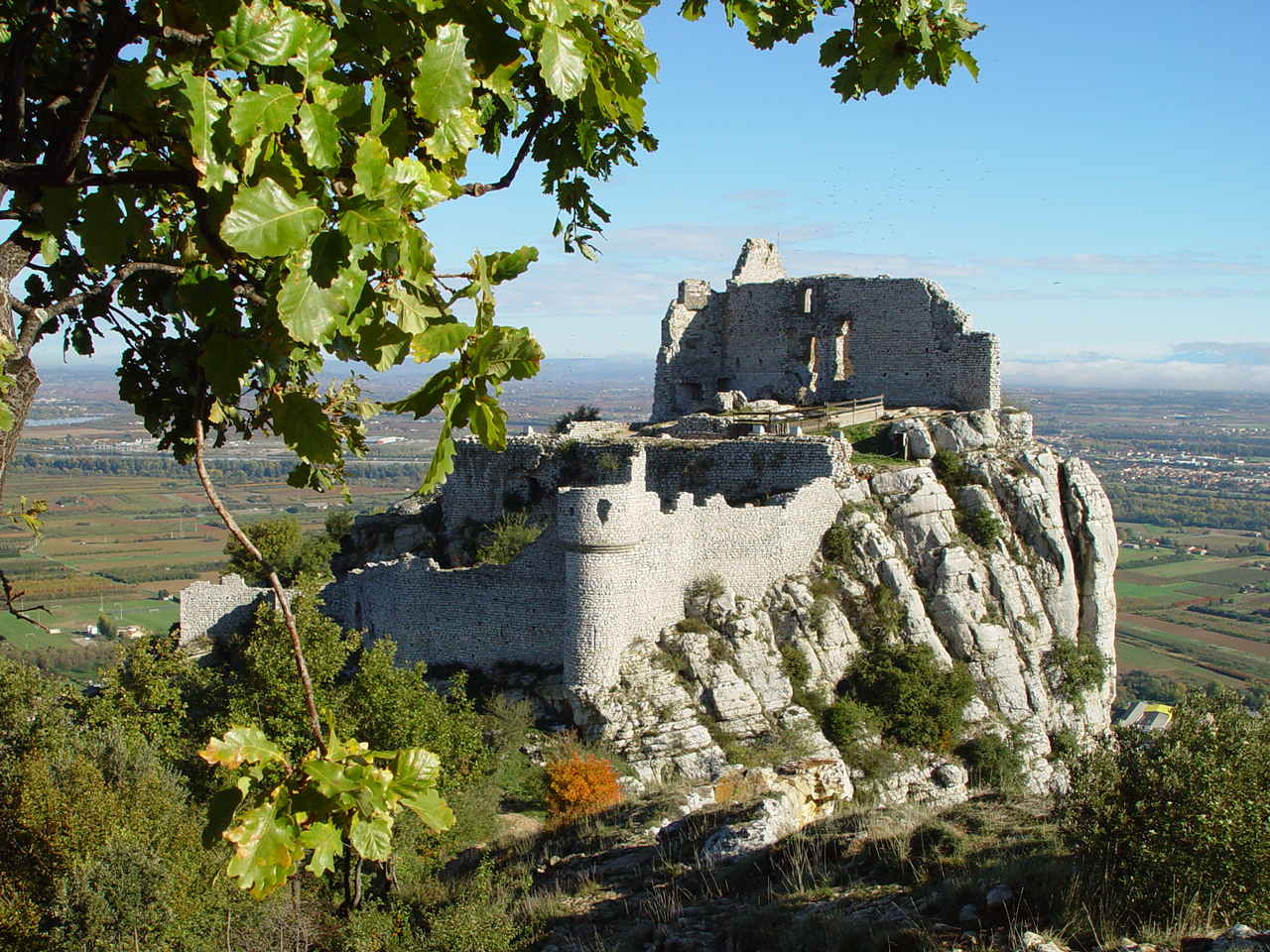
Château de Crussol

=== Viscounts of Uzès (1486), then Dukes of Uzès (1565) ===
- Jacques de Crussol (1460–1525), 8th Viscount of Uzès (by marriage).
- Charles de Crussol (1483–1546), 9th Viscount of Uzès.
- Antoine de Crussol, 1st Duke of Uzès (1528–1573), 1st Duke of Uzès, Peer of France, military leader.
- Jacques de Crussol, 2nd Duke of Uzès (1540–1586), 2nd Duke of Uzès, lieutenant general of Languedoc.
- Emmanuel de Crussol, 3rd Duke of Uzès (1570–1657), 3rd Duke of Uzès
- François de Crussol, 4th Duke of Uzès (1604–1680), 4th Duke of Uzès
- Emmanuel de Crussol, 5th Duke of Uzès (1642–1692), 5th Duke of Uzès
- François Charles de Crussol (1679–1736), styled Count of Uzès (younger son of the 5th Duke of Uzès), participant in the Battles of Fleurus, Steinkerque, Neerwinden of the Nine Years' War, then governor of Oléron and Landrecies.
- François de Crussol d'Uzès (1702–1758), sometimes called Crussol d'Uzès d'Amboise, Bishop of Blois, then Archbishop of Toulouse.
- François-Joseph-Emmanuel de Crussol d'Uzès (1735–1789), Bishop of La Rochelle.
- Marie-François-Emmanuel de Crussol (1756–1843), 10th Duke of Uzès, Lieutenant General and Peer of France in 1814.
- Adrien-François-Emmanuel de Crussol (1778–1837), styled Duke of Crussol, deputy, Peer of France.
- Géraud de Crussol, 11th Duke of Uzès (1808–1872), 11th Duke of Uzès, deputy.
- Emmanuel de Crussol, 12th Duke of Uzès (1840–1878), Duke of Uzès, deputy, husband of the famous and wealthy Anne de Rochechouart de Mortemart, heiress of Veuve Clicquot known by her title of Duchess of Uzès.

=== Marquesses of Saint-Sulpice ===
- Jacques Christophe de Crussol (c. 1608–1680), Marquis of Saint-Sulpice (second son of the 3rd Duke of Uzès)
- Emmanuel Charles de Crussol (c. 1638–1694), Marquis of Saint-Sulpice
- Philippe Emmanuel de Crussol (1685–1761), Marquis of Saint-Sulpice
- Alexandre Galliot de Crussol (c. 1650–1703), Marquis of Saint-Sulpice
- Jean Emmanuel de Crussol (1699–1735), Marquis of Amboise

=== Marquesses of Florensac ===
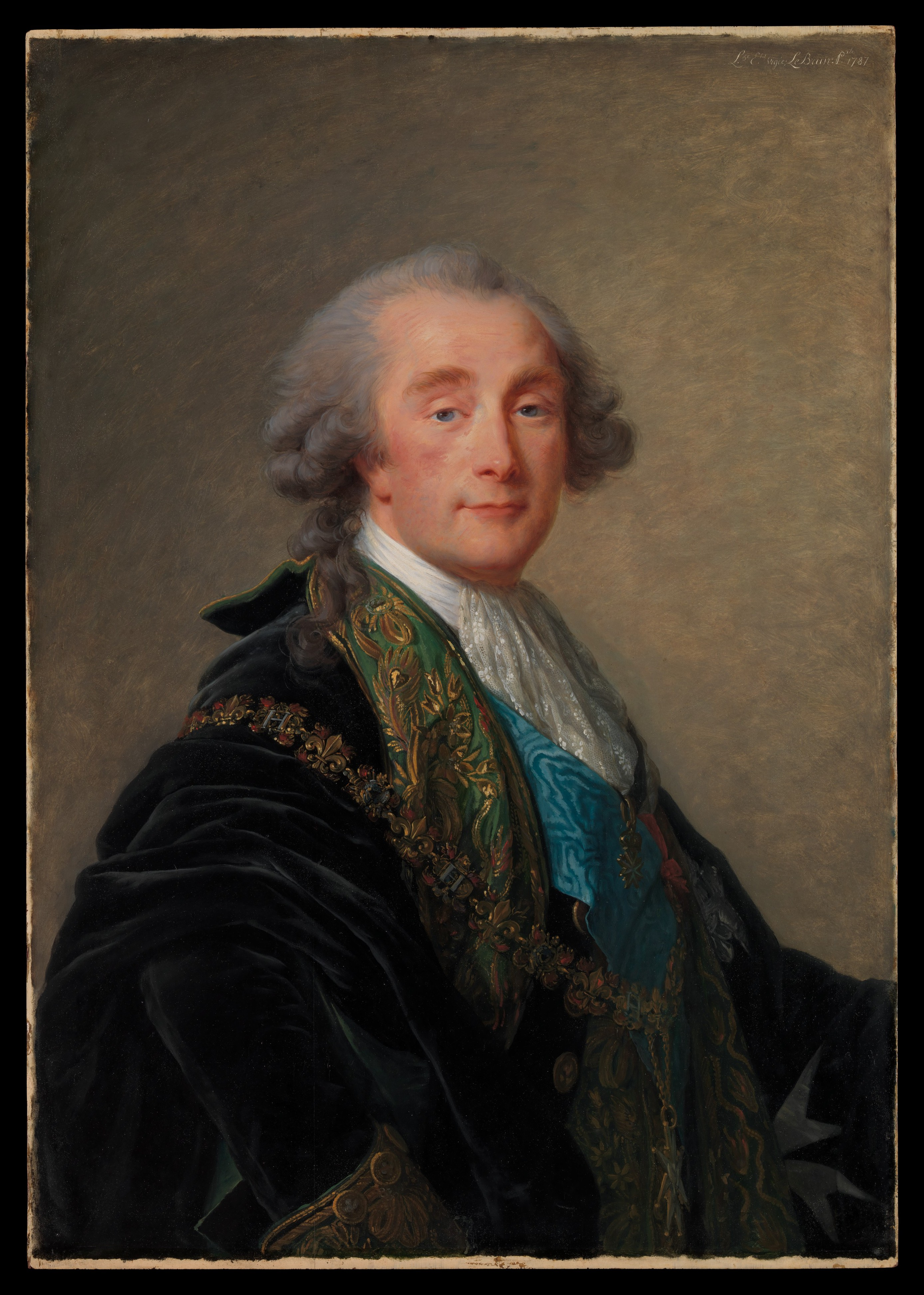
Portrait of Alexandre Charles Emmanuel de Crussol-Florensac (1743–1815), by Élisabeth Louise Vigée Le Brun, 1787

- Louis de Crussol (c. 1645–1716), Marquis of Florensac, maréchal de camp.
- Anne-Charlotte de Crussol de Florensac (1700–1772), Duchess of Aiguillon through her marriage to Armand-Louis de Vignerot du Plessis, 5th Duke of Aiguillon, woman of letters, friend of Montesquieu and philosophers.

=== Marquesses of Montsalès ===
- Alexandre Galliot de Crussol (c. 1615–1680), Marquis of Montsalés (younger son of the 3rd Duke of Uzès)
- Louis de Crussol (1653–1712), Marquis de Crussol
- Emmanuel de Crussol (c. 1656–1713), Marquis of Montsalés

=== Marquesses of Cuisieux ===
- Armand de Crussol (1634–1663), Marquis of Cuisieux (youngest son of the 3rd Duke of Uzès)
- François de Crussol (c. 1660–c. 1711), Marquis of Cuisieux

=== Other members ===
- Odon de Crussol, prelate and Bishop of Valence in the 12th century.
- Giraud Bastet de Crussol, prelate in the 15th century, Archbishop of Tours, then Bishop of Valence and Die (1468-1472) and Patriarch of Antioch, younger brother of Louis de Crussol.
- Alexandre-Charles-Emmanuel de Crussol (1743–1815), deputy to the Estates General of 1789.
- Emmanuel-Henri-Charles de Crussol (1741–1818), deputy to the Estates General of 1789.
- Anne Emmanuel François Georges de Crussol d'Uzès, Marquis of Amboise and Fors, Lieutenant General of the King's Armies, owner of fiefs in the parish of Fors, Seneschal of Niort. Deputy to the Estates General of 1789, executed on 26 July 1794 in Paris.
- Anne de Rochechouart de Mortemart (1847–1933), by marriage, the Duchess of Uzès, the most famous member of this family, emblematic of the French nobility under the Third Republic, died at the Château de Dampierre in 1933.
- Marie-Louise Béziers (1904–1991), by marriage, the Marquise de Crussol, known as "the Red Marquise", Parisian literary and political salonnière, restorer of the Château d’Uzès.
- Margaret de Crussol d'Uzès (née Margaret "Peggy" Bedford, formerly Bancroft and d'Arenberg) (1932–1977), American‐born oil heiress.

== Coat of arms ==
In 1486, Jacques de Crussol became Viscount of Uzès through his marriage to Simone d'Uzès, on condition that he bear the name and arms of Uzès.

Until 1486: gold and sinople bands (Crussol)

1486–1546: party 1st gold and sinople fess of six pieces (Crussol), 2nd gules with three gold bands (Uzès)

Since 1565: quartered, 1st and 4th, party Crussol, Lévis; 2nd and 3rd, counter-quartered Gourdon, Genouillac; Uzès on the whole

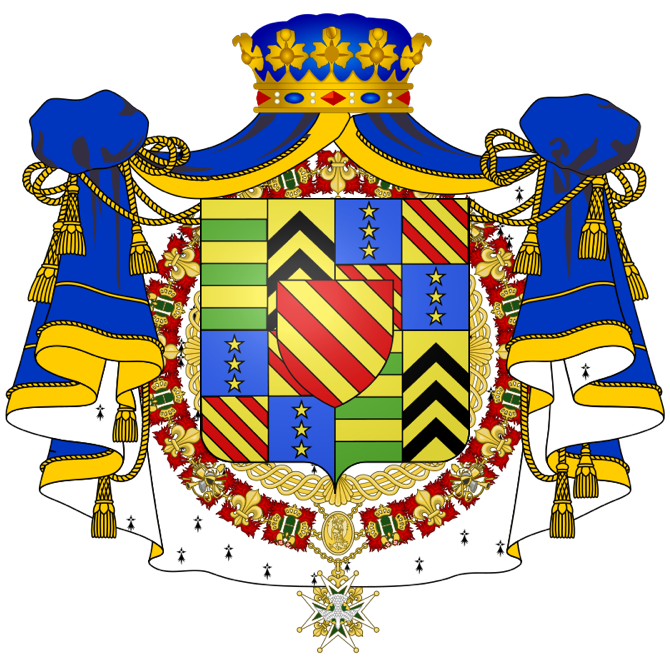
Arms of the Dukes of Uzès, with the blue mantle and bonnet of a peer, and the collars of the ordres du roi
