= Second French War of Religion in the provinces =

Provincial theatres of 1567–8 French civil war

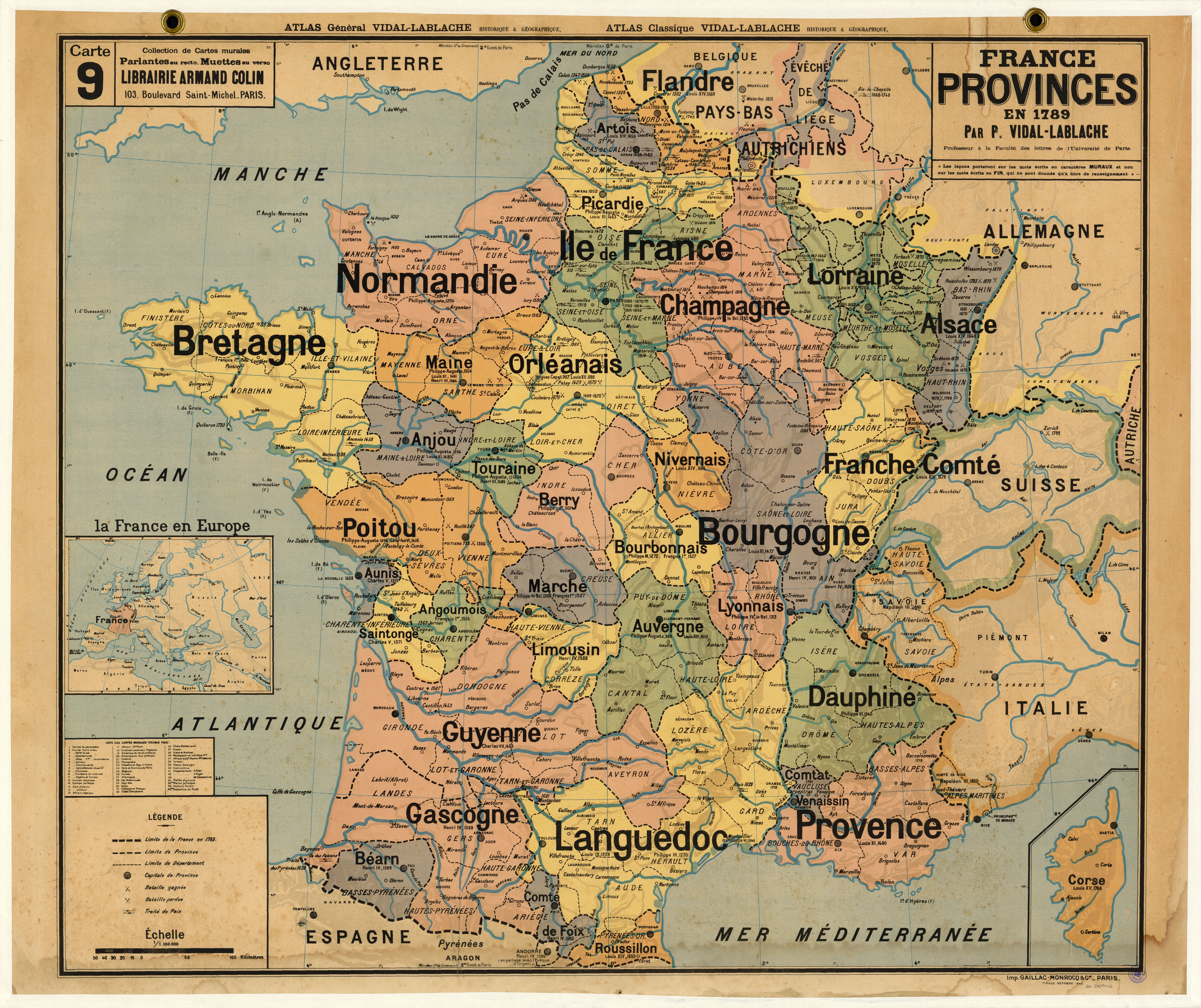
Provinces of France in 1789, the territories of Alsace, Lorraine, Artois, Flandre, Corse and the Franche-Comté were not part of France in 1567, the French territories of the Three Bishoprics lies within the province of Lorraine

The major cities seized by the Protestant rebels during the Second French War of Religion, excluding places captured by the main Protestant army

As they had during the first French War of Religion, Protestants would rise up across France in coordination with the surprise of Meaux, during which the prince de Condé and admiral de Coligny had attempted to kidnap king Charles IX of France. While Protestants would seize places across France, from Dieppe in Normandy to Montauban in the south of France, they had less uniform success than in the prior civil war. The large majority of places seized by the Protestants were in the south of France, in the provinces of Dauphiné, Languedoc, and Guyenne. Here, they were coordinated under the leadership of the baron d'Acier, who acted as Condé's lieutenant for Languedoc, Dauphiné and Provence.

Several Protestant armies marched north to join with the main rebel army which was fighting in the Orléanais, Île de France and Champagne at various points during the conflict. This included an army from Languedoc, and another from Guyenne. Royalist Catholic armies also operated in the provinces outside of the main royal army, such as the force of the duc de Nevers (duke of Nevers) which traced its way up from French Piedmont to join with the royal army, the army of the vicomte de Joyeuse (viscount of Joyeuse) which operated in Languedoc and the Comtat Venaissin, and the army of the seigneur de Monluc (lord of Monluc) which fought in Guyenne, Saintonge, the Angoumois, and Aunis.

In some places, particularly in the south, agreements were reached in the first days of the war between the Catholic and Protestant populations of the city in question, agreeing to live in good harmony and concord with one another, favouring no side in the civil war. In other places, such as in Nîmes, urban seizures were accompanied by massacres.

The coming of peace after six months would not bring an end to the fighting, and particularly in the south the situation remained volatile and restive.

== Île-de-France ==
In February 1568, the seigneur de La Valette, at the command of three companies of foot soldiers, was entrusted with the defence of Dreux, Houdan, Montfort-l'Amaury and Nogent-le-Roi. He then joined in the defence of nearby Chartres the following month.

=== Paris ===
At the outbreak of hostilities, many Protestants of Paris were expelled from the city. They would not return until after the end of the third war of religion in 1570.

The rebel Protestants seized nearby Saint-Denis shortly after the failure of Meaux, and come the night of 1 October, burning windmills were visible from Paris. A rumour was spread that the Protestants of the capital were preparing bundles of wood and gunpowder so that they might torch Paris. The enraged Catholics proceeded to invade the houses of the various Protestants who had not fled the city, murdering the occupants. The historian Diefendorf describes this episode as prefiguring the later St Bartholomew's Day Massacre, if on a significantly smaller scale.

The bourgeois militia, which had been reformed and rearmed on 29 September (without the proviso that excluded those who had captained the force in prior troubles from participating), played a role in this violence. According to the contemporary Étienne Pasquier, in the days that followed, those who did not put a white cross on their hats (a sign of their Catholicity) were at risk of being assassinated.

In December, the French capital agreed to proffer 1,500,000 livres for the guarding of their ramparts. A further 600,000 livres subsidy was secured by the king in January for the maintenance of the royal army. The capital was traditionally rich in words, that did not follow through into action, making this expression of Catholic devotion a novelty.

The militant Catholics of Paris were frustrated at Catherine's pushes towards peace, as illustrated in one episode from 13 January where Catherine was heckled by a Parisian while addressing the king. According to the English ambassador, Catherine had to conduct her negotiations with the rebels in secret for fear of upsetting Paris. A pamphlet of February decried the folly of coming to terms with rebels who wished to subvert and bring the state into ruin. The only cure to rebellion was to 'uproot it by the sword'.

== Normandy ==
With the outbreak of hostilities, Protestants fled from Paris, some entering lower-Normandy where they linked up with the comte de Montgommery. Here, a war of partisans quickly began to unfold.

At the Estates of Normandy in November, the king was petitioned to provide offices only to Catholics and require professions of faith. Those Protestants currently holding offices should not be permitted to exercise them. Similarly for ecclesiastical benefices, with any held by Protestants to be declared vacant. They further requested that no benefices be leased to Protestants. They sought to see Protestantism removed in its entirety from Normandy, with their ministers exiled and Protestants forbidden from bearing arms.

=== Rouen ===
The Protestants of Rouen had planned to seize the city in coordination with the capture of the king at Meaux. However, when word came of the failure of the Meaux enterprise, the conspirators fled from Rouen. Those Protestants of particular militancy left the city to join the fighting or head to areas where their worship would not be suppressed. Those Protestants who remained behind were disarmed, and the city's defences were tightened. The toleration afforded Protestants in Rouen was revoked, and all Protestant office holders dispossessed. Those Protestants remaining in the city were put under surveillance. Of these, the ones the authorities felt were troublesome, were jailed.

Before the parlement of Rouen in December, the avocat du roi expounded upon the innate tendency of Protestants to conspire to overthrow the crown and establish a republic with the prince de Condé at its head.

=== Caen ===
==== Pact of friendship ====
The major towns where pacts were made between the Protestant and Catholic populations

In Caen, a unanimous convention to maintain cordial relations between Protestants and Catholics was established on 3 October. The assembly which resolved upon this was large, according to Dauvin's estimates containing perhaps 10% of the population of Caen, and was presided over by the sieur de Bras. Notably absent were the lieutenant of the governor, captain de Crécy, and the lieutenant-general of the bailliage Olivier de Brunville. The governor himself was also absent, having departed Normandy itself in August. By its unanimity, the absence of dissent from the arrangement was well illustrated. As with the similar convention of Montélimar, it was to be through legal means that political conflicts and disputes saw their resolutions. The urban values of neighbourliness and commerce were emphasised in the agreement. Though they might be of varying faiths, they are all citizens of Caen.

The terms stated that both confessions enjoyed the umbrella of collective protection. This relied however on a commitment to uphold the strict prohibitions on causing religious outrage or mobilising their faithful. Priests and pastors were to counsel their flocks towards patience. By this means, the Caennais supported their government in the maintenance of order, and the government of the city in turn offered the protection of the law to those of both faiths. Those who transgressed against the other faith, by their actions or words, would be brought before the authorities, where the sentence of death was on the cards. This held true also for the possession of weapons. The presence of strangers in the town was deplored, neither innkeepers nor regular residents were to take them into the city in the present circumstances. The xenophobic elements of the terms coloured all such pacts of 1567.

Many of the contemporary southern pacts were designed to forestall violence, and thus the imposition of a royal garrison. Caen is therefore unique in that it was already subject to a royal garrison at the time it was established. Therefore, Dauvin characterises it as an anticipatory act pending the return of the warlike governor, the seigneur de Méritens.

The sieur de Bras oversaw the submission of remonstrances to the seigneur de Matignon concerning the burden of taxation the city of Caen had to bear thanks to its garrison.

==== Return of Méritens ====
On 7 February 1568, two days before Méritens returned, the sieur de Bras took the initiative to order that under penalty of fine, all breastplates, pikes and helmets that had been previously distributed be deposited in the hôtel de ville.

Méritens returned to the city on 9 February. Bras subsequently met with Méritens in the château and had a difficult conversation. The governor explained he had already made his orders clear in writing and they must be complied with. Returning, letters from Méritens dated 6 and 7 January were 'uncovered'. In these letters, the governor demanded that the households and burghers of Caen finance sixty shovels, sixty stretchers, pikes, gunpowder and various other military provisions. The sieur de Bras was opposed to these measures, and ordered a general assembly be convened to deliberate on them. In the following meeting, the avocat du roi argued that they should comply with Méritens' request. The sieur de Bras carried the day for non-compliance with the governor's orders by 2:1.

Ultimately no confrontation would follow. On 21 February Bras announced that the governor's orders had been complied with, and the city council announced that for want of funds to fulfill it, they were reducing the annuity granted to a deceased burgher to whom several acres of land had been mortgaged. In considering de Bras' retreat, the historian Dauvin offers two possibilities, firstly that he realised the conflict would anger both the king and governor, and secondly that he wanted to show himself a worthy public servant for a senior posting in the city.

In February 1568, the seigneur de Méritens explained that he had in his captivity a 'guardian' of the Protestant seigneur de Colombières, and he was going to put this man on trial.

=== Dieppe ===
The Protestants seized the port of Dieppe. In the king's opinion, they intended to repeat their manoeuvre of the first French War of Religion by handing the place to the English sovereign. Before this project could be realised, it was recaptured for the crown, with the rebels cut to pieces in the reconquest.

== Picardy ==
=== Boulogne ===
Boulogne was governed by the Protestant seigneur de Morvilliers. On 30 September, Morvilliers wrote to Catherine about the local situation. He noted that while the king and queen mother had affirmed the toleration of Protestantism, Protestants in Picardy felt intimidated, and were fleeing their property in large number. Nobles were flocking to Boulogne to gather around Morvilliers and expressed a willingness to fight. Morvilliers assured Catherine, he had appraised them of the crown's good intentions and stopped them from following the war path. He sought Catherine's advice on how to proceed.

By his explanation of events, Morvilliers left open the possibility that he might join the rebellion, as the case for Protestant self-defence was made in his letter. His policy thus depended on the royal response.

The alderman complained to Charles in October that the image of the 'Virgin of Boulogne' was stolen in the night. In the company of their governor, the seigneur de Morvilliers, they conducted a search for it in the households of the city. Unable to locate it, and with witnesses proving unhelpful, they concluded that Protestant soldiers had done it to arouse passions. As a result, it was resolved to grant Morvilliers extraordinary powers for the employ of his soldiers.

From October, Boulogne was subject to sacks by Flemish Protestants. Catholic worship would cease there for six months.

=== Genlis' campaign ===
In the border province of Picardy, the soldiers of the sieur de Genlis carved a path of destruction through the Soissonnais.

Genlis hoped to seize Soissons, Coucy and Noyon. The Noyonnais and Soissonnais were areas in which his family held their principal holdings. Soissons would be successfully seized, with Genlis establishing the seigneur de Vendy as commander of the place.

Genlis acted with a great deal of independence from the prince de Condé's rebel army, and this went so far as negotiating independently with the crown in early 1568.

The seigneur de Chaulnes, a royalist Picard, wrote to the duc d'Anjou (brother of king Charles and commander of the royal army) on 17 February. He explained that with Genlis having made his separate peace with the crown, some other rebels had ceased their fight as well. Those who wished to continue the fight had withdrawn to Soissons, awaiting a general peace established by Condé and the crown.

Vendy, in Soissons, gave assurances to Chaulnes that neither he nor his men would pursue military measures in Picardy. Genlis in turn gave assurances that if Vendy violated this word, Genlis would oppose him. Chaulnes explained that they would cut the passages over the river Oise. This would leave three crossing points, one at La Fère, where Chaulnes was based, that he would guard; one at Noyon, also held by the royalists, which would be similarly protected, and finally the crossing at Chauny, which Genlis would guard.

Defending his conduct in Soissons to the king in April, Vendy explained that he had never troubled the people of the city for grain, only the clergy. This was, until he observed a shortage developing, at which point he took thirty-one measures (a unit of grain) from the Protestant seigneur d'Estrées, for which he owed compensation. The historian Neuschel speculates that a hostile Catholic noble might not have received such consideration. Wine was taken from the villages, but not in such quantities as to provide Vendy's men with a glut. He noted that upon their departure from the area, they left the place in good condition. It was not they who were responsible for the devastation of the local countryside. As per the king's instructions, Soissons had been surrendered to the seigneur de La Chapelle along with its artillery and munitions.

== Champagne and the Three Bishoprics ==
=== Protestant conspiracy ===
According to the diarist of Provins, Claude Haton, in the wake of the first Protestant planning meeting at Châtillon in mid-July, the Protestants of the bailliage of Provins assembled on 1 August, with the most able among them confided in as to the nature of the meeting. Around the start of the war, the Protestant nobility surrounded the province of Brie. They were to meet at the place of Rozay-en-Brie. With the timetable for the conspiracy having been brought forward, ultimately only a smaller amount of the soldiery from the provinces would be able to gather here.

=== Troyes ===
In Troyes, word of the surprise of Meaux increased anxieties in the city. Defences were tightened, and the number of patrols increased. Both Charles and their governor, the duc de Guise, urged them to maintain Troyes in security. A militia of three-hundred men under the command of captain Aspremont was re-established, it having existed during the first civil war.

With the return of persecution in the city, Protestants began to depart as refugees. On 15 November, five Troyen families registered in Strasbourg. Those who had absented themselves had their property subjected to searches by Aspremont's Catholic militia. The discover of hundreds of méreaux (tokens which could function as currency) at the house of Nicolas Pithou was interpreted as evidence of a Protestant plan to surprise and take the city of Troyes. Pierre Pithou noted that this accusation was denied by those Protestants still in Troyes, as well as the moderate Catholics. The houses of Pithou, and several other Protestants served as the stores for Protestant firearms. The discovery of the firearms in Pithou's house by the authorities occasioned the place's military occupation and ransacking. All books and papers belonging to Pithou were burned. Pithou would not return to Troyes for another twenty-six years.

Around the time of the Protestant siege of Paris, the cardinal de Lorraine and duc de Guise, who were then in Troyes, ordered the execution of Protestant soldiers captured near Châlons, as well as religious processions.

==== Arrival of the royal army ====
With the royal army now encamped near Troyes, the property of exiled Protestants was seized, and taxes levied against those who remained, to support its upkeep.

In December, forced loans were raised on the Protestants who had remained in Troyes, while the property of the absent was forfeited. The Protestant men were then expelled from Troyes and the Protestant women put under house-arrest, with orders to turn over to the lieutenant-general Barbezieulx any communications they received from their exiled husbands.

=== Châlons ===
The bishop of Châlons involved himself in the military affairs of the war.

At the place of Châlons, the lieutenant-general Barbezieulx gave notice to the council of the city on 2 October that he would lodge five-hundred men in the city under a captain Lahure. At this council meeting, forty Protestants bid the council intercede with Barbezieulx to allow them to leave the city, a departure that would be without their property, wives or children. The council assented to speak with Barbezieulx on their behalf.

The next day, these Protestants petitioned Barbezieulx himself, he then being in Châlons. While in the first civil war they had fled to Strasbourg, they asked only permission to go to their fields and tend to their affairs. The historian Konnert speculates that this may have derived from a feeling that the war was liable to be short, a keenness not to uproot their lives as they had in 1562, and a confidence that their Catholic neighbors would not trouble them. They also requested the release from prison of a couple of their coreligionists. The council assured them it would do what it could on their behalf.

On 25 October, the duc de Guise inquired of Châlons' council the measures they had taken regarding the Protestants.

==== Action moves into Champagne ====
New demands for the hosting of companies came on 3 December from d'Espaulx, with a request they accommodate another two further companies.

While the council was greatly sympathetic to its local Protestant population, it had less sympathy for outsider-Protestants. Thus, in December, they requested d'Aultry undertake the expulsion of 'foreign' (i.e. outsider) Protestants from their city.

By late December, the royal army at large was to be found near, and on 19 December, the city was tasked with the provision of 200,000 loaves of bread for the army. This imposition, in companion with the three companies they were forced to support, pushed the council to the measure of confiscating Protestant grain (a measure d'Espaulx had suggested). Grain would also be taken from the hôpital Saint-Jacques, the hôtel Dieu and the abbey of Toussaint.

Even with this step taken, the procureur (prosecutor) was to go around the Protestant homes to warn them that their property, in particular their foodstuff, was at risk. It was thus little surprise that in the council meeting of 26 December, it was reported the house searches for grains had yielded very meagre results. In total, the council collected 560 setiers of grain, which was insufficient. They thus remonstrated that they could not meet the royal armies demands.

=== Reims ===
At Reims, the Protestant leader of northern Champagne, the seigneur de Warmeriville attempted to sneak Protestants into the city, so that he might take it by surprise. He was betrayed however by his Catholic wife.

As the main Protestant army entered the area on its retreat from Saint-Denis, a company of soldiers was stationed in Reims to assure the maintenance of the place. The Jean de Monluc's Gascon soldiers, unpaid, were so rowdy that the cardinal de Lorraine wrote to the duc d'Anjou to protest their station in the city. They eventually received a month's pay, partly paid in cloth.

=== Sainte-Menehould ===
Sainte-Menehould, and its château, were governed by the seigneur d'Esclavolles. In October, the duc de Guise commissioned Esclavolles with raising a force of one hundred men to guard the city. These soldiers were to be supported by the inhabitants of Sainte-Menehould, and the villages in a five-league radius around the city. Further, the inhabitants (including those in the abbey) were to move part of their grain supply into the château for the succour of the garrison.

Esclavolles established as his deputy a sieur de Savigny. The assessment of grain was concluded by mid-December. On 23 December, a letter from the duc d'Anjou (brother of king Charles, and leader of the royal army) called on the city to provide the royal army 40,000 loaves of bread and twenty muids of grain. The council demurred on this, noting that the bread would set them back 3,000 livres, and they were already consumed by other expenses (such as repairs to the fortifications and expenses relating to the soldiery).

=== Mézières ===
At Mézières, the governor, La Vieuville was called upon by the inhabitants to come to the defence of the city, they fearing an invasion from the Spanish Netherlands. When La Vieuville came to the place, it was with three companies of Gascons that he stationed in the city as a garrison. This represented a further intensification of hostility between the municipality and their governor that had already been frayed by conflict over La Vieuville's rewriting of the municipal electoral process earlier that year.

=== Provins ===
On 18 December 1567, Haton reported that a young child was kidnapped from their Protestant father and baptised into the Catholic faith. The father was left in the hands of the militia, while the mother was inducted into the ceremony. Both the mother and daughter were then taken away by soldiers.

=== Armies in the area ===
Catholic troops fanned out through Champagne and Brie. They assumed occupying garrisons in the various Protestant fortified houses and château of the territory. Protestant children were forcibly converted to Catholicism.

=== Esternay-Foissy quarrel ===
A certain sieur de Foissy received commission from the French crown to raise ten to twelve companies of infantry for the guarding of Bray, Nogent, Pont and Méry. The noble seized on this opportunity to send troops into the châteaux of the seigneur de Esternay, one of the most efficient loyalists of Condé in the region. The contemporary memoirist, Claude Haton sees a different reason to religious clash for this decision by Foissy, a personal rivalry inspired by a hare that Esternay had hunted onto Foissy's lands.

In retaliation for the occupation of Esternay's château, the Protestants rustled Foissy's cattle and burned his château de La Bernière. Such was the rivalry between Foissy and Esternay that after the coming of peace in April 1568, the crown would attempt to intervene to force Foissy to respect the edict of Amboise.

=== Metz ===
The border city of Metz entered rebellion with the Protestants seizing the citadel of the place in October. The governor, the maréchal de Vielleville, was held under arrest for several days. The cardinal de Lorraine meanwhile pursued secret negotiations with the Spanish relating to Metz.

The Emperor, at a meeting at Fulda on 6 January 1568, broached the topic of the recovery of the Three Bishoprics to Imperial control.

== Burgundy and the Nivernais ==
=== Dijon ===
The Protestants of Dijon were put under arrest on the outbreak of hostilities, and a special tax put on them to cover the costs of their imprisonment. Looking at the tax rolls, the historian Holt observes that the Protestant community it displays was dramatically smaller than that of 1562, containing only 142 names, in comparison with 500-600. Even among these 142 residents, some were dead or had already abjured and rejoined the Catholic fold. Holt credits this collapse in Protestant strength in Dijon to the Catholic League the seigneur de Tavannes had founded in 1567.

=== Coiffy ===
The governor of Coiffy, the seigneur de Beaupré complained to the duc d'Anjou on 5 March that his defence of the city of Langres was being hampered by the population of the city, who refused to furnish him with the gunpowder he requested. The historian Bourquin sees in this episode, the Catholic elites of Langres, being consumed by their conflict with the city's own Protestant population, baulking at the overreach of the royal government that Beaupré embodied.

=== Mâcon ===
Mâcon, which had fallen to the Protestants, was recaptured by the duc de Nevers on 4 December. The authorities of the city argued that those imprisoned as a result of the royalist Catholic victory, should remain so until such time as they embraced Catholicism and through doing so loyalty to the crown.

=== Nivernais ===
In the duchy of Nevers, the royalist defence was led by the duchesse de Nevers. The fighting in this province mainly transpired around the city of La Charité.

While making for Nevers, with a company of 130 gentleman on 14 February 1568, the duc de Nevers was attacked by the Protestants. In the resulting combat, he received a crippling wound to his knee from an arquebus shot that would stay with him for the rest of his life.

== Lyonnais ==
Having been spurned for the position of lieutenant-general of the kingdom in the wake of the constable de Montmorency's death, the duc de Nemours (governor of the Lyonnais) was greatly frustrated. He withdrew from the court to the Lyonnais, so that he might oversee security and finances there.

=== Lyon ===
With rumours swirling of a planned Protestant uprising in Lyon, the Protestants of the city were put in an awkward position. They resolved to flee Lyon, thereby surrendering control of the consulate to their Catholic neighbours.

=== Birague assumes control ===
The lieutenant-general of the Lyonnais, Birague found the Catholic notables of Lyon eager to proffer support. He established extraordinary treasurers with Lyon's consulate permitted to choose one for the city. Their choice was validated by Birague on 2 October.

That same day, Birague requested of Lyon a forced loan. Over the coming days, he issued commissions for the seizure of Protestant merchandise, which was to be deposited in the Celestine monastery, then sold off, with the revenues sent forward to the extraordinary treasurer. With the assistance of the aldermen and judicial officials, Birague drew up rolls for the payment of the forced loan.

On 10 October, the provincial conseil d'État expelled the Protestants of Lyon.

By means of his forced loan, Birague raised 174,990 livres to support the operation of four levies of mercenaries, that would be put under the command of the governor of the citadel of Lyon, Chambery. The money was also put towards 1,000 legionaries which were garrisoned in the countryside of the Lyonnais and Beaujolais under the authority of a certain Saint-Marcel.

== Dauphiné and French Piedmont ==
The Dauphiné with the modern French départements superimposed on top

Civil War in Dauphiné: All marked towns were held by the rebel Protestants during the war.

During the second French War of Religion, the former lieutenant-general of Dauphiné Maugiron, as well as the Protestant leaders the seigneur de Montbrun and the seigneur de Lesdiguières would participate at the head of their respective companies.

=== Protestant organisation ===
In contrast to Languedoc, there would be no provincial political assembly held in Dauphiné by the Protestants, or at least, no record of one survives. This is despite the fact that both provinces were under the overall authority of the baron d'Acier.

An ad hoc council (sometimes referred to as a council of war) would be established in Protestant held Valence around October, in the absence from the province of their lieutenant-general, the baron d'Acier (who had been given authority over Dauphiné, Languedoc and Provence by the prince de Condé). It would contain the leading Protestant nobles of Dauphiné. This included the seigneur de Montbrun, the seigneur de Saint-Romain, the seigneur de Cardé, the seigneur du Gua, the seigneur de Blacons, and the seigneur de Mirabel, in addition to the secretary Bertrand. The exact function of the council is ill understood. It appeared to transmit orders by letter, as evidenced by the receipt in Romans of a letter for the consuls of the city from the council on 28 November.

=== Pacts of friendship ===
The city of Nyons established a pact of friendship between their Catholic and Protestant populations a few weeks before the breaking out of hostilities, on 12 September. This was renewed shortly after the start of the civil war on 29 September.

With the outbreak of conflict, further cities took the initiative to establish pacts of friendship between their Catholic and Protestant populations. This included the Dauphinois cities of Vienne, Romans-sur-Isère, and Montélimar (29 September, 30 September, and 1 October respectively), as well as the nearby capital of the Principality of Orange, Orange (twice, first on 2 October then on 5 October) and Auvergnat town of Annonay which formed a confederation on 2 October.

The declaration of Orange stated that they would live in friendship, with trade to continue, and no allegiance to a party.

The initiative of these towns was a local one. Instructions to form such compacts were not received from outside the city. They largely preceded the fighting of the civil war and arose in such quick succession in various diverse places. Thus, the historian Christin sees them as a spontaneous local desire to continue the success that had been enjoyed in these places at maintaining peaceable relations between 1563 and 1567. The collapse of the edict of Amboise, which in contrast to many places had been a sincere success in these communities, fostered a need to establish a municipal peace.

Some of these contracts were formed as conventions, others as confederations, and still others as simple pacts of friendship. The lack of a unifying justification of the various friendship treaties that proliferated in 1567 spoke to their novelty.

The establishment of these pacts was one devoid of religious ceremony. There would be no processions, or patron saints involved. Such systems of establishment would have been exclusionary to the Protestant participants in the accord. The risks of finding a vague religious formula that might please both confessions was not worth it in the moment. In the triangle of agreement between the two parties, as conceptualised by Paolo Prodi, rather than God at the head, it was the king and his edicts.

Christin ultimately concludes that they were ineffective as instruments. They did not outline which authority would arbitrate confessional disputes, lacked the coercive ability to ensure the parties adhered to the terms, and similarly lacked the ability to impose themselves beyond the walls of their cities. Finally, they could not stop a determined outside force from imposing violence upon the city.

=== Protestant campaign ===
The Protestants in Dauphiné succeeded in seizing cities (Valence, Montélimar, Gap, Die, Romans, and Crest) without significant difficulty under the leadership of the seigneur de Montbrun.. Catherine wrote to the lieutenant-général of the province, the baron de Gordes on 29 October to see to the recapture of these places.

==== Vienne ====
Vienne would be captured by the Protestant force of the seigneur de Saint-Romain, the former archbishop of Aix. Around the start of October, he imposed a tax of 1,566 livres and imposed the selling off of the cities salt supply, to pay for his 2,000 soldiers. The place would play host to a Protestant political council on 4 October. At this council, it was resolved that the royal revenues that were in Montélimar should be seized. This was done on 4 November and then again on 21 January 1568. He ordered the bells of the city be melted down on 22 October.

In a further extraction from Vienne, the seigneur de Cardé gave order to the consuls on 28 October to deliver to him 8,000 livres within two days through a loan on the wealthy Catholics of the city. This sum was negotiated down to 5,000 livres, but even weeks later, on 12 November, only 3,550 of it had been paid.

The Protestant occupation of Vienne was terminated in mid-November. It was later calculated that 28,700 livres had been extracted from the city during the period of its rebel control for munitions and soldier's wages.

The bishop of Gap, Pierre de Paparin, attempted to support the Catholic war cause, however he was unable to hold the city for the Catholics, and forced to flee. At Gap, in October, a certain Protestant named Jean Flotte partially supported the raising of four ensigns to join with the forces of Mauvans and Montbrun through the confiscation of revenues.

At Châteauneuf-du-Rhône, a little way south of Montélimar, the Catholic church was subject to pillaging on 3 November, with its goods auctioned off to support the war effort. This looting and selling off would be repeated in Châteauneuf on 19 January 1568.

At Romans, the consuls were ordered to raise a sum of 6,000 livres for the Protestant soldiery on 29 November.

=== Royalist forces ===
1,000 cavalry had been provided by the duke of Savoy to support the royal war effort. The French crown resolved to leave these troops to deal with local Dauphiné rebellion, rather than bringing them north to join with the main royal army. Unlike in provinces such as Burgundy and Champagne, Catherine held no illusion that she could withdraw forces from Dauphiné to aid the main royal army in the north. Charles wrote to his brother, the duc d'Anjou to explain that he had chosen to leave them with the comte de Tende and comte de Suze instead.

=== Mauvans' march north ===
The seigneur de Mauvans, another leading Protestant commander of the south, established his headquarters in Vienne alongside the seigneur de Saint-Romain (one-time archbishop of Aix who had converted to Protestantism). Mauvans boasted an army of some 2,000 infantry, and 400 cavalry. He bested the company of the seigneur de Saint-Aray in battle, and then made north to Orléans, which was under royalist threat at this time.

As Mauvans passed by nearby Geneva in one of his runs of troops, he gave a pleasant greeting to the city authorities.

=== French Piedmont ===
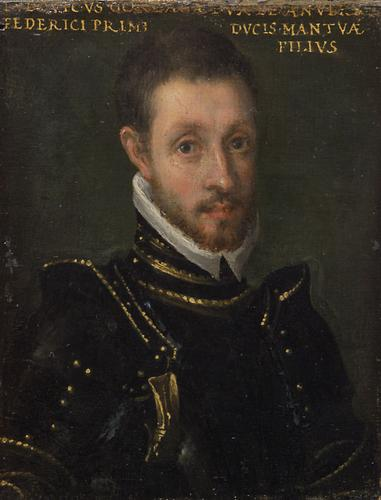
Duc de Nevers, who led an independent army for the royalists during the Second French War of Religion

The duc de Nevers served as the governor of French Piedmont. In the city of Pignerol (modern Pinerolo), a unit of regular infantry was stationed under the command of the comte de Brissac (colonel-general of all the French transalpine infantry). A garrison in the city was under the command of Jean de Monluc. As frontier companies, they stood at a higher percentage of strength than most other peacetime companies. Brissac was not with his company at the outbreak of civil war, rather being involved in military action around Paris. Monluc was in Pignerol at the onset of the war, but would not remain their long, being granted a leave of absence on the outbreak of conflict to join his father, the seigneur de Monluc, in Guyenne.

At the encouragement of Catherine, the duc de Nevers organised the drawing out of a large column from French Piedmont to support the crown up north. He wrote to the duke of Alburquerque (the Spanish governor of Milan) to request permission to raise troops from Italy. Money for various pensions were maintained by Nevers in his capacity as governor of French Piedmont, so that captains might be kept on retainer. With a list drawn up, various captains were then granted money to assemble men. If a captain proved unable to raise the minimum number of men for their company, the promise of a company sometimes had to be rescinded.

Nevers gathered his forces at Carmaignolles (modern Carmagnola). In total, Nevers assembled five veteran French infantry companies (among them Brissac's), and twenty-one Italian companies. A further eight Italian companies were to be raised to bolster the garrisons of Piedmont in the absence of their colleagues.

By mid-November, this force had arrived at Belleville, where a muster was conducted on 18 November, and it was joined by a force of 4,000 Swiss. The army in totality numbered around 8,000 men and was functionally a miniature of the royal army under the duc d'Anjou's command.

== Comtat Venaissin, Orange and Avignon ==
Places captured from the Protestants during the Franco-Papal campaign

In the Papal territory of the Comtat Venaissin, Protestants would be subject to the Papal Tribunal from 1566 onwards, with their property liable to be confiscated from 1 October 1567. In total between 1566 and 1574, around seven-hundred 'heretics' would be condemned to death by the Tribunal. Some of these Protestants were away with the rebel Protestant army, others to be found in Geneva or the principality of Orange, so the actual executions were more limited.

Those Protestants who had previously been banished from the Comtat, moved into the territory with the resumption of hostilities. Mornas was taken and fortified.

In Avignon, processions were held in December for the sake of the preservation of the Catholic church and Charles IX. The archbishop of Avignon and a certain father Possevino devoted themselves to preaching and prayer that might comfort the people. The pope declared a jubilee (the relief of debts) and general pardon. Fasts were also undertaken, as well as the giving of alms.

=== Orange ===
The consuls of the city of Orange, observing the eruption of hostilities once more, resolved to take military precautions to protect their community. They looked to see men of quality and war to the responsibilities of command and guard. The goal of arrangements like this were to ensure military command was held by those who, if not confessionally neutral, would at least respect both Catholic and Protestants. The royalists would not make any attempts against the principality of Orange.

=== Royalist campaign ===
The royalist Catholic counter-offensive was led by the comte de Suze (delegated by the cardinal d'Armagnac to lead the Papal army), along with the seigneur de Sommerive (governor of Provence) and the vicomte de Joyeuse (lieutenant-general of Languedoc). Joyeuse commanded an army of some 2,000 infantry and 600 horsemen, he crossed the Rhône in service of linking up with Suze and Tende. The little fortresses were taken until he arrived at the Pont-Saint-Esprit in February. This place proved more obstinate and his army was divided. Mornas was captured on 1 March. Joyeuse meanwhile crossed the Rhône at Avignon on 7 March and captured Laudun, Orsan, and Tresques before renewing the siege of Pont-Saint-Esprit. Pont-Saint-Esprit would fall to the royalists, as had Tulette and Courthézon.

== Provence ==
As they had during the first French War of Religion, many of the Protestants of Provence fled to the city of Sisteron where they took refuge. They were pursued by the royalists of Provence.

In Marseille during November 1567, the property of Protestants who had fled the city was subject to confiscation. Many Protestants had fled from the city to take refuge in Geneva.

== Languedoc ==
Languedoc, with the modern French départements superimposed on top

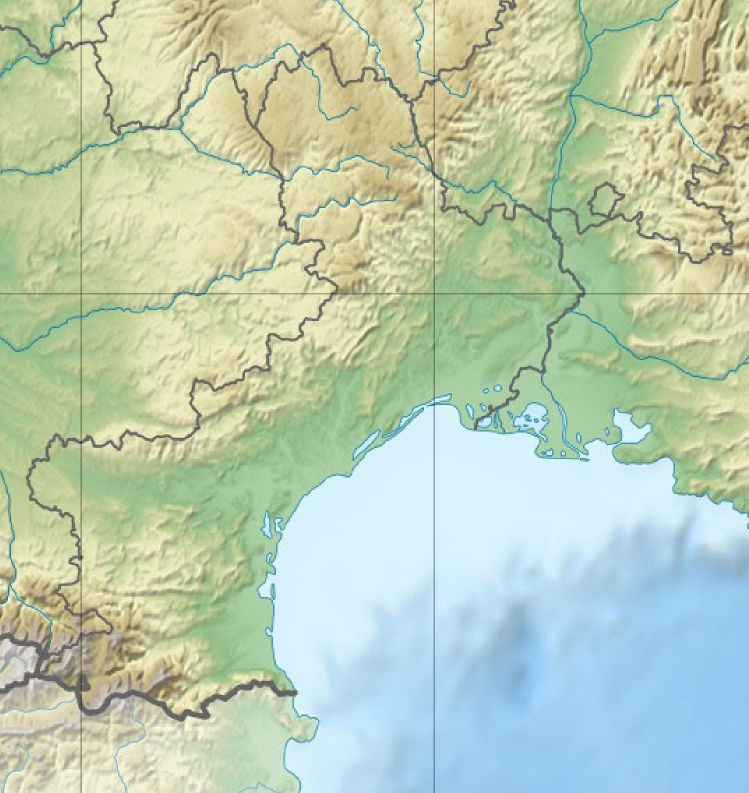
Map of places in and around Languedoc seized by the Protestants, locations with blue markers denote failed Protestant attempts to take control

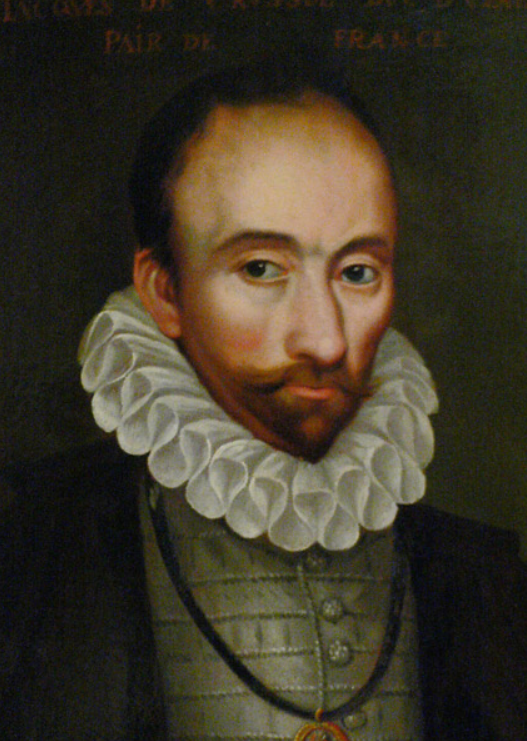
Baron d'Acier, leader of the southern French Protestants during the Second War of Religion

In the first civil war, the Protestants had developed sophisticated parallel political structures in Languedoc. While these had been discontinued during the peace, political assemblies would resume again with the coming of war in 1567. In contrast to the first civil war though, the central Protestant leadership would maintain a far richer dialogue with their allied assemblies in Languedoc, rather than leaving them to their own devices.

The orders sent out by the Protestant leadership to coordinate their uprising were tailored to the circumstances of the locality the message was intended for. This was in contract with the approach of the first civil war, where stock letters written by Theodore de Beza and Jacques Spifame had been distributed to all quarters.

=== Warning signs ===
In the days leading up to the resumption of the civil war, in mid-September, the seigneur de Monluc (lieutenant-general of Guyenne) began to become suspicious of the developing situation. Word had it that envoys had been sent out by the admiral de Coligny to the Protestant churches of Montauban and others in the region. This representative was supposed to have informed the church that they were to prepare for war, the sign for which would be the arrival of a second representative of either the admiral de Coligny or the prince de Condé. This theory appeared to be confirmed by the discovery of a letter announcing plans to assassinate the queen mother Catherine, and Monluc, and seize the king.

Monluc's suspicions regarding Montauban stretched back further than mid-September. He reported that around mid-July orders from the prince de Condé and admiral de Coligny had begun the mobilisation in the city. He also specified that he had become aware of a secret assembly in Montauban. The historian Daussy speculates, giving the timing of this meeting, that it might have related to the regulation of 20 July that the Protestant leadership had established, which reorganised their provincial structures on the lines of secular councils. The historian Brunet credits Monluc with possessing a strong intelligence network, able to uncover the Protestant designs at a moment when they were not taken seriously by others. Indeed, his warnings to the French court were dismissed as those of a warmonger.

=== Protestant leadership ===
Having established himself at the French court in the wake of the first French War of Religion, and been rewarded with his elevation as duc d'Uzès in 1565, the comte de Crussol would not play the leadership role in the second war that he had for the Protestants of Languedoc during the first. Souriac notes that he remained loyal to the crown after the first war.

The prince de Condé therefore entrusted Crussol's younger brother the baron d'Acier with taking charge of an uprising in Languedoc. D'Acier moved south from Brie, passing through the Bourbonnais, Auvergne, Vivarais and lower Languedoc spreading word of the uprising order on his way to Uzès, at which he arrived on 27 September.

D'Acier was afforded a wide purview by Condé over the provinces of Dauphiné, Languedoc and Provence.

D'Acier would come to wield a Protestant army of around 8,000 men, levied from both Dauphiné and Provence. Unlike some of the other southern Protestant armies, d'Acier would keep this one local, prioritising the protection of the Protestant church of Languedoc over supporting the prince de Condé in the north.

While d'Acier would be present in lower-Languedoc to exercise power directly, in upper-Languedoc he designated a representative. In January 1568, d'Acier would select a certain baron d'Ambres (son of the royalist François de Voisins, vicomte de Lautrec) to be his lieutenant for the seneschalties of Toulouse, the Lauragais and Carcassonne. Daussy notes that in practice, his authority was confined to the places of Protestant strength: the diocese of Castres, Albi, Lavaur and Saint-Pons. Ambres enjoyed the assistance of a council for his government. Subordinate to Ambres in turn was the seigneur de Ferrières for the diocese of Castres, he also enjoying the use of a council.

Castres represented the focal point of the strength of Protestantism in haut-Languedoc. The diocesan assemblies here became political assemblies, and provided for the seigneur de Ferrières, the new governor of the city, a council in December 1567. Ferrières would preside over the assembly.

=== Councils ===
A pyramidal structure of assemblies existed for the Protestant rebels of Languedoc. An assembly for the entire province met in lower-Languedoc on the initiative of the baron d'Acier. The resolutions resolved upon here could then be presented to the assembly of upper Languedoc, which, having resolved on the measures to be taken, passed this on to the diocesan level assemblies. Here, tax assemblies were repurposed as political assemblies. We have record of such an assembly for the diocese of Castres, and while Daussy states it would be logical for similar assemblies to have transpired at Lavaur, Albi and Saint-Pons (the other sites of Protestant strength), no such record exists.

==== Montpellier ====
By the means of an assembly at Montpellier, which occurred from 30 October to 1 November a council for monetary and police matters was assigned to d'Acier. It was to accompany d'Acier on his travels. The four members of this council were elected by the assembly, with three of the members (Claussonne, La Roche and Meyrargues) having served in the council afforded to d'Acier's brother in the first civil war. The military council he was granted would be composed at his discretion. Military measures were also undertaken, the gathering of gunpowder and ammunition, with troops to be organised on the level of the diocese. The composition of this council is unknown, but it represented the diocese of Nîmes, Montpellier, Uzès, Viviers, Mende, Gévaudan, Béziers and Lodève.

A council was to be established in each diocese to see to the collection of revenues for the payment of the soldiery and other obligations. 100,000 was to be collected within three months. Nîmes and Montpellier would pay 30,000 of this, Uzès and Viviers 15,000, and Mende 10,000. So that the Protestant population would not be overwhelmed by these impositions, those Catholics who had fled would have their property confiscated, royal revenues would be seized, and a third of the revenues of benefices would be taken for this purpose. In addition to this, the wealthiest Protestants and Catholics would also be taxed. A receiver general and comptroller were also established to monitor the process. Perhaps most unusually, it was also resolved to send a deputy to the court, so that the interests of Languedoc could be defended if peace was already being negotiated. The goal of this figure would be to secure an amnesty for acts committed during the war. This was perhaps motivated by the concerns of the Protestants of Nîmes that they might be prosecuted for the Michelade.

Further political Protestant assemblies would meet in Montpellier (during mid-January) and after the formal conclusion of the war in mid-April. The proceedings of these meetings are unknown.

==== Castres ====
A meeting in Castres between 28 November and 2 December saw the consuls of twelve Protestant held cities gather in the consular house of Castres under the auspices of the seigneur de Ferrières. In addition to deliberating on the resolutions agreed at Montpellier, they also made plans for the defence of Protestantism in the diocese of Castres. They resolved to abide by the Montpellier decisions, copying the resolutions for the diocesan level. A council was also established to support the seigneur de Ferrières composed of six men.

It was agreed to raise 20,000 livres for the payment of the soldiery, with a further 3,000 for munitions. To this end, a 30,000 forced loan would be imposed on the most well off 'seditious' members of the city, i.e. the Catholics. A receiver general and particular receiver were also appointed for the payment of the troops.

A new meeting would be convened in Castres on 9 February by the baron d'Ambres on the orders of the baron d'Acier. This meeting was a broader one than the last meeting of Castres, bringing together deputies from the diocese of Castres, Albi, Lavaur and Saint-Pons. After receiving a report, from some deputies of the Montpellier assembly, measures were undertaken concerning the defence of the diocese.

A new assembly would transpire on 28 February at Castres, though only concerning representatives from the diocese of Castres. Brought together by the seigneur de Ferrières on the orders of the baron d'Ambres, the association of the four dioceses of Castres, Alba, Lavaur and Saint-Pons was approved of. A certain Bouffard was appointed to the council of the baron d'Ambres, he being replaced on the council of the seigneur de Ferrières. A new comptroller of war was also appointed.

==== Privas ====
A meeting would take place at Privas from 26 to 28 November. The chief purpose of this assembly was to bring to pass the decisions of the Montpellier assembly. The 10,000 that was to be raised in the Vivarais had to be arranged. The contours of the following discussions are unknown.

=== Seizing cities ===
Among the cities taken in Languedoc would be those of Castres, Lavaur, Bagnols, Nîmes, Uzès, Alès, and Montpellier. In the Vivarais (a sub-region of Languedoc) in particular, Viviers, Aubenas, Privas, Baix and Le Pouzin would be captured.

==== Nîmes ====
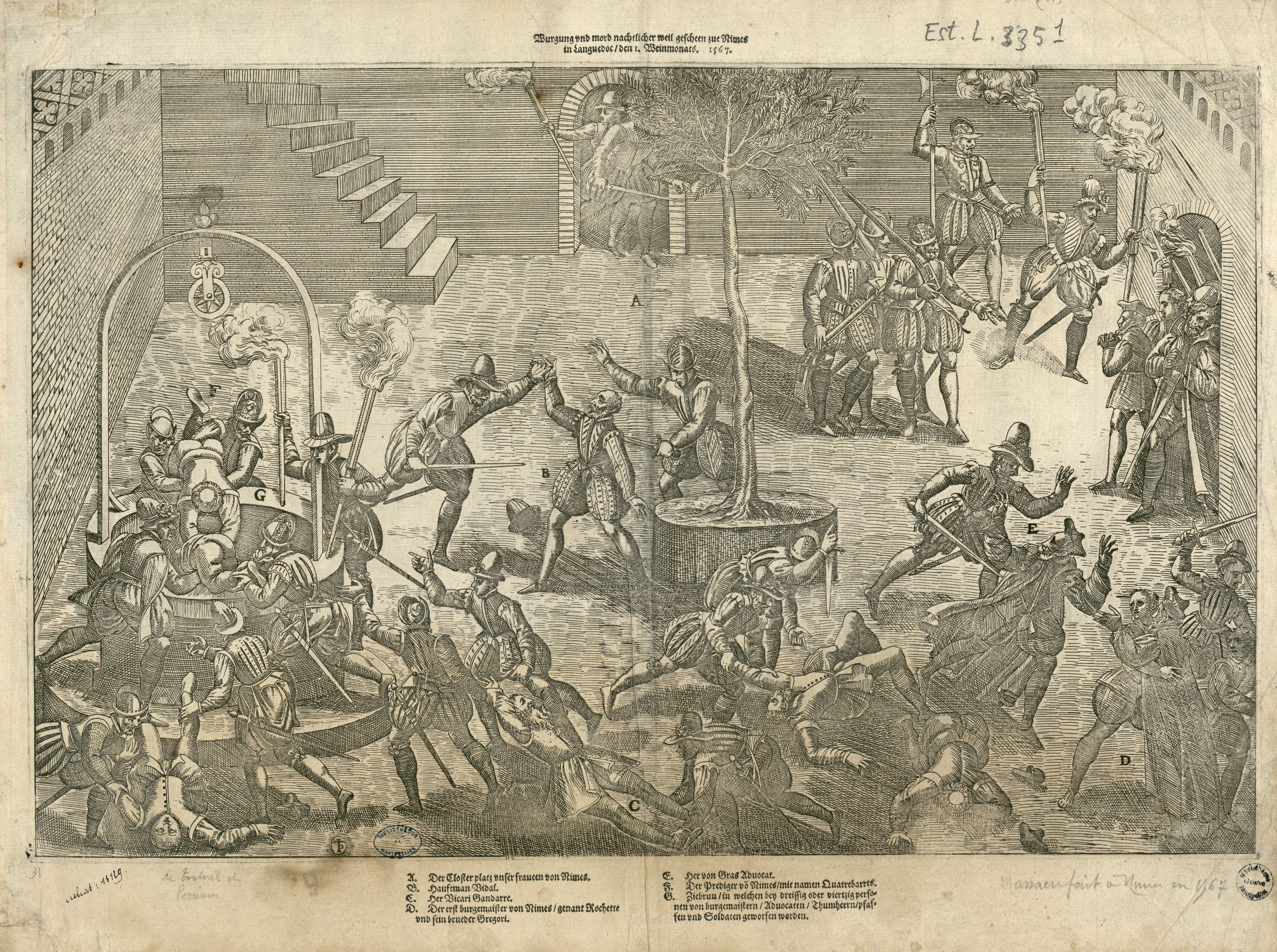
Michelade, the massacre of the Catholic notables of Nîmes

On 27 September, the baron d'Acier, and his brother, Galiot de Crussol made passage through Nîmes. While in the city they spread the word of the coming nationwide Protestant uprising that was planned. Tulchin suspects they met with the seigneur de Servas, who, in collaboration with the juge ordinaire of the présidial were able to weaponise the dispute between the two captains of the guard (Bolhargues and La Garde) to secure the loyalty of Bolhargues for the coup. It is unclear to Tulchin whether Bolhargues brought his men with him for the coup or took command of a Protestant company. Either way, the Catholic consuls would be left with only the château garrison as a defence.

On 30 September, Michaelmas, the Protestants of Nîmes, enraged at their exclusion from the city's consulate, something that had been engineered by the governor of Languedoc the baron de Damville rose up. Appraised of the intentions of the Nîmois, Damville had surrounded the city with a company of Albanian mercenaries. The inciting incident for the Protestant riot would be the jostling of a woman in the market by one of these mercenaries. The historian Garrisson-Estèbe sees both spontaneity and organisation from above in the uprising, which saw participants from all walks of life participate.

The Protestant political leadership, but not the religious leadership, formed itself into a provisional government, known as the Messieurs. The religious leadership sent a representative to Servas, condemning the uprising.

In the first stage of their takeover, the keys were seized, and control asserted over the streets. The keys were in the hands of the first consul Guy Rochette, who had fled to the bishop's palace. Here he was arrested by captain Bolhargues, who was at the head of a company of two-hundred men. Through control of the gates, entrance of Catholic relief could be prevented, and likewise Catholic exodus prohibited. It also gave them power over the agricultural workers of the city, who were chiefly Catholics, and symbolic authority as the keys typically belonged to the consuls.

The Protestants then hunted down various Catholic notables, including members of the local clergy (chief among whom the vicar general and canons) as well as the civic government (the first consul Damville had imposed upon the city: Guy Rochette - eight of the sixteen men who had served as consul between 1564 to 1567, including all Rochette's colleagues) and a handful of the Albanian mercenaries, arresting them. The arrested were sorted on the basis of lists, with some selected to be executed. They killed them at night with blades and pistols in the courtyard of the bishop's palace, throwing the bodies down the well. The choice of this location was likely deliberate, terminating the Catholic party at the place most associated with their strength. Twenty or more were killed in this episode.

Exaggerating contemporaries put the death toll far higher, at between 120 and 200, Garrisson-Estèbe finds no reason to lend these figures credence. She describes the targets of the Protestant violence as carefully chosen, those figures deemed by the Protestants of Nîmes responsible for their oppression. Among those killed were two who had served as consuls: Rochette, and the former consul de Gras. One of the Catholic members of the présidial court (a certain Jacques Barrière). This event became known as the 'Michelade'. The violent action was denounced by the Protestant consistory and the municipality. Nevertheless, Nîmes had declared itself for the Protestant cause.

Over the coming days, all churches with the exception of Saint-Eugénie were ordered destroyed by the Protestant leadership. This place being used for the manufacture of gunpowder. The bishop's palace was similarly destroyed and the houses of priests and some lay Catholics. Some rich Catholics had their homes pillaged, their property looted, ecclesiastical records and church furniture were destroyed. Special taxes were levied across the population of Nîmes for the payment of Protestant soldiery, but the taxes were levied at a higher rate on the Catholics (with ecclesiastical revenues also looked to be secured). Soldiers were billeted in Catholic households, with those who protested being given more soldiers to lodge.

With the initial focus on the liquidation of the Catholic leadership, the planned assault on the château of Nîmes was delayed, thereby allowing its defenders to prepare, and become appraised of the seriousness of the Protestant resolve. The Protestant soldiery was inexperienced, and the garrison held for six weeks. The Protestant approach was a methodical one, digging trenches around the château, with the employment of Catholic labourers (who if they wished to absent themselves had to pay for the acquisition of a substitute labourer). A relief force from Tarascon was not able to relieve the defenders. Over the objections of the captain La Garde, the garrison, low on food, indicated their willingness to surrender on 10 November. La Garde, and another nine soldiers were permitted to depart with their arms and baggage, and the rest of the garrison depart with swords and daggers alone. The final surrender occurred on 15 November. The Catholics who had not been killed were assured of their safety and could either come back to Nîmes or make their departure.

The parlement of Toulouse would later conduct an inquiry into the affair. The witnesses to the violence could not name more than the 20 or so high-profile targets as victims of the violence. They were able to name a much larger list of Protestants who participated in the murders, as well as the destruction of churches.

==== Castres ====
Though the city consulate had returned to Catholic hands during the peace of 1563 to 1567, Castres would again be seized by the Protestants at the outbreak of the second war of religion. According to the Catholic commander Jacques Gaches, a certain seigneur de Fiac was sent to the Protestant leadership. Having returned he led the plans for the seizure of Castres. The seigneur de Ferrières and seigneur de Montlédier were tasked with conducting the capture of Castres and its Catholic population. The city was thus invested on 29 September by the very captains that had held it during the first war. It would fall effortlessly, caught by surprise.

==== Montpellier ====
The Protestants briefly regained control of the city of Montpellier during the occasion of the second civil war. The cathedral was put to siege and then ransacked by the victorious Protestants, it would not host Catholic service again until 1634. The canons and priors fled, and Catholics were murdered. Various churches in the city were torn down across a few days in 1568.

==== Other places ====
In the surrounds of Rieux-Volvestre, south of Toulouse, the Protestants seized the places of Carla-Bayle, Le Mas-d'Azil and Le Fossat. The Catholic royalists of Rieux complained that they committed robbery, murders, raids, and other acts in defiance of public order.

=== Protestant military activity ===
Protestants from Castres, expanded outwards into the Albigeois, killing Catholics and burning down houses as they advanced. Labourdette estimates that within the first month of the conflict 800 houses were put to the torch, and 2,000 Catholics killed in this area.

At Viviers, around the end of October, the cathedral treasury would be looted under the direction of the seigneur de Saint-Alban. The seized contents would be melted down into silver coins.

The bishop of Vabres, François de La Vallette, protested to Charles that he, and several other clerics, had been made prisoner by the Protestants, with a ransom that was too rich. Further, he protested that the revenues of his diocese had been in Protestant hands, along with his diocese.

The rebel Protestants tried and failed to besiege Beaucaire and Aramon.

Much of the rebel Protestant movement in upper Languedoc, Quercy and the Rouergue was under the authority of the vicomtes (viscounts). This included the vicomte de Bruniquel, the vicomte de Caumont, the vicomte de Paulin, the vicomte de Candars et Panat, the vicomte de Montamat, the vicomte de Montclar (also known as the baron d'Ambres) and the vicomte de Goudon.

The military reputation the vicomtes built over the course of this campaign ensured that they were entrusted with military authority in the south of France by the Protestant leadership for the next few years of war.

While some of the forces of the vicomtes would travel north to support Condé, others would turn back, returning to Languedoc.

At Gaillac, the vicomte de Paulin, oversaw the massacre of 100 Catholics.

=== Royalist Languedoc ===
The vicomte de Joyeuse, lieutenant-general of Languedoc, imposed a system of forced loans on the wealthier residents of the cities of Languedoc. The rolls that determined who qualified as well off, were drawn up in collaboration with the municipal notables, with the Protestant citizens topping the lists. While Catholics were in theory subject to this forced loan, Joyeuse excused the town councillors of Narbonne and some other places from having to contribute. In the diocese of Béziers, Catholics who paid would receive compensation in the form of confiscated Protestant property. Thus, the forced loan was materially an anti-Protestant property confiscation. To oversee this forced loan for each of the twenty-two diocese, including those under Protestant control, Joyeuse appointed an extraordinary treasurer of war. Béziers was granted permission to select its own candidate.

By means of these extraordinary taxation efforts, Joyeuse collected 300,000 livres.

==== Toulouse ====
No sooner had conflict erupted than strategic offices in Toulouse fell under the control of militant Catholics. Those capitouls (civic leaders of Toulouse, equivalent to consuls in other towns) deemed suspect were removed and replaced with appropriately Catholic candidates in the coming months. The capitouls and magistrates re-entered the city guard. Members of the clergy were to stay in their churches, and women in their homes, to stave off the possibilities of fires that might divert valuable manpower.

Orders were given to prepare captains and confederates for war. The seigneur Monluc, writing to Charles on 31 September, opined that the threat of insurrection in Toulouse was equal to that during the first civil war. He gave orders to the baron de Terride to make military preparations in Toulouse. Eight Catholic captains, each with no less than 50 men, should be deployed to the various districts of the city.

Arriving in Toulouse on 5 October, the Spanish agent Bardaxí listed the various towns in the environs of the city in which Protestants had risen up. This included Revel, Villeneuve d'Agen, and Grenade-sur-Garonne among others. The Protestants issued an appeal by which they declared that their assumption of arms should not be viewed as contrary to the interests of king Charles. Rather, it was to frustrate a Spanish plot to seize France, and they would devote 40,000 men and 20,000 cavalry to the king's service against Spain. In Bardaxí's estimation, only around 12,000 men and 2,000 cavalry were raised by the Protestants. Against them, 6,000 infantry and 2,000 cavalry had already been raised. The Protestant plot would be a failure in Toulouse.

On 25 November 1567, the seigneur de Bellegarde ascended to the role of governor of Toulouse. He was a Commingeois captain and enjoyed strong relations with the parlement and capitoulate of Toulouse built during the first French War of Religion where he had played a role in the royalist fight for the city. He could thus serve as an intermediary between the local administration of Toulouse and the royalist Gascon captains. In addition to his military role in Toulouse, he enjoyed military authority over the Commingeois, Bigorre and Astarac, authority delegated to him by the seigneur de Monluc, as well as the Lauragais. He would coordinate the defence inside Toulouse, while Monluc and the baron de Terride dealt with defence external to Toulouse. Meanwhile, the provincial governor of Languedoc, Damville, was occupied with affairs in the east of his province.

Protestants were put on trial in Toulouse in absentia, for those that had fled to Montauban or other places to join the rebel armies. Among Protestants who remained in Toulouse, fines were issued against those who could not be trusted to fulfil guard duty responsibilities, as well as those who had failed to contribute to the forced loan imposed on them.

As they had in the first civil war, the parlement of Toulouse also took the initiative to seize royal revenues to meet local military financial needs. To this end the premier président (most senior judge of the Toulouse parlement) authorised the sequestering of 24,500 livres of royal revenue in October 1567. This was done without royal approval, and after the first war had been retroactively sanctioned by the crown when Charles released Toulouse of the obligation to repay the sum they had taken. Money, raised in collaboration with the vicomte de Joyeuse, was to be devoted to supporting the soldiers flooding into Toulouse. This would be the last time the parlement seized revenues on this scale from the crown, though some local instances of such acts would follow subsequently. In addition to seizing royal revenues, forced loans would be imposed by the parlement and capitouls on the wealthy residents of Toulouse. In November, it was declared that those Protestants who had absented themselves, or fled to Castres/Montauban/Puylaurens would have their property seized and inventoried.

An edict of January 1568, spearheaded by the premier président of the parlement of Toulouse, Daffis, banned dances, public games, masks, false beards, wigs, and clothes that could disguise.

=== Catholic campaign ===
==== Mustering soldiers ====
The parlement of Toulouse took a leading role in the fight against the Protestants. In addition to providing legal justification for French subjects to take up arms, it also assumed the responsibility of raising military companies itself. On 6 October 1567, the seigneur de Montmaur was instructed to raise two-hundred men from around Aurignac and bring them to Toulouse. This did not represent an isolated case, with many other similar commissions being issued by the parlement. For example, the seigneur de Mauro received commission in October from the parlement, so too the seigneur d'Endoufille. A certain de Corne, who had experience fighting in Toulouse in May 1562, found himself at the head of 200 infantry arquebusiers around this time. Given the regions it was demanded the troops be raised from, in practice this meant levies of civilians under the authority of their seigneur, not hardened soldiers.

A general muster of the military of Toulouse was undertaken in November 1567, bringing all the armed forces into one place. The armed, and the capitouls in their robes, were then to march out the city in a procession, leaving through one gate and returning via another. Souriac describes this military display as being ostentatious.

Inspired by the example of Toulouse, civil assemblies in Languedoc also looked to raise soldiers. That of the diocese of Rieux petitioned the parlement of Toulouse in March 1568 for the right to elect a captain for the diocese, as well as two-hundred foot-soldiers, and the money required to finance the aforementioned soldiers. On 23 March, they received the all clear, that this effort would not be impeded. The diocese took this permission and ran with it, working to establish a small army under its own authority.

The seigneur de Saint-Michel assented to the charge of captain that the diocese offered him. He was to raise two-hundred men, and a sum of 6,480 livres was ordered raised, and though there was some reluctance the money was found. With Monluc also maintaining men within the diocese of Rieux on the perimeter of the comté de Foix, the diocesan authorities divided the lands of responsibility so that no one would end up paying for both companies. The lands under the spiritual but not fiscal dominion of the diocese would pay for Monluc's men, while those under the fiscal dominion of the diocese would pay for the diocesan company.

By royal commission of 29 October 1567, the comte d'Aubijoux, was given the authority in the Albigeois, Castres and Lavaur to raise what soldiers he felt necessary to preserve the territory within royal control. He would be militarily active in the Albigeois during the war.

==== Action in the field ====
Monluc would besiege Montauban for a time, before being called away to deal with the Protestant seizure of La Rochelle. Álava, who was in a period of hostile relations with the seigneur de Monluc after his November outbursts, derided Monluc's siege effort of Montauban, in a letter of 11 January 1568, as accomplishing little more than looting, which sufficed for the commander.

With word reaching the king that the situation in Languedoc, Provence, the Lyonnais and Dauphiné was proceeding in a negative direction, he ordered the duc d'Anjou peel off from his army the comte de Ventadour and his compagnie. Ventadour enjoyed great authority in these regions, and the king hoped he would be a productive presence in the south.

== Lands of the Queen of Navarre ==
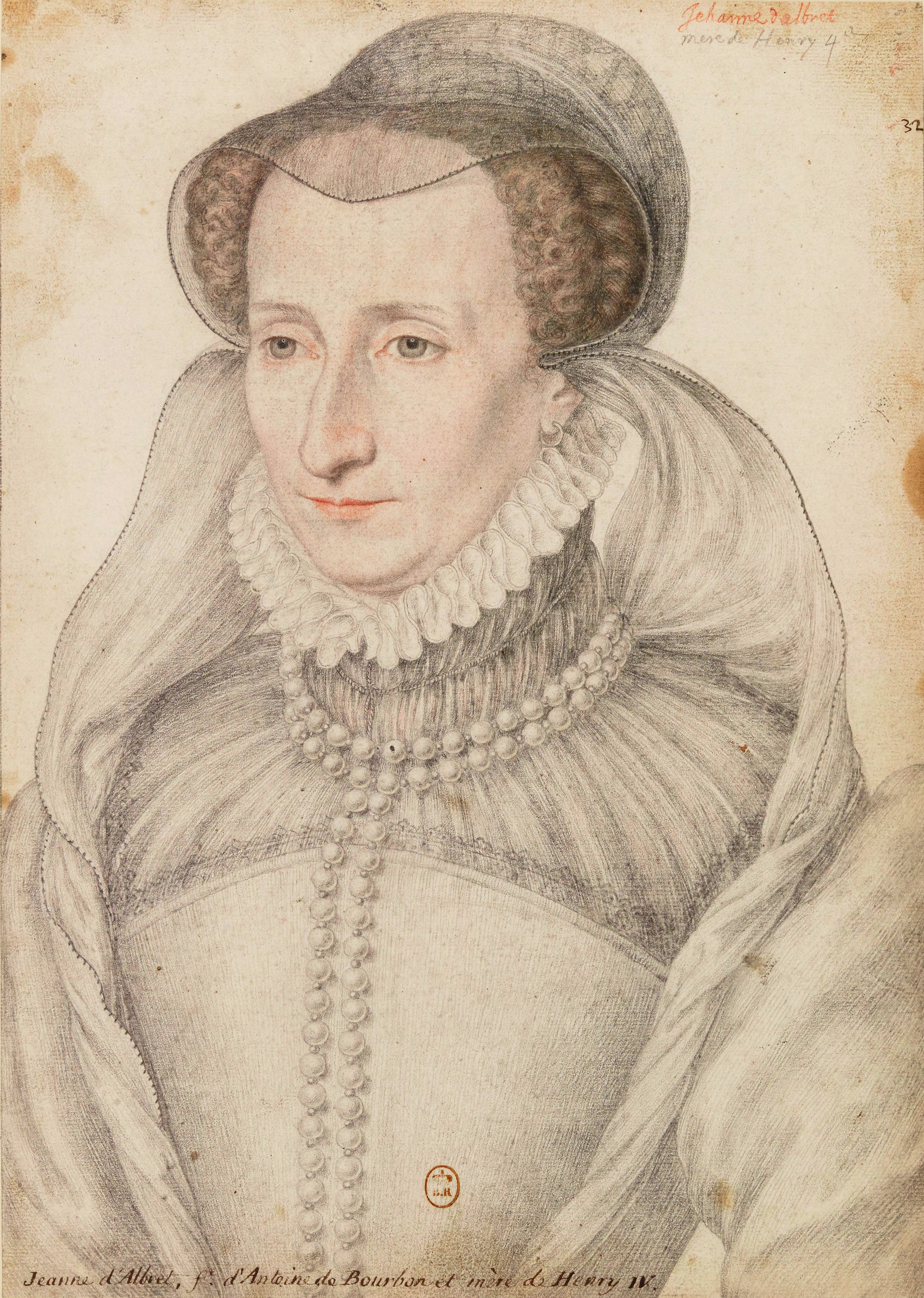
Jeanne d'Albret, queen of Navarre, who claimed a position of neutrality during the Second War of Religion

The seigneur de Monluc, in his capacity as lieutenant-general of Guyenne, forbade Jeanne from raising soldiers in her non-sovereign French territories. The queen of Navarre protested to the parlement of Bordeaux, but the body sided with the seigneur de Monluc. In February 1568, the seigneur de La Mothe-Fénelon was sent south to liaise with Jeanne. He reprimanded the parlement of Bordeaux for its ruling.

On 3 October, from Tarbes, the queen of Navarre, and her son the prince de Béarn, wrote to the seigneur de Monluc. They reproached him for not having appraised them of events. Monluc gave his response on 6 October, in it, he noted that the Protestants were the cause of the troubles, and that he only had a duty to report to the king of France who would task him with restoring order. He prayed that Charles would give proper orders to see himself remain as master of France.

=== Frustrated plans ===
Jeanne learned of the failures of the seizure of Dax, as well as that of Meaux while in Saint-Gaudens (part of her vicomté de Nébouzan). She resolved to return to Béarn. She entrusted the first baron of Foix: the sieur de Rabat, with convening the Estates of this comté. With the seizure of Lectoure also a failure, and with revolt continuing in lower-Navarre, the queen of Navarre would assert a position of neutrality in the national civil war. Nevertheless, seeing the possibility open that the queen of Navarre would enter her lands of lower-Navarre, Philip II instructed the governor of Hondarribia to proffer aid to the governor of Bayonne as necessary.

=== Foix ===
Foix occupied a place external to the royal domain and thus the unrest here was accelerated by the fact the place was not under the jurisdiction of either Languedoc or Guyenne, and therefore external to the suppression efforts undertaken in these places. The core of the Protestant effort in Foix was led by a member of the Lévis family, the baron de Bélesta. This figure was present at the Protestant assembly at Mazères which resolved upon hostilities. Leading an army, he made for Castres so that he might join with the army of the prince de Condé, burning down the abbey of Boulbonne on route. The Catholics responded by seizing Mazères and pillaging and slaughtering in the city.

In Tarbes, itself in the Bigorre, the Catholic bishop, Gentian de Bussy d'Amboise hoped to militarily support the Catholic cause, but he had to flee from his see.

On 20 September, Jeanne departed for the comté de Foix, a territory in which she was comtesse. In October she was to preside over the Estates of Foix, with a view to reversing the pacification work undertaken by the seigneur de Monluc in Pamiers and the city of Foix, and see Protestantism established there. With her for this was the comte de Gramont, the seigneur de Monein, her son the prince de Béarn (future king Henri IV) and the other elements of her court.

The Estates of Foix met under the leadership of the sieur de Rabat, on 27 December at Varilhes. The disorders of Pamiers and Foix were addressed, and the royal taxation endorsed. The absence of the queen of Navarre meant that more radical religious measures were not up for consideration.

=== Navarre and Béarn ===
According to the Guevara, with rumours of war in the air, Charles had ordered the captains of lower-Navarre and Béarn who had retired to their estates for the winter, to instead return to their companies. Commissioners had been dispatched to see them supplied with munitions, and artillery. Pikes were to be brought to Bordeaux from Mauléon.

In his report of 28 October to the Spanish sovereign, Guevara reported on Jeanne's religious policies in Béarn by which revenues from vacant benefices were to be allocated to Protestants. Catholicism still existed in the territory, with Mass said, and the Sacrament taken to the sick, but the Mass involved no procession, and the solemnity with the Sacrament was limited to the priest alone. The Protestants meanwhile paid great heed to their ministers. Guevara contrasted the situation with that of lower Navarre, which he felt was far more promising for the Catholics, and indeed, possible for Spain to conquer. While noting that Guevara was a fervent Catholic, Brunet tempers this by pointing out Guevara's fairly clinical and emotionless approach to describing the religious evolution of Béarn. The Spanish agents, Juan and Felipe de Bardaxí, in a report of the same day, noted that fearful of the seigneur de Monluc, the Béarnais had gathered together. Ultimately, Monluc, who was in Bordeaux, made north instead.

=== Spanish frontier ===
Writing to the viceroy of Navarre in October, Philip signed off on the dispatch of troops from the borders of Castile into France. It was further added that the garrisons of Hondarribia and San Sebastián be reinforced by one-hundred-and-fifty men. All intelligence of utility was to be gathered.

== Guyenne ==
Guyenne, with the modern French départements superimposed on top

Gascony, which was integrated into the governorship of Guyenne, with the modern French départements superimposed on top

Towns seized by the Protestants in Guyenne and its surrounding provinces. Blue markers denote failed attempts at seizure.

The Spanish agent, Felipe de Bardaxí, recorded that the Catholics took all the places they were able in Guyenne.

=== Protestant army of Guyenne ===
The Protestant gathering point for Guyenne would be the town of Confolens. Here, the seigneur de Puygreffier et Saint-Cyr gathered a contingent of an unknown size. He would be joined there by a force under the baron de Pardaillan and seigneur de Piles. Then came the Poitevan cavalry under the seigneur de Belleville, seigneur de Puyviaud and seigneur de Saint-Martin de La Coudre. This army reached in sum perhaps 6,000 infantry and 2,000 cavalrymen. This amalgamated army was put under the authority of the comte de La Rochefoucauld, who was charged by the prince de Condé with bringing it to him.

=== Monluc's campaign ===
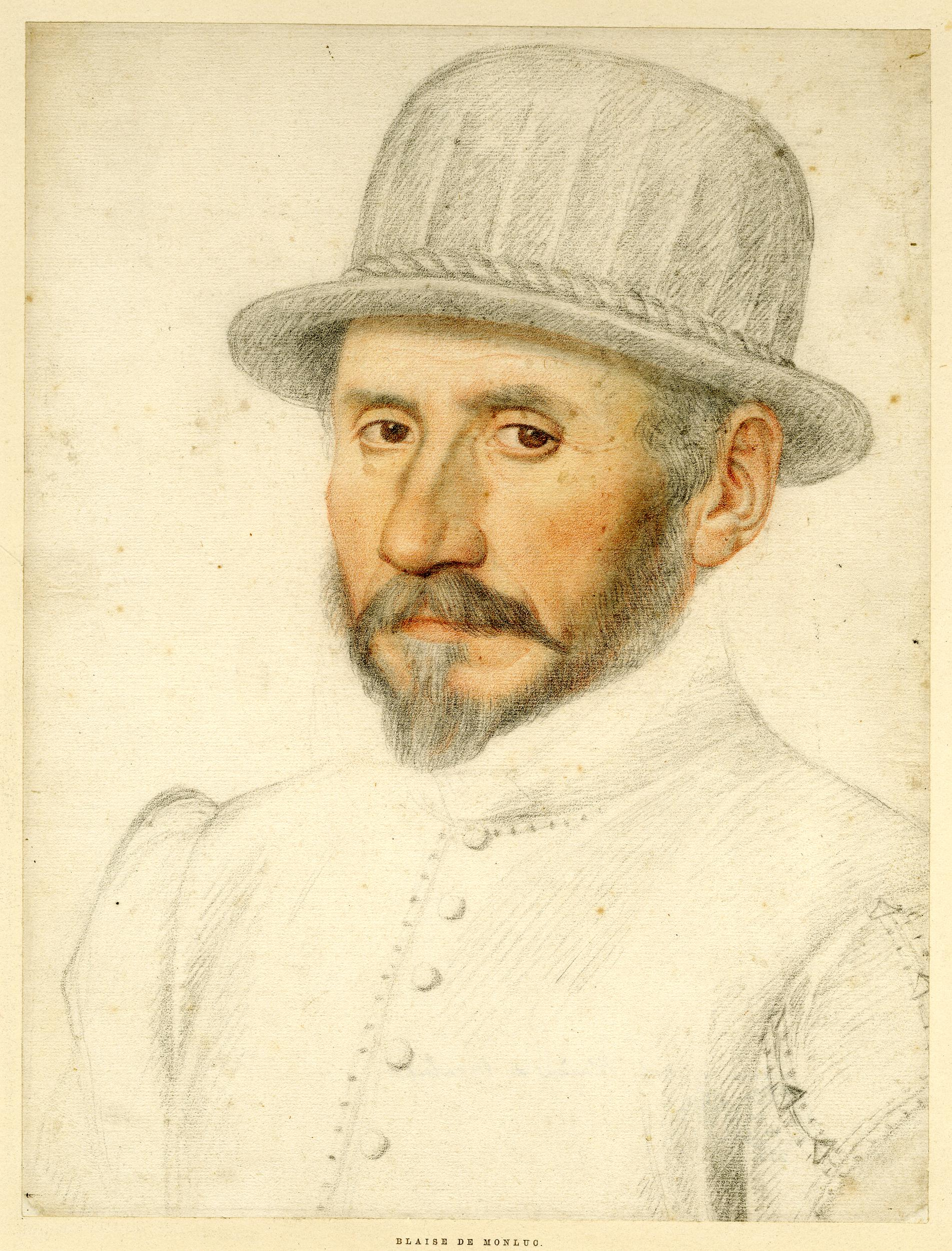
Seigneur de Monluc, lieutenant-general of Guyenne and royalist-Catholic commander during the war

Having cut short his intended restive break, the seigneur de Monluc, lieutenant-general of Guyenne, was appraised that the Protestants of Bergerac were arming. Shortly before his departure for a hunt on 29 September he received news of the rebel Protestant plan. In this telling the Protestants aimed to kill him and the queen mother Catherine, kidnap king Charles and seize various population centres.

==== Lectoure ====
Monluc, with a handful of companions hurried for Lectoure. Once there, he dismissed the baron de Fonterailles (whose reliability he was sceptical of, and who would join with the Protestant rebel queen of Navarre during the third civil war in 1568) from charge over the château de Lectoure.

A little after the departure of Fonterailles, a host of Protestants arrived outside Lectoure, intending to carry the place with assistance from allies inside. These troops were under the command of a certain vicomte de Montamat. The historian Brunet sees this as an endeavour of the queen of Navarre's. Monluc was able to scare this party off. Several Protestants were arrested and interred by Monluc in Lectoure. According to a report of the Spanish agent Juan de Bardaxí of 5 October, they had planned to wipe out the leadership of the house of Lorraine-Guise, see the original 1562 edict of Saint-Germain promulgated, and attack Spain in alliance with international Protestants. Having installed a garrison in Lectoure, Monluc left the city.

==== Agen ====
From Lectoure, Monluc made for Agen, arriving either on 28 or 29 September. From here, he put the word out to the consuls and magistrates of his territory to prepare their defences and ordered the replacement of unreliable commanders. The governor of Guyenne, the young prince de Béarn (son of the queen of Navarre), reproached the seigneur de Monluc for ordering all these things without appraising him. Monluc ignored this rebuke, retorting that he answered only to Charles IX.

It was only in the days after this mobilisation that Monluc had undertaken that the lieutenant-general received from the king an account of events the court had been subject to at Meaux, something that he disseminated to the sénéchaux, échevins and nobles of the south-west.

At Condom, Monluc established the seigneur de Pomès. Pomès saw to the walling up of the cities various gates, with the exception of two, and the establishment of a guard at Casteljaloux.

==== Monluc marches north ====
Monluc was urged by the court to hurry north, so that he might assist in the protection of the king. He would tarry for a significant time before making the journey however. During the wait he undertook the redistribution of commands, and the assembling of his compagnie. His force was a large one, boasting twenty-five companies of infantry, nine companies of men-at-arms, six hundred light cavalry and a further four hundred volunteers. His son, Jean de Monluc, served as commander of one of the Gascon companies going north. On 9 November, he and his men had made it north to Limoges. He chafed at the slowness with which pay was provided to his host.

==== Disgrace ====
A little while later, on 13 November, while he was in Saint-Julien-le-Petit, Monluc was appraised that upon the instruction of the constable de Montmorency, Bordeaux, and the wider Bordelais had been removed from his lieutenant-generalcy, and granted to the comte de Candalle, who assumed the title of lieutenant-general. Candalle was the son-in-law of the Constable. The Gascon commander exploded when he heard the news, feeling his removal was a great injustice. He flew off ill-tempered letters to Catherine and various great nobles. He proclaimed his disgrace, and denounced the seigneur de Damville, Montmorency's son and the governor of Languedoc, for his alleged 'inaction'.

When, a little while later, word arrived of the death of the constable de Montmorency, he celebrated the death, noting that the grandee was now in hell. He added further that the only man now missing in hell was the cardinal de Lorraine. He would later have to retract these comments. Claiming he personally had not been ordered to go north, he left his company in the hands of the baron de Terride and left southwards, going via Sainte-Foy and Bordeaux back to Agen. His son would continue on to Paris in his absence, and become embroiled in a dispute with the comte de Brissac (his fellow company officer in the French Piedmont town of Pignerol). The young Monluc fancied himself entitled to the position of colonel of the regiments that he had raised, and rejected the idea that either Brissac or Strozzi in their capacities as colonel-generals of the infantry might have authority over him. He would lose out in this struggle.

Sournia characterises Monluc's withdrawal south as a strategic blunder, arguing he could have enjoyed a role in the aftermath of the royal victory at Saint-Denis on 10 November.

For unknown reasons, the seigneur de Monluc covertly met with two sons of the old constable de Montmorency in the countryside: the new duc de Montmorency and the seigneur de Damville, according to a report of 15 December by Álava to Philip.

==== Saintonge campaign ====
The seigneur de Monluc dispatched a certain Madaillan to Saintes, instructing him to proceed with all hast. Madaillan was to assault the Protestants of Marans if they were still to be found at Saint-Séverin. Monluc ordered Madaillan to follow a policy of offering no quarter, in the hopes such a massacre would instil fear. Madaillan did just this, slaughtering the Protestants of Marans, capturing three flags in the process. In total, at Saint-Seurin the Protestants lost around five-hundred men.

Monluc then advanced a few days later to Marennes, bringing with him the cavalry company of the seigneur de Merville and part of the baron de Jarnac's company. The rest of Jarnac's company being Protestant had gone to unite with Condé.

In Marennes, Monluc united with the comte de Marennes, the royal governor of Saintonge. Plans were hatched by which the comte de Marennes would be restored to control over his territories of the Île d'Oléron and the Presqu'île d'Arvert (peninsula d'Arvert).

To return the Île de Ré to the royal fold, a certain Lebéron, a nephew of the seigneur de Monluc, was dispatched with five-hundred arquebusiers. This force set sail from Brouage, fighting the wind as they made their progress, as well as the islanders who tried to prevent their landing. Initially the expedition foundered. The force thus took a roundabout route, landing on the other side of the Île. Having successfully landed, the royal force marched on the largest fortification, first surrounding it, and then winning it. All those found there were killed, as Monluc had instructed. Much as Monluc had anticipated, fear quickly gripped the rest of the islanders, who abandoned the other fortifications Lebéron had yet to seize, departing for La Rochelle. This surprise of the Île de Ré transpired only a few days before the coming of peace in March 1568.

From Bordeaux, Monluc conducted a muster of his compagnie d'ordonnance (heavy-cavalry company) on 10 March 1568. In the absence of his son, Jean de Monluc, his son-in-law the seigneur de Fontenilles served as the lieutenant. The size of Monluc's compagnie had expanded by 40 men-at-arms and 60 archers, bringing him up to a theoretical strength of 100 lances.

=== Bordeaux ===
Within days of the opening of hostilities, militant Catholics would assume control of strategic offices in Bordeaux and undertake preparations for war. Among the jurade (municipal government) and the parlement (one of the highest courts in France), the seigneur de Monluc instituted a confession of faith on 4 November, with those refusing to partake in it, or admitting to Protestantism to be expelled from their position. He enjoyed the support of the archbishop of Bordeaux, Sanssac, in this, the cleric urging him to go further, and see Protestants excluded from all public offices.

==== Catholic regime ====
The Catholic hierarchy of Bordeaux issued arrêts banning the practice of Protestantism and curtailing movement about the city.

In November, the clergy of Bordeaux requested of Monluc a crackdown on the wives and families of Protestant officials, who had until this point enjoyed immunity from prosecution due to their relations. They also requested the Protestants of Bordeaux be subject to levies to pay for the war preparations, as it was their coreligionists that had thrown the kingdom into civil war. Monluc approved of these proposals, and ordered the jurade to start levying a tax on the Protestants, and that soldiers be quartered in Protestant homes. The clergy also charged that safe refuges had been created for the Protestants at Mussidan, Bergerac, Sainte-Foy, and Montauban, and that these served as bases for rebel Protestants to strike out at Catholics.

Writing to Charles in November, Monluc apprised the king of the clergy's accusations, and informed the crown that he had created an emergency council for the defence of Bordeaux with himself and the président Roffignac at its head. Delegations from the clergy, the châteaux of Bordeaux, and the bourgeois, formed part of its body. Unlike during the first civil war, the crown would not object to this militant Catholic organisation.

==== Parlement ====
In the autumn of 1567, those councillors (lower ranking judges) in the parlement of Bordeaux were hounded out of the body. The moderate premier président (the most senior judge), Lagebâton, had supposedly gone into hiding with the outbreak of war, and his enemies seized on the opportunity to be rid of him. Around the start of December, the Catholic clergy requested an emergency session be convened to indict him for desertion, thereby removing him from office.

=== Montauban ===
The city of Montauban took up arms in favour of the rebel Protestants on 29 September. The fortifications the municipality had been obliged to tear down after the royal visit in 1564 were hastily reconstructed. Control of the civic organs, which had been spread between the Protestants and Catholics were returned to a monopoly of Protestant control. The Protestant governor of Montauban, Pierre de Rapin, had played a role in the Grenade affair of 1564, and governed Montpellier for the Protestants during the civil war of 1562.

The gathering of Protestant forces in Montauban from the surrounds alarmed Toulouse. The administrators of the city imagined the force was intending to march on the Languedoc capital, capturing the places around the capital first, before taking Toulouse and murdering all the Catholics (the 'King's obedient subjects'). The fortifications were thus strengthened, and the militia put on alert. Known Protestants in Toulouse were to be spied upon.

In December, the 'victory' of the prince de Condé at the battle of Saint-Denis was greeted with great enthusiasm.

=== Dax-Mauléon-Bayonne triangle ===
The Spanish spy Guevara reported on a Protestant attempt on 28 September to surprise Dax, which was administered by a Catholic governor, a certain Saint-Esteben. Early in the morning, seven-hundred Protestants gathered outside the city hoping to see the gates thrown open so that they might cut down the Catholics inside. To this end they were in league with some Protestants inside Dax to betray the place to them. The betrayal of Dax by insiders was uncovered, and Saint-Esteben saw to the informing of the Catholics inside the city, and the gates were kept shuttered. Meanwhile, information of this conspiracy was sent forward by Saint-Esteben to the seigneur de Monluc and Charles IX in the hopes they would send soldiers. Further, it was alleged that 1,500 Protestants from Bordeaux were making their way south to link up with those of Dax and others. The governor of Soulé, Belsunce, is to have learned of the failure of the Dax enterprise and warned the queen of Navarre. Such was the information Guevara provided to Philip on 1 October.

Belsunce's father had held the charge of governor of both Mauléon-Soulé and Dax. Brunet notes that these two places, alongside Bayonne, formed an important triangle for the holding of lower-Navarre, and the Spanish border more generally. Saint-Esteben, the new Catholic governor of Dax was the brother-in-law of the vicomte d'Orthe, the governor of Bayonne. Thus, for the queen of Navarre, two of the three places were now outside her control, and Brunet sees her hand in this coup attempt to reassert the majority position. Guevera saw the orders of Jeanne behind the enterprise.

In the interest of 'protecting' Jeanne's states, Charles removed Belsunce from the governorship of Mauléon-Soulé in favour of the comte de Luxe. The historian Brunet credits his receipt of this office to his father-in-law, the seigneur de Lanssac. By this means, the entire defensive triangle was put under Catholic control. The Catholic reconquest was thus enabled, as well as Spanish intrigues.

=== Périgord ===
In the Périgord, the rebel Protestants captured the cities of Sainte-Foy-la-Grande, Bergerac, Mussidan, and Lalinde. This accomplished they moved to link up with the northern army of the prince de Condé.

=== Rouergue ===
The Rouergue with the modern French départements overlayed

The Protestant held city of Millau in the Rouergue was isolated and thus relied on support from the cause in Languedoc. This had involved the forming of agreements with the comte de Crussol during the first French War of Religion by which Millau supported him financially and militarily in return for protection. With the coming of the second war, a similar arrangement was worked out with his successor at the head of the rebel party in Languedoc, his brother, the baron d'Acier. Millau would pay forward money to support Condé's mercenary reiters, totalling around 706 livres.

Millau was the preferred location for Protestant political assemblies in the Rouergue.

At the château de Pomayrols in the Rouergue, the Protestants looted the reliquaries and other metal objects on 15 February 1568.

=== Agenais ===
The Agenais with the modern French départements overlayed

In Agen, the Catholics moved quickly, asserting control over strategic offices, and preparing to war against the Protestant rebels. Monluc, at the direction of the crown, ordered the arrière-ban for the Agenais. Meanwhile, the governor of Agen, Lalande, established a rota of twenty-four consuls to supplement the night patrols. This was an evolution on the approach of 1562, when the gates had been vulnerable to surreptitious opening. Only those with appropriate identification, or who were vouched for by Catholic residents of Agen, were to be permitted into the city.

Lalande summoned together a military council and advised Monluc to mobilise the nobility of the Agenais. Monluc would record in his memoires how he duly undertook this, sending out two-hundred dispatches. The parlements of Bordeaux and Toulouse were appraised of these efforts.

==== Protestant offensive ====
The Protestants of Agen, rather than capturing their own city, went to support their coreligionists in Montauban. Across the Agenais, the Protestants enjoyed many easy successes: Bergerac, Montauban, Moissac, and Fronton all fell to them. Agen, Casteljaloux and Lectoure held firm for the royalist Catholics.

On 8 October, the assets of Protestants who had gone to support their coreligionists in Montauban and Bergerac were seized. Up to the end of the year, 1,178 livres was raised from the selling off of sequestered goods, with a further 1,014 livres from confiscated grain and wine. This was followed with a levy of 500 écus imposed on the wealthy Protestants of Agen two days later. The Protestant former official of Agen, Sevin, later alleged that the majority of these funds was diverted into the hands of the Catholic generals. The historian Gould challenges this though, noting that the records confirm a majority of the money having been used to strengthen Agen's defences.

By December, the Catholic leadership in Agen were flush in enough money to raise the garrison size of Agen by 80% and award a gift of 200 écus to the seigneur de Monluc.

With the war winding down in March 1568, elaborate shows of royal favour were made to various captains of the south at Agen Cathedral. Before the gathered leaders of the local Catholic party, and with Lalande and the seigneur de Monluc bestowing the awards, inductions into the Order of Saint-Michel were made on 9 March for Monluc's right hand man Tilladet (who would soon be made governor of Bordeaux by Monluc) and a pair of Monluc's captains (Laussan and Pausas). On 10 March, a further two captains were inducted, and then another three on 18 and 19 March. Processions, prayers, and Catholic pageantry accompanied these events.

=== Comminges ===
Monluc entrusted the Spanish Bardaxí (the liaison he used for his Spanish contacts) with raising 600 foot from the comté de Comminges and Asterac.

Commissions for captains were issued in Comminges in October and November 1567. Those captains then turned to the local nobility of Comminges to raise the soldiery, for example in 1567 the Bazordan family.

=== Other places ===
In Francescas, near Agen, a tax on the Protestant residents of the place allowed for the employ of a large Catholic garrison, which would keep the road from Agen to Béarn open. Only two months after the institution of this garrison, the Catholic administration of Francescas pled with Monluc to relieve them of the burden, asserting that the troops were a source of trouble in the city. They were compelled to offer that in return for being relieved of the garrison's presence, they would continue to raise the tax that had been levied to support its residence and forward the money on to Lalande in Agen.

A different problem faced Casteljaloux, with the Protestant residents responding to the punitive tax imposed on them by boycotting their contributions to the gages. This economic pressure forced a change of policy.

Saint-Antonin would follow Montauban's example in declaring a public holiday on news of the Protestant 'triumph' at Saint-Denis, with stores closed, psalms sang, and the word preached.

François de Salignac, the bishop of Sarlat, was captured by the Protestants, subsequently being released for a ransom of 4,000 livres.

== Auvergne, Forez and the Bourbonnais ==
=== Protestant campaign ===
In Auvergne, Forez and the Bourbonnais, the rebel Protestant movement was commanded by a certain seigneur de Ponsenat. He received letter from the prince de Condé ordering him to assume arms. Along with his fellow commander the seigneur de Verbelais he would boast 3,000 infantry and 500 cavalry.

In October, Poncenat and Verbelais began the march into Burgundy from the Bourbonnais, hoping to link up with the German mercenaries their allies had hired the services of. Having laid siege to Cluny on 29 October, they extorted the city of 6,000 livres in return for sparing the place. The sum was dutifully paid within the next few days in the form of silverware, and cloth.

=== Catholic forces ===
The bishop of Le Puy, Antoine de Sennetaire, participated in the war for the Catholic side.

The seigneur de La Valette was sent to the Bourbonnais so that he might contain the Protestant's advance in this region.

== Poitou, the Angoumois and Saintonge ==
=== Poitiers ===
There were concerns as to the safety of royalist held Poitiers during the war. In January 1568, the comte du Lude congratulated the authorities on their commitment to maintaining the city in loyalty to the crown, but warned them to be on their guard for those who held other ambitions.

=== Protestant campaign ===
In lower-Poitou, the Protestants took the offensive, breaking southwards into Saintonge. First in the manner of raids and exploratory attacks, before escalating to the seizure of the Île de Ré and Marans. In the former place, there were to be found a significant number of fortifications built by the inhabitants. These feats accomplished the Protestants, under the command of a certain Boisseau and Sauvage, moved on Luçon and Sainte-Gemme in the Vendée.

As they advanced, the population took shelter in the church of Luçon. Some royalist soldiers, under the command of a priest also slowed down the Protestant advance. Frustrated by the resistance, the Protestant commanders broke into the church and slaughtered everyone inside. Luçon was thus captured and looted. Approximately twenty Protestants then made for Sainte-Gemme, fighting with the Catholics there. A garrison dispatched from La Rochelle succeeded in saving Sainte-Gemme from sharing Luçon's fate.

The church of Cheffois was usurped for the Protestant cause, that of Rochetrejoux was put to the torch.

A Protestant army, under the command of the seigneur de La Rochefoucauld, numbering some 6,000 infantry and 2,000 cavalry was able to form up in Guyenne and Poitou.

=== Catholic offensive ===
In Mouilleron-en-Pareds, the sieur de La Roussière oversaw the arrest of a Protestant pastor. This proved to be the spark for pitched battles in the area which transpired from 30 November to 9 December.

In Fontenay and Pouzauges orders were issued for the seizure of Protestant property. These orders were met with counterstrokes.

=== Royal commission ===
With the Protestants on the offensive in Poitou and Limousin, the king entrusted the comte d'Escars with heading to the region. The king allowed Escars to extract his compagnie from the royal army to bring with him to the region, with Charles informing his brother Anjou on 3 February that he would be well aware of the need Escars had of it, and that he should provide it with all possible haste. In addition to tending to the security situation, Charles also told Anjou that he hoped that Escars might extract some money from the provinces.

The king's concern for the development of affairs in Poitou and Anjou only deepened as the days went on. On 10 February he wrote again to the duc d'Anjou on the subject. He asked that his brother permit the maréchal de Cossé, and his compagnie to make for the region. Charles was conscious the Brissac family (of which Cossé was a member) were well rooted in Anjou and thus this was an advantageous choice. He also asked that Anjou permit the chevalier de Monluc, son of the seigneur de Monluc, to join with his father, who had been tasked with reducing La Rochelle to obedience. He would be entrusted with the foot soldiers before the city of La Rochelle.

=== Angoulême ===
The Protestants succeeded in reducing Angoulême. The historian Vray notes that the city had a reputation for impregnability, and before this point had never been captured by military force. The city surrendered to the Protestants under terms, that the soldiers could leave under arms, and the gentlemen with their horses.

Condé established the seigneur de Saint-Memme as his governor for Angoulême.

== Limousin ==
The surprise of Meaux represented a blow for the lieutenant-general, and seneschal of Limousin, the comte d'Escars. He had affixed himself closely to the tolerant policy of the chancellor L'Hôpital, and enjoyed proximity with the house of Bourbon. His political survival going forward largely rested on his military capabilities.

The lieutenant-general and seneschal of Limousin, the comte d'Escars, was invested by Charles with the lieutenancy over the castellanies of Rancon, Champagnac and Périgord on 7 February 1568.

The village of Blond was devastated by the Protestant soldiery. After another episode similar to this in 1569, the village would look to fortify their church.

=== Périgord army ===
Having conquered various places in Périgord, the Protestant army of this region then made to move north to link up with Condé's army; in doing so they advanced through the west of the province of Limousin. By comparison, Limousin had been a bystander during the first French War of Religion.

While in the Limousin, the Protestants came to an agreement with the inhabitants of Saint-Junien, before capturing Le Dorat on 31 October. This latter place boasted a fortress that commanded the passage from the Limousin to Poitou, and Guyenne to Berry.

== Aunis ==
=== La Rochelle ===
With the outbreak of hostilities, Charles' cold approach to the baron de Jarnac's attempts to assert himself over the city of La Rochelle were reversed. The baron received orders to raise troops and march on La Rochelle. Orders were sent to the city's town council to receive him, and a levy of 3,000 livres was to be imposed on the city to cover the costs of the garrison’s return. There was hesitancy to obey these orders, with a gathering of the city's bourgeoisie arranged instead. The general mood was against the reception of foreign soldiers in their city. This defiance was bolstered when it was learned that the former mayor, Amateur Blandin, had converted to Catholicism a few days previous. Fears of a Catholic fifth column in the city rose.

The mayor, François Pontard, resolved to seize the moment. Pontard's noble cousin, the sieur de Saint-Hermine, had long been calling for him to align himself with the prince de Condé. Pontard now took the plunge. In addition to the religious fears, he was also driven by opposition to a royal garrison and outside interference in the institutions of La Rochelle.

==== Coup ====
On the morning of 9 January 1568, Pontard, at the head of a group of armed supporters, entered the streets with cries of 'To arms!'. With the city's militant faction at his back, the strong points of La Rochelle were occupied. Cannons were deployed to intimidate potential adversaries. Rumours swirled of a Catholic attack against the city, this proving the spark for the Protestants to sack the remaining Catholic churches in the city. The crowds stole the church plate, so that it might serve the Protestant war chest. Twenty-seven priests were rounded up and taken off into the dungeons of La Rochelle, while Pontard's captains visited the houses of the city's Catholics, and moderate Protestants from the town council, finding more candidates for imprisonment. The chaos of the takeover was the occasion for score settling, as in one episode that saw the bailiff of the présidial court killed by a colleague who erroneously accused him of opposing the coup. Radical Protestants murdered all the imprisoned priests, with the mutilated bodies tossed into the sea. The city would remain in Protestant hands until 1628.

==== Protestant administration ====
Pontard's local supporters defended the necessity of the coup as the only defence for the liberty of conscience in the city, their allegiance to the rebel prince de Condé for the broader liberties across the kingdom, as well as a preventative measure against the interference of foreigners in Rochelais affairs. As part of this process, the Catholics were expelled from the city.

Pontard established a special advisory council of eleven, drawn from the radical Protestants, which gave him permission to disobey the royal order to allow Jarnac's garrison entry. A week later, the council of La Rochelle deferred to Pontard control of the incomes of the city, as well as its weaponry. No sooner had this transpired, that Pontard reached out to Saint-Hermine to come and occupy the city. Saint-Hermine arrived on 23 January, bearing letters patent from Condé establishing him as military governor of La Rochelle. Those patricians who opposed Saint-Hermine's appointment were arrested. While the corps de ville recognised Saint-Hermine as governor, they baulked at him being made the next mayor of the city. By three secret ballots he was further refused the dignity of being a pair, a necessary prerequisite to assuming higher offices in La Rochelle.

The governor of La Rochelle for the Protestants, Saint-Hermine, looked to raise a loan of 60,000 livres in the city for the support of the rebel cause. Incomes from the royal domain, as well as excise taxes, were seized. Forced loans on the Catholic residents and Iberian merchants brought in money for a new fortification. Even tombstones were ripped up to serve as defensive materials. Labour gangs went through the suburbs levelling structures outside the city's walls, including Catholic churches. The son of Amateur Blandin, Jean, who had denounced Pontard's coup, was arrested, and soon found dead in custody. It was suspected that foul play, specifically poisoning, was involved.

A Protestant printer operating in La Rochelle, a certain Barthélemy Berton, who would grow to assume a dominant position in the rebel Protestant literature scene during the third civil war due to Orléans not being in rebel hands, would publish three works during the second civil war. The first justified the uprising of the city, another concerned the unrest in Marans, and the final concerned the Holy Roman Empire.

Frustrated with the Rochelais, Charles wrote to the city on 18 January 1568. His message was brought to the city by the sieur de Plessis. In this message, the king urged the Rochelais to give little credence to the idea their city was to be descended upon by bands of armed soldiers, or that their religious freedom was to be crushed. He urged them to have faith in Plessis as they would the person of the king, and maintain themselves in good obedience to the crown.

Pontard did not use his absolute power in La Rochelle to overturn the snubs by the La Rochelle government of Saint-Hermine, respecting the prerogatives of the town councillors against an outsider. As the historian Robbins puts it, La Rochelle's adherence to the rebel Protestant cause was not an undying one, but rather a 'protective association'. Unlike other great port cities the rebel Protestants had occupied in the past, such as Le Havre, the Protestants in La Rochelle enjoyed strong support from the hinterlands around the city.

==== Royalist siege ====
The lieutenant-general of Guyenne, the seigneur de Monluc was tasked with the recapture of La Rochelle, and to this end departed from the siege of Montauban he was undertaking. Without troops provided by the crown, Monluc looked to buy time in the endeavour, claiming the towns were not granting him the men and cannons he required for such an undertaking. Indeed, Robbins affirms that Monluc was rebuffed at every turn in his quest for men, money, and arms. According to Monluc, little eagerness for the mission was to be found in Bordeaux, Agen or Toulouse.

On 27 February, Charles assured the population of La Rochelle that it was his wish to see his edicts obeyed, and that he hoped the authorities of the city would do their part to maintain peace. Monluc continued in his procrastinations, pleading ill health, and by March had still not invested the city. By this time, he was cognizant negotiations between the crown and the Protestant leadership were transpiring.

Pontard and Saint-Hermine conspired to delay word of the peace of Longjumeau from arriving in La Rochelle.

== Brittany ==
In Brittany, a certain seigneur de Montejean raised troops for the Protestants. The number of which, and their purpose are unknown.

=== Nantes ===
Shortly after the surprise of Meaux, in October, word of the events arrived in Nantes, and the Protestants were forced to leave the city, the community making for nearby Blain. The Protestant goods, such as beds and linens were requisitioned for the needs of the expanded château garrison. Inside Nantes itself, order and obedience to the crown was maintained.

The municipality was keen to avoid the oversight of royal officials like captain Sanzay and thus moved to organise mandatory guard duty be conducted in a session of 12 October 1567. The gates would be guarded by three leading inhabitants of Nantes, and chains were installed that could be raised across the roads in case of attack. Further, one-hundred dragoons would be raised for the defence of Nantes, at the municipality’s expense.

The crown ordered Sanzay to see to the raising of two-hundred infantry as a garrison for Nantes. These would also be raised at the city's expense. This aroused the frustration of the militia captains, who complained that they were keeping watch, but also paying 4,000 livres for a garrison. A petition was sent to the vicomte de Martigues, who agreed to discharge the soldiers on the condition the city militia would fill the void fully.

In 1568, on the instruction of the vicomte de Martigues and seigneur de Bouillé, the militia conducted house to house visits to determine religion, weapons, and dignity of the residents.

At the order of the governor, a survey of the city's fortifications was carried out in February 1568. Those houses built against the walls of the city were to be demolished, the ditches cleared, and an earthwork built around the Marchix. The city dragged its feet on implementing these recommendations.

To cover the garrison costs, and Martigues' extraordinary demands, a general assembly of March 1568 resolved to raise up to 15,000 livres of which 5,000 would be levied on the Nantais, with the rest loaned at interest from the clergy and bourgeois.

== Anjou ==
=== Angers ===
Writing to the duc d'Anjou (brother of king Charles and future military commander of the royalist forces) in September, the aldermen of Angers requested he allow them to preserve their military autonomy. They also appraised the duc d'Anjou of a 'sinister Protestant plot' they were aware of and asked that he permit them to arm as many bourgeois as they felt necessary. The importance of the château d'Angers for the defence of the city was recognised by their request, but in such a way as to suggest that Anjou, as its overlord, should support its upkeep with his own incomes, rather than looking to the city to do so.

Around the same time, the mayor of Angers wrote to various Angevin nobles, the maréchal de Vielleville, the comte de Brissac and maréchal de Cossé among others. He hoped that these men could send their own troops as a counterbalance to the reliance on 'foreign' (i.e. non-Angevin) nobles that the French crown had imposed on Angers and its château since 1560. Further, that they might shield Angers from tax burdens. It was also requested of these men that they lend their voices to the request of the aldermen to the duc d'Anjou.

The breakdown of peace embodied by the surprise of Meaux and the battle of Saint-Denis had increased the demands made by the governor of Angers, Puygaillard on the city. He tried to extract a 'gift' from the aldermen of Angers but was met with opposition. The notables of Angers appealed to the French crown against their governor, the mayor and the procureur du roi (king's attorney in Angers). They stated that they could no longer support the financial burdens Puygaillard was imposing on them, under various pretexts. The king would later in October 1568 grant Angers satisfaction, prohibiting Puygaillard, the mayor and the procureur from raising new sums from the populace absent the king's approval.

==== Collapse of Puygaillard's government ====
In October 1567, Puygaillard, who had founded a Catholic League in Anjou in 1567, thereby demonstrating his unsuitability to handle Catholic Protestant relations, was replaced as governor of Angers and Anjou by a Angevin member of the noblesse seconde: the seigneur de Vassé. Vassé was a fixture of the Angevin nobility, whose name could soothe potential tensions. He also had experience of governing from the days of the Italian Wars when he had been entrusted with the government of Piedmont and Saluzzo. It could not be said that he was not a rigorous Catholic, having been a member of Puygaillard's League, but unlike Puygaillard, he could ensure the obedience of the Angevin nobility. For control of the château d'Angers, Puygaillard was replaced with another local grandee, the comte de Brissac, son of the late maréchal de Brissac. The comte de Brissac had recently been appointed premier panetier du roi (first baker of the king) and grand fauconnier (grand falconer) by the crown. In such royal favour, Brissac would be able to intervene in favour of the Angevin nobility at court. Brissac was also very popular in Angers, thus offering the possibility of easing tension between the château and city.

==== New administration ====
The new governor, Vassé, began his administration with a blunder. He was convinced the Protestants of the city would seek to replicate their coup to seize Angers as they had done in 1562. He therefore attempted to get all Protestants expelled from Angers and was convinced the elite of Angers would support him in this move. The aldermen of the city saw in this move an attempt to erode their civic liberties. The aldermen counter proposed that the Protestants be compelled to give an oath of loyalty, that they have their weapons taken from them, and that they be subject to a curfew.

On 18 October 1567, Charles presented to the city council of Angers a plan for the improvement of the city's fortifications. The garrison of the château would be augmented by forty soldiers, paid for by the crown. However, burdens would also be placed on Angers for this, three hundred men, under the command of two bourgeois, were to be raised as a militia. Further, a gentleman of the city would have command of fort mounted arquebusiers. By these measures, the financial burden on Angers would be increased, due to the new soldiery they would be paying for, the power of the captain of the château would be supplemented as his garrison increased, and royal power in the city would be cemented through the mounted arquebusiers. The council baulked at this proposal, refusing to execute its provisions, and simultaneously begging the crown not to send foreign troops into their city, arguing they could look after their own defence. This argument would be a continual refrain of the city council throughout the Autumn of 1567.

A few weeks later, at the start of November, the mayor complained to the council of the injury and insult he had been subject to due to his lack of protection, something that dishonoured him. He thus requested he be granted a personal guard, something the aldermen were happy to offer their assent to. Through this act, the idea of urban self-defence was furthered, and the mayor put himself on more equal footing with the governor of Angers.

==== Internal disagreement ====
In December, Vassé entered into dispute with the judge of the provost court, Jean Bonvoisin. He released from prison a certain Baudriller, who had been put there by Bonvoisin. Vassé's soldiers, and the sergeants of the court came to blows in the affair.

On 24 January 1568, Bonvoisin presented to the council a commission for him from Charles to lead three-hundred troops for the maintenance of order in Angers. This was contrary to the power of Vassé, and also disquieted the aldermen, who saw Bonvoisin as sympathetic to Protestantism. Bonvoisin was compelled to drop the matter at a town hall meeting of 27 January.

==== Return of Puygaillard ====
When Blois fell to the Protestants a few weeks later, Vassé seized on the episode, which had seen many Catholics flee from Tours to Angers. On 19 February, Bonvoisin and one of his colleagues, the avocat du roi was imprisoned on the grounds they had conspired against the security of Angers. This was a further slap in the face to the prerogatives of the aldermen, who baulked at the arrest. Thus, by 23 February, Bonvoisin was released from his imprisonment. Vassé turned out to be a weaker force in Angers than had his predecessor, and the support he received from the crown, little desirous to alienate the aldermen of Angers so completely, was weak.

By 10 February, it was resolved to have Vassé dismissed from his post. Catherine wrote to the duc d'Anjou, who was in the field, to explain that Charles desired to see the maréchal de Cossé installed in the charges that Vassé had occupied. This was in the hopes he would be a better figure of reconciliation (and thus royal authority) than the latter had proved to be. Vassé would resist his dismissal, and it would not be until the arrival of the maréchal de Vielleville in Angers, after the end of the war in July, that he withdrew from the position of governor of Angers.

Though Cossé had been floated by the crown, it would turn out to be a different man who was appointed to govern Anjou in February 1568, another Angevin noble named the seigneur de Brézé. In a letter to the duc d'Anjou, Catherine noted that he would be granted the role of governor of Anjou, governor of Angers and governor of the château d'Angers. He would not in fact be granted the role of governor of Angers, the failure of Vassé in the charge having convinced the crown that an outside noble was needed for the city. Thus, a month after the Bonvoisin arrest debacle, Puygaillard was re-appointed to the charge of governor of Angers, entering the city on 29 March 1568, a few weeks after the end of the war.

== Touraine ==
=== Tours ===
No sooner had war broken out, than Protestants began to flee from Tours, many of them never to return. The Catholics of the city were more excited about the prospect of buying the abandoned property than making defensive plans for the city.

Tours was obliged to welcome Catholic refugees from Protestant seized Orléans.

On 1 January 1568, trouble broke out at the Maillé prêche (the nearby site of Protestant worship to Tours). Rather than stopping the violence, the priority for the municipality was to explain it to the king. To this end they employed Charles' confessor, Guillaume Ruzé. Charles was unimpressed by Tours.

==== Return of the Protestant army ====
As the Protestant army looked like it might return to Orléans, and from there menace Touraine, the royalist cause in the province was entrusted to the son of the duc de Montpensier, the prince dauphin d'Auvergne. To support d'Auvergne, Charles requested that the duc d'Anjou (commander of the royal army, and Charles's brother) peel off the company of a certain sieur de Bastresse from his army and dispatch it to Touraine.

This was important as these places were currently poor in defence. Having been made aware that losing this company would be to compromise the strength of Anjou's army, the king proposed the next day that instead the baron de Mortemart's company be dispatched.

With the Protestants besieging Blois in February 1568, Tours felt threatened. Nevertheless, the garrison of the city, under a certain sieur de La Borderie was resented by the populace and enjoyed little in the way of support.

== Orléanais ==
=== Orléans ===
The Protestant commander La Noue took Orléans by surprise on 28 September with a force of three-hundred horsemen. He enjoyed the support of the Protestant population of the city in this enterprise, they having been warned of the coming assault by the bailli (bailiff) Jérôme Groslot. The city resumed its role as a capital for the Protestant cause, with soldiers converging there from the various provinces of the kingdom. François de Boucard raised a loan of 30,000 livres among the Protestants of Orléans.

==== Polemic ====
With the recapture of Orléans, the Protestant printing press of Eloi Gibier was free to start running again. However, the Protestant army was forced to be significantly more mobile than during the first war, only halting in Orléans around February 1568. In addition to this, the other great Protestant printing centres of Caen and Lyon were not in rebel hands. This changed the character of production for rebel literature. Eloi Gibier would publish twenty-five works from Orléans, the remainder of works published lack printer name or location.

A few months into the war, Gibier collated ten polemical Protestant works into a single piece, to provide an overview to Protestant readers. This work, entitled Les Requestes, protestations, remonstrances & advertissemens faits par Monseigneur le prince de Condé. These works likely were published separately beforehand, though no individual copies of some of them survive.

Shortly after the coming of peace, Gibier published a larger compilation, entitled Recuiel de toutes les choses mémorables. This work compiled twenty-one works published during the war, the bulk of Gibier's output. Daussy places it in the lineage of the earlier Lyon works by Jean Saugrain published in 1564.

The polemicist François Hotman set up shop in Orléans in October 1567. It is possible he wrote propaganda for Condé during the war.

Of the named authors for works written during the war, there are Etienne Valancier, a poet who became secretary to the comte de La Rochefoucauld after the battle of Saint-Denis. He was to be found in Orléans in March 1568. He wrote a eulogy to Charlotte de Roye, recently deceased wife of the admiral de Coligny. The other named author, Michel Boucher de Boiscommun, would publish a harangue to the soldiers of the prince de Condé, with a translation of the Moses canticle supplemented to the work.

==== Protestant regime ====
The new Protestant regime committed atrocities in Orléans, including causing the collapse of part of the city's cathedral.

=== Chartres ===
At the outbreak of civil war, on 29 September, the sieur de Fontaine-la-Guyon was appointed governor of Chartres. Aside from his cavalry company, the city was devoid of regular troops. With word having arrived of Orléans’ fall to the Protestants, the civic government of Chartres became conscious that they required more soldiers for their defence, and they petitioned the crown to raise companies of troops at their own expense.

On 17 October, the crown permitted the raising of four companies of three-hundred men each under the governor's command.

==== Municipality against governor ====
This began conflict between the civic government and the governor, with the town requesting the companies be reduced to two-hundred persons a piece, which Fontaine-la-Guyon resisted. On 24 October, Charles assented to the reduction in size, and the first muster took place two days later.

On 21 October, a column of royal cavalry under the command of Chavigny and Montpezat passed through Chartres. The city was ordered to provide 1,500 loaves of bread among other supplies to provision the army for three days. There would be conflict between the column and the people of Chartres.

A mixed column of cavalry, and infantry under the vicomte de Martigues passed through Chartres on 17 November. This force was larger, totalling around 3,000 soldiers. Again, Chartres was required to provision the men with supplies.

Soldiers took oats from the storeroom by force. The guide the city had provided to take the column to its next stop was robbed by the column, and Chartres was left with thousands of unconsumed loaves of bread the soldiers had not eaten.

==== Winding down ====
After the royal army and the Protestant force moved away eastwards in December, the town council of Chartres looked to get their garrison wound down in strength by two companies. Fontaine-la-Guyon complained that they were meddling in military matters. Both the council and governor came in for admonishments from the royal council, which urged them to reconcile. The reduction was signed off on, and during mid-January, with the Protestants outside the kingdom, it was further reduced to a single company.

==== Ramping up ====
A column under the command of the Italian mercenary Sarra de Martinengo arrived in Chartres on 25 January. He had with him around 2,000 men, primarily infantry, though with several companies of pioneers. He was under orders to leave parts of his column in Chartres, now that the conflict was once more moving Chartres' way. The rest was to move on to Janville where they might screen Orléans. In defiance of royal order Martinengo kept his entire column in Chartres, and the town council and the governor complained to the crown. Fontaine-la-Guyon feuded with Martinengo and the soldiers, unpaid, were increasingly restless.

Martinengo wrote to Catherine on 27 January to explain he had not progressed for fear his column might be preyed upon by Protestant cavalry. He protested that the population resented the presence of his men, who needed some rest, and who he had promised would be paid before their departure. The sieur de La Trémoille, lieutenant-general of the Orléanais, was sent with his gendarme company to mediate the dispute. He was able to negotiate the departure of most of Martinengo's soldiers by 5 February. Though before agreeing to depart, the soldiers demanded large quantities of bread, wine, and powder.

Grateful to be rid of the soldiers, a gift of 283 livres was voted for La Trémoille for the maintenance of his cavalry company. Martinengo's company had cost the city more than 2,300 livres.

It was now clear that the Protestants were making for Orléans. The duc d'Anjou therefore began planning for Chartres' defence. On 7 February, he ordered Jean de Monluc and his company of Gascons (which was in Villeneuve and Joigny) to march for Montargis, and from there on to Chartres. He was to be followed by another regiment under the comte de Cerny.

==== Siege of Chartres ====
On 12 February, Anjou gave order to the sieur de Linières to move on from Chaumont, where he was with his gendarme company, to assume command of Chartres. Fontaine-la-Guyon protested the usurpation of his authority. That same day, Jean de Monluc was ordered to leave his men, and head for Guyenne where his father was ill. Command in his place was taken by the sieur d'Ardelay.

Ardelay arrived at Chartres on 19 February. So rowdy were the soldiers, they were refused entry driving them off with warning shots. Encamped outside the town they were preyed on by Protestant cavalry. Reports were also arriving that the Protestant artillery train was in Orléans. Charles ordered Chartres to receive Ardelay and his men on 22 February, and the municipality consented, though Ardelay was obliged to first swear an oath that he would not pursue the righting of any wrongs he had suffered.

Linières arrived on 24 February, finding the place in chaos thanks to the Gascons that had already arrived. He was followed by the comte de Cerny on 26 February, the final reinforcements to make it into the city before the Protestant siege began.

On 30 March, with peace a few weeks in the past, the sieur de Linières wrote to Charles IX to announce the arrival of deputies from the city who would recount the recent siege the city had suffered. The main objective of the deputies was to object to the fiscal burdens the city had suffered during the recent Protestant siege. They wished to levy a tax to pay off their debts. The burden of the soldiery that Chartres had played host to was severe, 11,000 troops having passed through or been stationed in Chartres over the course of the war. The city calculated the cost they suffered at 87,801 livres, and this was not to include the damages to nearby villages the Protestants had sacked or damage to private individuals in Charters. The soldiers lingered in Chartres into April, and the city was compelled to borrow 9,000 livres from a Parisian financier to cover their shortfalls so that the troops might finally depart.

== Sources ==
- Baumgartner, Frederic (1986). Change and Continuity in the French Episcopate: The Bishops and the Wars of Religion 1547-1610.
- Benedict, Philip (2003). Rouen during the Wars of Religion. Cambridge University Press.
- Bernstein, Hilary (2004). Between Crown and Community: Politics and Civic Culture in Sixteenth-Century Poitiers. Cornell University Press.
- Boltanski, Ariane (2006). Les ducs de Nevers et l'État royal: genèse d'un compromis (ca 1550 - ca 1600). Librairie Droz.
- Boucher, Jacqueline (1998). "Monluc". In Jouanna, Arlette; Boucher, Jacqueline; Biloghi, Dominique; Le Thiec, Guy (eds.). Histoire et Dictionnaire des Guerres de Religion.
- Bourquin, Laurent (1994). Noblesse Seconde et Pouvoir en Champagne aux XVIe et XVIIe Siècles. Éditions de la Sorbonne.
- Bourquin, Laurent (2001). Les Nobles, La Ville, et Le Roi: L'Autorité Nobilaire en Anjou Pendant les Guerres de Religion. Belin.
- Brunet, Serge (2017). «De l'Espagnol dedans le Ventre!»: Les Catholiques du Sud-Ouest de La France face à La Réforme (vers 1540–1589) Tome 1. Honoré Champion.
- Brunet, Serge (2023). "Jeanne d'Albret, Pierre d'Albret, Évêque de Comminges, et la «Trahison» de Blaise de Monluc. Aux Origines de la Ligue dans le Sud-Ouest de la France". In Berriot-Salvadore, Evelyne; Chareyre, Philippe; Martin-Ulrich, Claudie (eds.). Jeanne d'Albret et sa Cour.
- Cassan, Michel (1996). Le Temps des Guerres de Religion: Le Case du Limousin (vers 1530 - vers 1630). Publisud.
- Champion, Pierre (1939). Charles IX: La France et le Controle de l'Espagne (Tome 1). Grasset.
- Champion, Pierre (1941). La Jeunesse de Henri III (1551 – 1571). Grasset.
- Chareyre, Philippe; Daussy, Hugues (2024). "Les Assemblées et le Système Politique Huguenot (1562-1598)". In Charere, Philippe; Daussy, Hugues (eds.). La France Huguenote: Histoire Institutionnelle d'une Minorité Religieuse (XVIe-XVIIIe Siècle). Presses Universitaires de Rennes.
- Christin, Olivier (1997). La Paix de Religion: L'Autonomisation de la Raison Politique au XVIe Siècle. Seuil.
- Cloulas, Ivan (1979). Catherine de Médicis. Fayard.
- Conner, Philip (2000). Huguenot Heartland: Montauban during the French Wars of Religion. University of St. Andrews.
- Crété, Liliane (1985). Coligny. Fayard.
- Daussy, Hugues (2015). Le Parti Huguenot: Chronique d'une Désillusion (1557-1572). Droz.
- Daussy, Hugues (2024a). "Les Assemblées et le Système Politique Huguenot (1562-1598)". In Charere, Philippe; Daussy, Hugues (eds.). La France Huguenote: Histoire Institutionnelle d'une Minorité Religieuse (XVIe-XVIIIe Siècle). Presses Universitaires de Rennes.
- Daussy, Hugues (2024b). "L'Organisation Militaire du Parti Huguenot (1562-1598)". In Charere, Philippe; Daussy, Hugues (eds.). La France Huguenote: Histoire Institutionnelle d'une Minorité Religieuse (XVIe-XVIIIe Siècle). Presses Universitaires de Rennes.
- Daussy, Hugues (2024c). "Les Chambres de Justice". In Charere, Philippe; Daussy, Hugues (eds.). La France Huguenote: Histoire Institutionnelle d'une Minorité Religieuse (XVIe-XVIIIe Siècle). Presses Universitaires de Rennes.
- Dauvin, Antoine (2021). Un Mythe de Concorde Urbaine?: le Corps de Ville de Caen, le Gouverneur et le Roi durant les Guerres de Religion (1557-1594). Normandie Université.
- Davies, Joan (1979). "Persecution and Protestantism: Toulouse 1562-1575". The Historical Journal. 22 1.
- Diefendorf, Barbara (1985). "Prologue to a Massacre: Popular Unrest in Paris 1555-1572". The American Historical Review. 90 5.
- Diefendorf, Barbara (1991). Beneath the Cross: Catholics and Huguenots in Sixteenth Century Paris. Oxford University Press.
- Duvauchelle, Christine (2023). "Assaut de Nîmes dans la nuit du 30 Septembre au 1er Octobre 1567". Les Guerres de Religion 1559-1610: La Haine des Clans. In Fine Éditions d'art.
- Gal, Stéphane (2000). Grenoble au Temps de la Ligue: Étude Politique, Sociale et Religieuse d'une Cité en Crise (vers 1562 - vers 1598). Presses Universitaires de Grenoble.
- Garrisson-Estèbe, Janine (1980). Protestants du Midi 1559-1598. Privat.
- Gould, Kevin (2016). Catholic Activism in South-West France 1540-1570. Routledge.
- Harding, Robert (1978). Anatomy of a Power Elite: the Provincial Governors in Early Modern France. Yale University Press.
- Holt, Mack (2020). The Politics of Wine in Early Modern France: Religion and Popular Culture in Burgundy 1477-1630. Cambridge University Press.
- Jouanna, Arlette (1998). "Le Temps des Guerres de Religion en France (1559-1598)". In Jouanna, Arlette; Boucher, Jacqueline; Biloghi, Dominique; Le Thiec, Guy (eds.). Histoire et Dictionnaire des Guerres de Religion.
- Kaiser, Wolfgang (1992). Marseille au Temps des Troubles: Morphologie Sociale et Luttes de Factions 1559 – 1596. Translated by Chaix, Florence. Éditions de l'École des Hautes Études en Sciences Sociales.
- Kingdon, Robert M. (1967). Geneva and the French Protestant Movement 1564-1572: A Contribution to the History of Congreationalism, Presbyterianism, and Calvinist Resistance Theory. Librairie Droz.
- Konnert, Mark (1997). Civic Agendas & Religious Passion: Châlons-sur-Marne during the French Wars of Religion 1560-1594. Sixteenth Century Journal Publishers Inc.
- Konnert, Mark (2006). Local Politics in the French Wars of Religion: The Towns of Champagne, the Duc de Guise and the Catholic League 1560-1595. Ashgate.
- Labourdette, Jean François (2013). Charles IX et la Puissance Espagnole: Diplomatie et Guerres Civiles (1563–1574). Honoré Champion.
- Labourdette, Jean François (2018). Charles IX, un Roi dans la Tourmente des Guerres Civiles (1560 – 1574). Honoré Champion.
- Leclerc Lafage, Valérie (2010). Montpellier au Temps des Troubles de Religion: Pratiques Testamentaires et Confessionnalisation (1554–1622). Honoré Champion.
- Le Roux, Nicolas (2000). La Faveur du Roi: Mignons et Courtisans au Temps des Derniers Valois. Champ Vallon.
- Le Roux, Nicolas (2022). 1559-1629 Les Guerres de Religion. Gallimard.
- Miquel, Pierre (1980). Les Guerres de Religion. Fayard.
- Neuschel, Kristen (1989). Word of Honor: Interpreting Noble Culture in Sixteenth-Century France. Cornell University Press.
- Nicholls, David (1994). "Protestants Catholics and Magistrates in Tours 1562-1572: The Making of a Catholic City during the Religious Wars". French History. 8 1.
- Nicoll, David (2020). Noble Identity during the French Wars of Religion: Antoine de Crussol, the duc d'Uzès. University of Warwick.
- Pailhès, Claudine (2022). Les Comtes de Foix: Des Pyrénées au Trône de France XIe-XVIe Siècle. Éditions Loubatières.
- Pernot, Michel (2013). Henri III: Le Roi Décrié. Éditions de Fallois.
- Pitts, Vincent (2012). Henri IV of France: His Reign and Age. Johns Hopkins University Press.
- Potter, David (1997). The French Wars of Religion: Selected Documents. Palgrave Macmillan.
- Potter, David (2021). The French Wars of Religion in France, 1559-1598: A History in Documents. unpublished.
- Robbins, Kevin (1997). City on the Ocean Sea: La Rochelle, 1530-1650 Urban Society, Religion and Politics on the French Atlantic Frontier. Brill.
- Roberts, Penny (1996). A City in Conflict: Troyes during the French Wars of Religion. Manchester University Press.
- Roberts, Penny (2013). Peace and Authority during the French Religious Wars c.1560-1600. Palgrave Macmillan.
- Souriac, Pierre-Jean (2008). Une Guerre Civile: Affrontements Religieux et Militaires dans Le Midi Toulousain (1562-1596). Champ Vallon.
- Souriac, Pierre-Jean (2023). "Se Battre sur les Frontières Confessionnelles: Le Sud du Royaume de France en Guerre Civile". In Le Roux, Nicolas (ed.). Les Guerres de Religion: Une Histoire de l'Europe au XVIe Siècle. Passés Composés.
- Sournia, Jean-Charles (1981). Blaise de Monluc: Soldat et Écrivain (1500-1577). Fayard.
- Tievant, Claude (1993). Le Gouverneur de Languedoc Pendant Les Premières Gueurres de Religion (1559 – 1574): Henri de Montmorency-Damville. Publisud.
- Tingle, Elizabeth C. (2006). Authority and Society in Nantes during the French Wars of Religion, 1559-1598. Manchester University Press.
- Thompson, James (1909). The Wars of Religion in France 1559-1576: The Huguenots, Catherine de Medici and Philip II. Chicago University Press.
- Tulchin, Allan (2010). That Men Would Praise the Lord: The Triumph of Protestantism in Nîmes 1530-1570. Oxford University Press.
- Venard, Marc (1993). Réforme Protestante, Réforme Catholique dans la Province d'Avignon - XVIe Siècle -. Cerf.
- Vester, Matthew (2012). Renaissance Dynasticism and Apanage Politics: Jacques de Savoie-Nemours 1531-1585. Truman State University Press.
- Vray, Nicole (1997). La Guerre des Religions dans la France de l'Ouest: Poitou-Aunis-Saintonge 1534-1610. Geste Éditions.
- Wanegffelen, Thierry (2005). Catherine de Médicis: Le Pouvoir au Fémenin. Payot & Rivages.
- Wood, James (2002). The Kings Army: Warfare, Soldiers and Society during the Wars of Religion in France, 1562-1576. Cambridge University Press.
