= Rieux Cathedral =

Roman Catholic church in Rieux-Volvestre, France

Coordinates: 43°15′30″N 1°12′12″E

Rieux Cathedral Cathédrale de la Nativité-de-Marie de Rieux
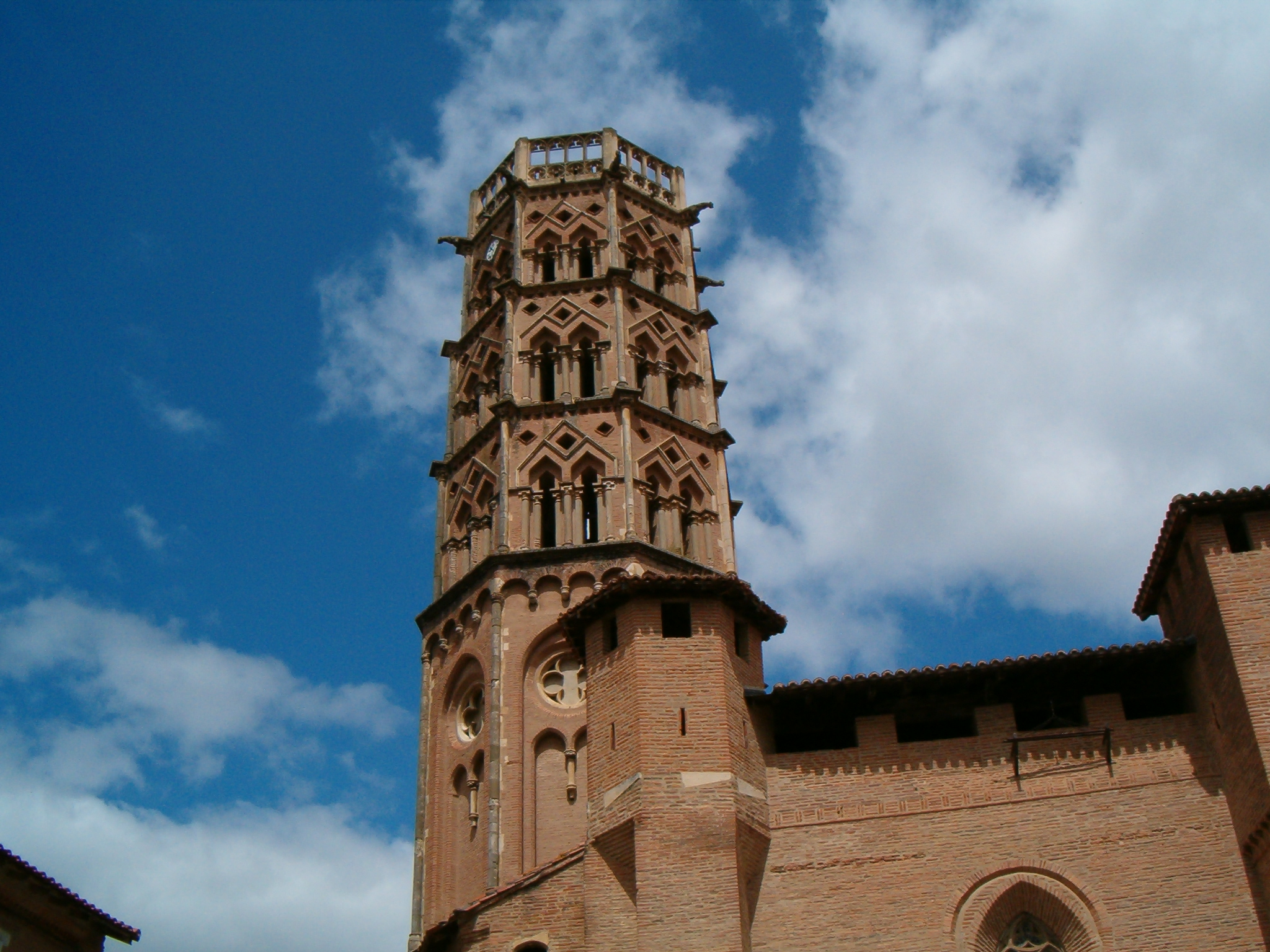
- Rieux Cathedral

Religion
- Affiliation: Roman Catholic Church
- Province: Bishopric of Rieux
- Region: Rieux-Volvestre
- Rite: Roman
- Ecclesiastical or organisational status: Cathedral
- Status: Active

Location
- Location: Rieux, France
- Interactive map of Rieux Cathedral; Cathédrale de la Nativité-de-Marie de Rieux

Architecture
- Type: church
- Style: Southern French Gothic

Rieux Cathedral (French: Cathédrale de la Nativité-de-Marie de Rieux) is a Roman Catholic church located in the town of Rieux-Volvestre, France. It has been listed since 1923 as a monument historique by the French Ministry of Culture.

The cathedral was formerly the seat of the Bishopric of Rieux, founded in 1317 and de-established by the Concordat of 1801.
