= Rieux-Volvestre =

- Commune
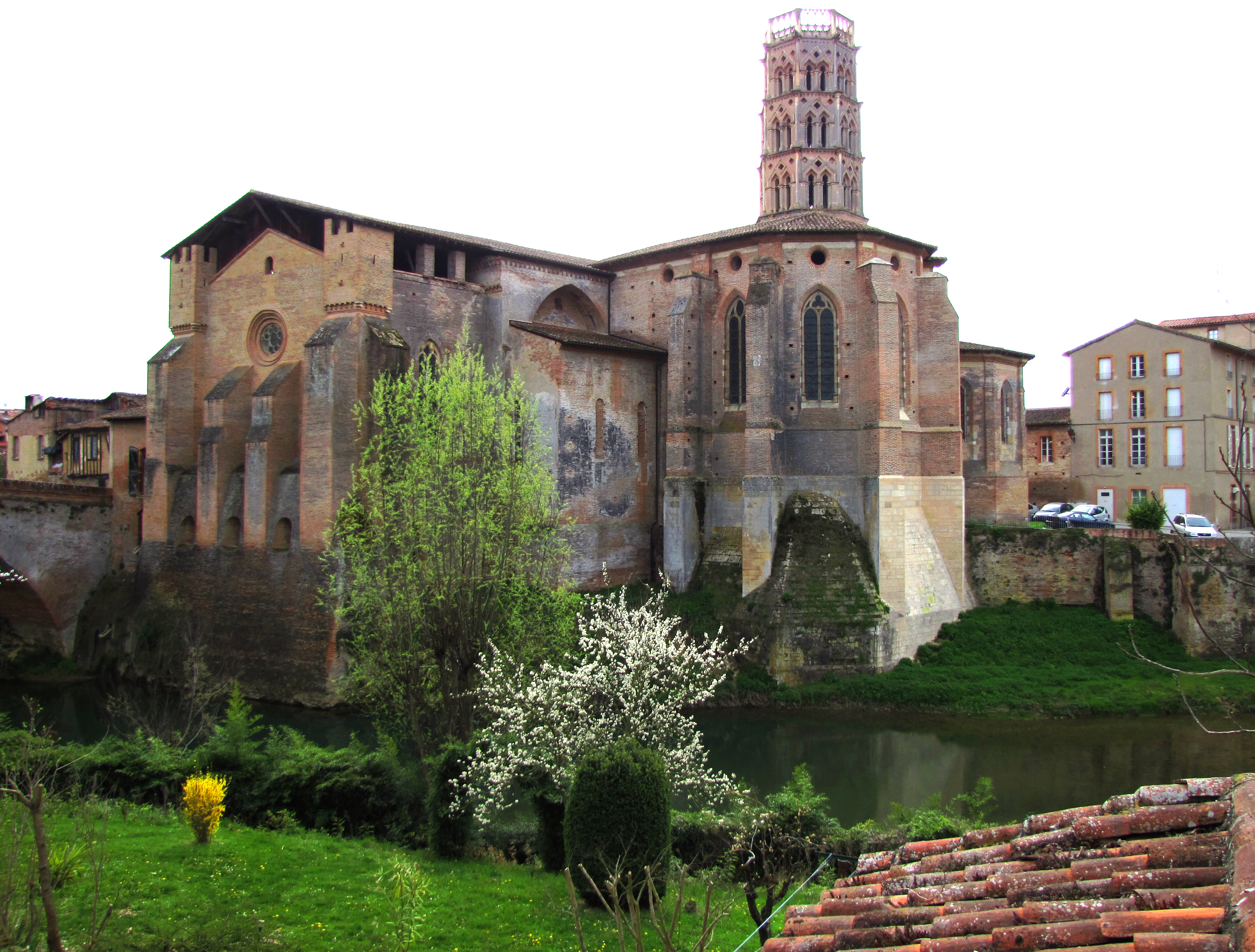
- Former Rieux Cathedral

- Coat of arms
- Location of Rieux-Volvestre
- Location within France Location within Occitanie
- Coordinates: 43°15′30″N 1°11′53″E
- Country: France
- Region: Occitania
- Department: Haute-Garonne
- Arrondissement: Muret
- Canton: Auterive
- Intercommunality: Volvestre

Government
  - Mayor (2020–2026): Maryse Vezat Baronia
- Area^{1}: 32.38 km^{2} (12.50 sq mi)
- Elevation: 236 m (774 ft)
- Highest elevation: 343 m (1,125 ft)
- Lowest elevation: 195 m (640 ft)
- Population (2023): 2,639
  - Density: 81.50/km^{2} (211.1/sq mi)
- Time zone: UTC+01:00 (CET)
  - Summer (DST): UTC+02:00 (CEST)
- INSEE/Postal code: 31455 /31310
- ^{1} French Land Register data, which excludes lakes, ponds, glaciers > 1 km^{2} (0.386 sq mi or 247 acres) and river estuaries.

Rieux-Volvestre (before June 2009: Rieux; French pronunciation: [ʁjø vɔlvɛstʁ]; Occitan: Rius) is a commune in Haute-Garonne department in southwestern France. Prior to 2009, it was known as Rieux.

== History ==
Rieux Cathedral, which is located here, was the seat of the Ancien Régime diocese of Rieux, created in 1317 and dissolved in 1790.

In 1560, Rieux-Volvestre was the site of the trial of Arnaud du Tilh, in the Martin Guerre case of imposture.

The commune of Rieux was renamed to Rieux-Volvestre in 2009, which is written by a decision.

== Population ==
The inhabitants of the commune are known as Rivois or Rivoises.

Historical population
| Year | Pop. | ±% p.a. |
|---|---|---|
| 1968 | 1,194 | — |
| 1975 | 1,243 | +0.58% |
| 1982 | 1,462 | +2.35% |
| 1990 | 1,721 | +2.06% |
| 1999 | 1,899 | +1.10% |
| 2007 | 2,352 | +2.71% |
| 2012 | 2,595 | +1.99% |
| 2017 | 2,583 | −0.09% |
| 2023 | 2,639 | +0.36% |
Source: INSEE

== Twin towns ==
Rieux-Volvestre is twinned with:

- Font-rubí, Spain

== See also ==
- Communes of the Haute-Garonne department
