= Ancient Diocese of Rieux =

Roman Catholic diocese in France (1317 - 1801)

Coordinates: 43.2583°N 1.2033°E

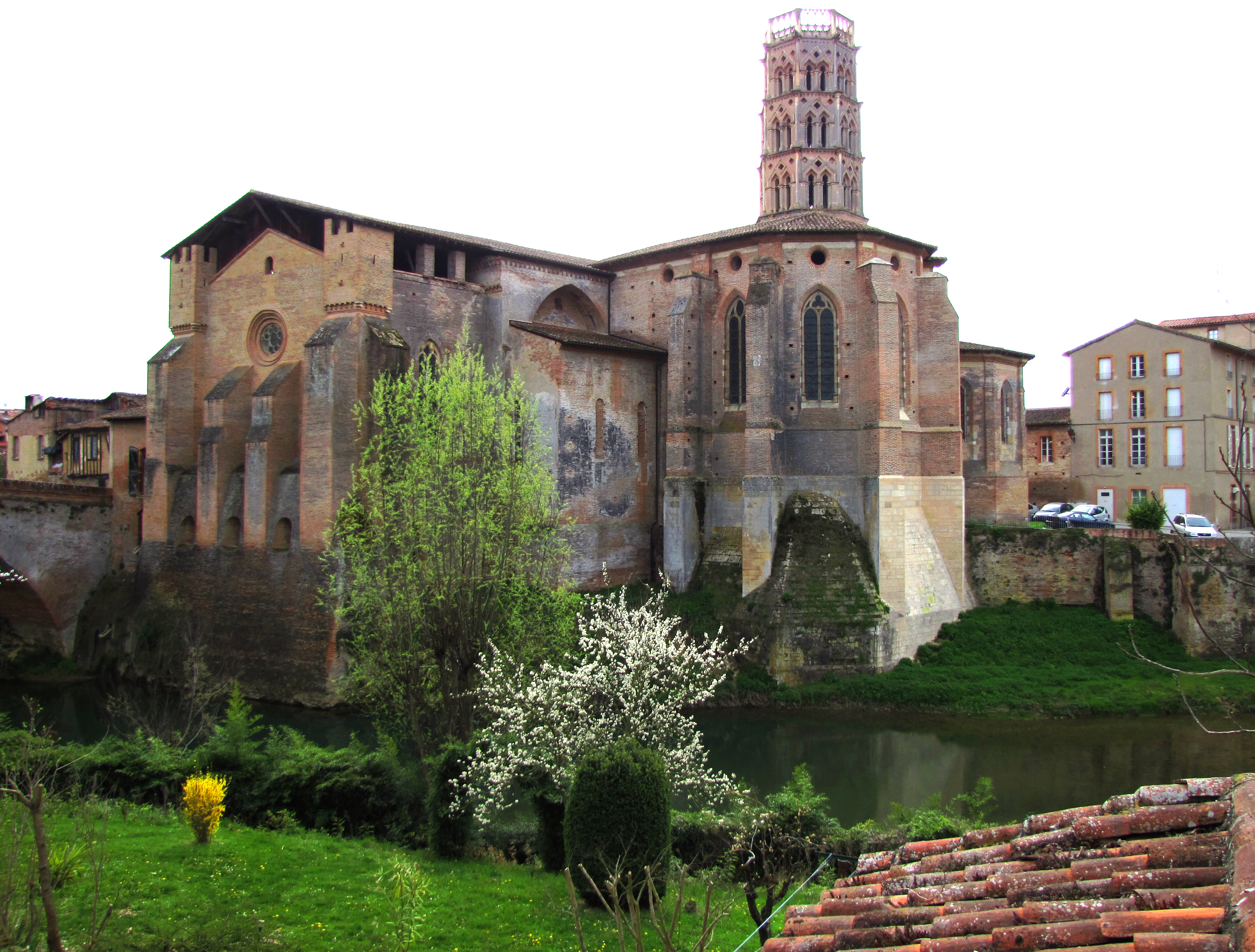
Rieux Cathedral

The former French Catholic diocese of Rieux existed from 1317 until the French Revolution. It was based at Rieux-Volvestre, south-west France, in the modern department of Haute-Garonne.

It was erected by Pope John XXII, as suffragan to the archiepiscopal See of Toulouse.

== Bishops ==
- Pelfort de Rabastens (1317-1320) (Cardinal from 1320)
- Bertrand de Cardaillac (1321-1324)
- Jean I Tissandier (1324-1348)
- Durand de la Capelle (1348-1353)
- Jean-Roger or Jean II. (1353-1357)
- Pierre de Saint-Martial (1357-1371) (Cardinal)
- Jean III de Lanta (1371-1383)
- Jean IV (1383-1393)
- Thomas (1393-1404)
- Pierre Trousseau (1405-1416)
- Gaucelme du Bousquet (1416-1426)
- Hugues de Roffignac (1426-1460)
- Pierre Bonald (1460-1462)
- Geoffroy de Bazillac (1462-1480)
- Pierre d'Abzac de la Douze (1480-1487)
- Hugues d'Espagne (1487-1500)
- Bertrand d'Espagne (1500-1509)
- Louis de Valtan (1509-1517)
- Gaspart de Montpezat (1518-1521)
- Jean de Pins (1522-1537)
- Vacant (1537-1568)
- François du Bourg (1568-1575)
- Jean-Baptiste du Bourg (1575-1602)
- Jean de Bertier (1602-1620)
- Jean-Louis de Bertier (1620-1662)
- Antoine-François de Bertier (1662-1705)
- Pierre de Charrité de Ruthie (1706-1718)
- Alexandre de Johanne de Saumery (1720-1747)
- Jean-Marie de Catellan (1748-1771)
- Pierre-Joseph de Lastic Lescure (1771-1801)

== See also ==
- Catholic Church in France
- List of Catholic dioceses in France

== Books ==
=== Reference works ===
- Gams, Pius Bonifatius (1873). Series episcoporum Ecclesiae catholicae: quotquot innotuerunt a beato Petro apostolo. Ratisbon: Typis et Sumptibus Georgii Josephi Manz. pp. 548–549. (Use with caution; obsolete)
- Eubel, Conradus, ed. (1913). Hierarchia catholica, Tomus 1 (second ed.). Münster: Libreria Regensbergiana. p. 301. (in Latin)
- Eubel, Conradus, ed. (1914). Hierarchia catholica, Tomus 2 (second ed.). Münster: Libreria Regensbergiana. p. 175.
- Eubel, Conradus, ed. (1923). Hierarchia catholica, Tomus 3 (second ed.). Münster: Libreria Regensbergiana.
- Gauchat, Patritius (Patrice) (1935). Hierarchia catholica IV (1592-1667). Münster: Libraria Regensbergiana. p. 219.
- Ritzler, Remigius; Sefrin, Pirminus (1952). Hierarchia catholica medii et recentis aevi V (1667-1730). Patavii: Messagero di S. Antonio.
- Jean, Armand (1891). Les évêques et les archevêques de France depuis 1682 jusqu'à 1801 (in French). Paris: A. Picard. p. 520.
- Pisani, Paul (1907). Répertoire biographique de l'épiscopat constitutionnel (1791-1802) (in French). Paris: A. Picard et fils.
