= Château de La Celle-les-Bordes =

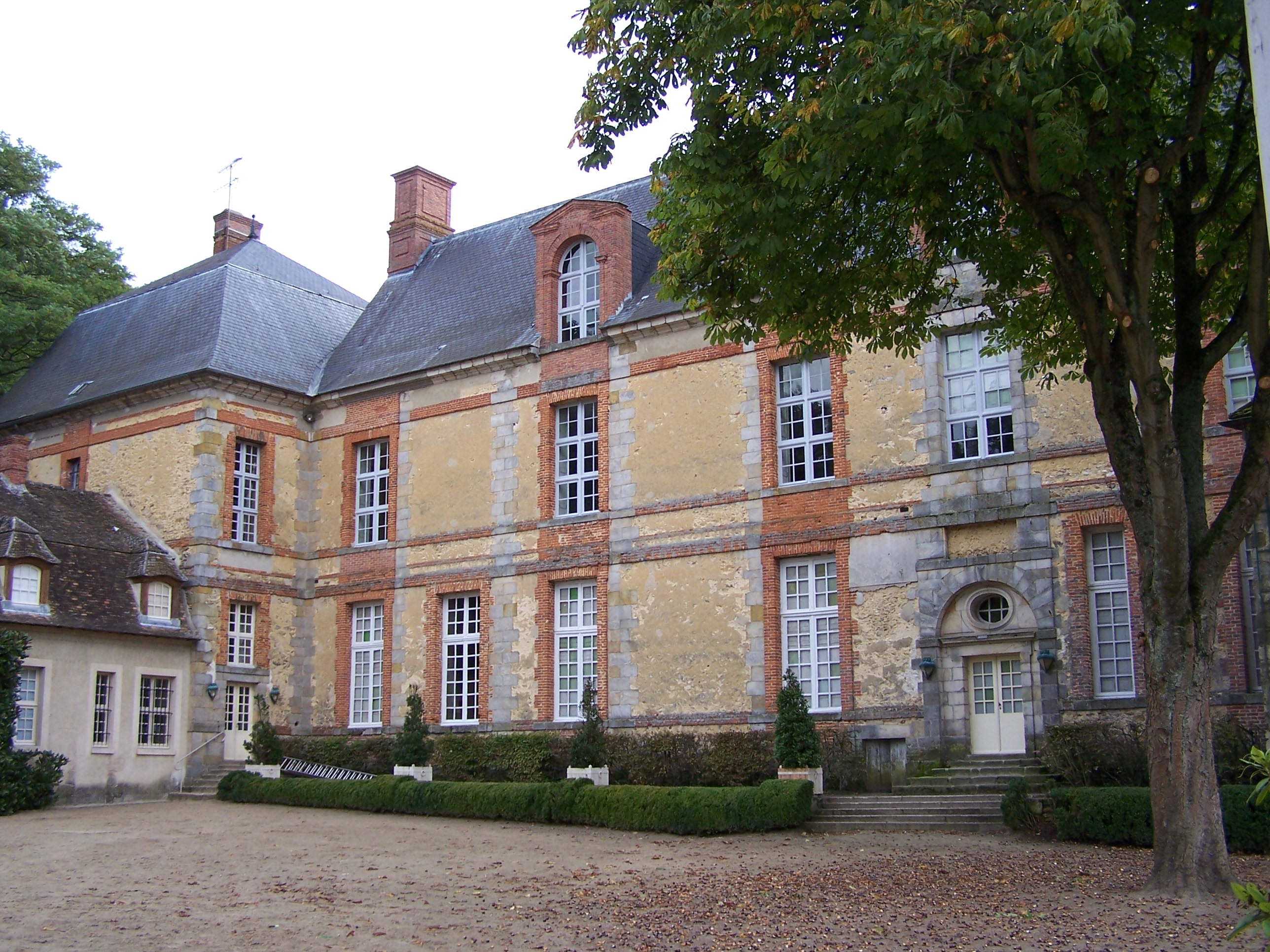
- Château de La Celle-les-Bordes, October 2006
- Interactive map of the Château de La Celle-les-Bordes area

General information
- Type: Château
- Architectural style: Louis XIII
- Location: La Celle-les-Bordes, Hurepoix, France
- Coordinates: 48°38′17″N 1°57′13″E
- Construction started: 1610
- Completed: 1614
- Client: Claude de Harville
- Owner: Thierry Gobet

Design and construction
- Designations: Monument historique

The Château de La Celle-les-Bordes (French pronunciation: [ʃɑto d(ə) la sɛl le bɔʁd]) is a French Louis XIII style château located in the commune of La Celle-les-Bordes, near Rambouillet, in the Yvelines department in the Île-de-France region in northern France.

Built between 1610 and 1614 for Count Claude de Harville, it was acquired by the Duke of Uzès in 1870, also owner of the nearby Château de Bonnelles, who made it the centre of his hunting team, the "Rallye-Bonnelles", notably installing his pack of dogs in the vast kennel. The famous Duchess of Uzès then led the crew from 1878 until her death. After her, the castle belonged to her grandson, the Duke of Brissac.

The château is currently owned by Thierry Gobet who offers tours.

== History ==
Pierre de Harville bought the fief of La Celle in 1363, during the reign of King John II, when nothing remained of the monastery founded by Saint Germain. The land then remained in the Harville family for more than three centuries. Claude de Harville (c. 1555–1636), Lord of Palaiseau and Champlan, inherited the fief of La Celle and married Catherine Juvénal des Ursins (c. 1560–1643) in 1579. Protected by Henry IV, who made him State Councillor and Vice-Admiral of France, Count Harville had the current Château de La Celle built between 1610 and 1614.

His grandson, Claude Antoine de Harville (1634–1719), had the vast kennel built, probably in 1717. His son, Anne François de Harville (1688–1750) was the last male descendant of the Harville family. After him, the castle passed to his daughter, Anne Adélaïde de Harville (1723–1761), who married Eusèbe Félix Chaspoux de Verneuil (1720–1791), Grand Cupbearer of France, in 1743.

After his death, the estate passed to their daughter Anne Isabelle Michelle Chaspoux de Verneuil (b. 1752), whose first husband, Louis Victoire Lux de Montmorin-Saint-Hérem, governor of Fontainebleau, was killed during the September Massacres of the French Revolution in 1792. Despite this tragic event, she refused to emigrate and kept La Celle-les-Bordes. In 1807, she remarried the Marquis d'Aloigny, who was appointed mayor of La Celle in 1816, and in 1817, she donated the estate to Jean-Baptiste d'Aloigny, the son of her second husband from his first marriage. He kept the estate until 1842, when he exchanged it with Jean-Louis Dupuy, owner of Neufchâtel-en-Bray. A year later, Dupuy sold all of his property at auction.

=== House of Crussol ===
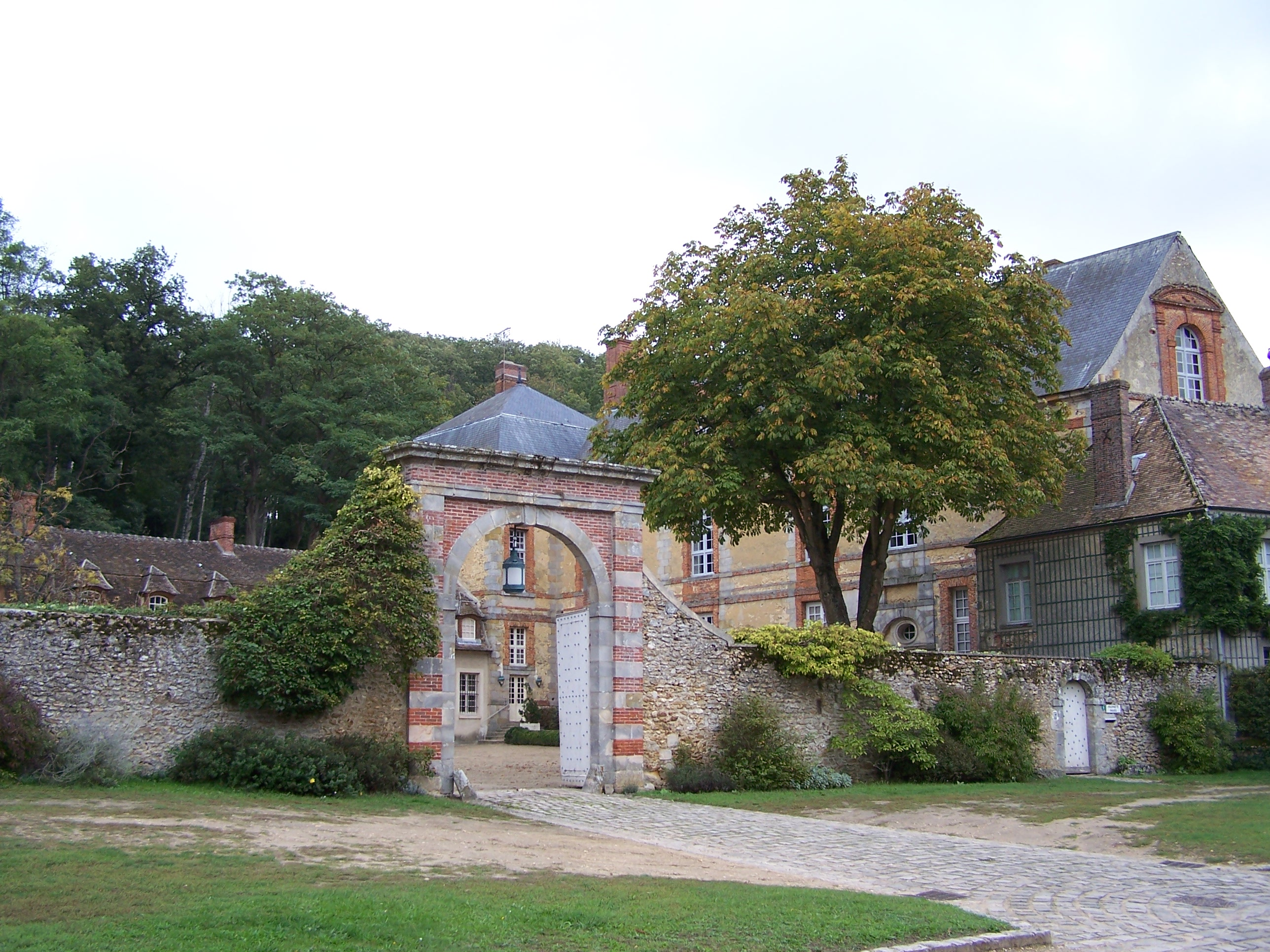
View of the entrance gate and the castle on the right

At the auction on 7 May 1843, Géraud de Crussol d'Uzès (1808–1872), 11th Duke of Uzès, bought one of the lots, consisting of woods located in the territory of Bullion, between La Celle-les-Bordes and Bonnelles, where he soon had the Château de Bonnelles built between 1847 and 1849. The other lots, including the Château de La Celle, were acquired by Vincent Cibiel (1797–1871), deputy of Aveyron from 1837 to 1848, who kept the château until 1861. He then gave it as a dowry to his daughter, Louise Claire Cibiel (1839–1891), who married Count Arthur de Marsay (1836–1888). The new owners, who lived in Loches where they built the Château d'Armaillé in 1859, sold the castle on 13 October 1864 to the Marquise Louis de Rougé, born Alexandrine Célestine de Crussol d'Uzès (a daughter of François Emmanuel de Crussol, 9th Duke of Uzès, and great-aunt of the 11th Duke). The Marquise left many co-heirs upon her death in 1866. Therefore, the castle was sold at auction on 14 May 1870 to Emmanuel de Crussol d'Uzès (1840–1878), then Duke of Crussol, who, on the death of his father in 1872, owned both La Celle and Bonnelles.

When he died in 1878, his widow, the famous Duchess of Uzès, owned the two estates that she devoted to the pleasures of hunting, running the famous "Rallye-Bonnelles" team from 1880 until her death in 1933, founded by her husband in 1872. La Celle then became an important hunting center. The kennel housed the team's pack, comprising around sixty tricolor dogs with black-white-tan coats. Over the years, the rooms of the manor were filled with over 2,000 trophy deer antlers.

When the Duchess died in 1933, finances forced the family to sell, however, the château was bought by her grandson, Pierre de Cossé-Brissac (1900–1993), 12th Duke of Brissac, who married May Schneider (a daughter of French industrialist Eugène Schneider II). In 2004, their son sold the castle to the current owner, Thierry Gobet (grandson of the creator of Innothéra).

== Gallery ==
Photographs of La Celle-lès-Bordes by Jules Beau, 1899

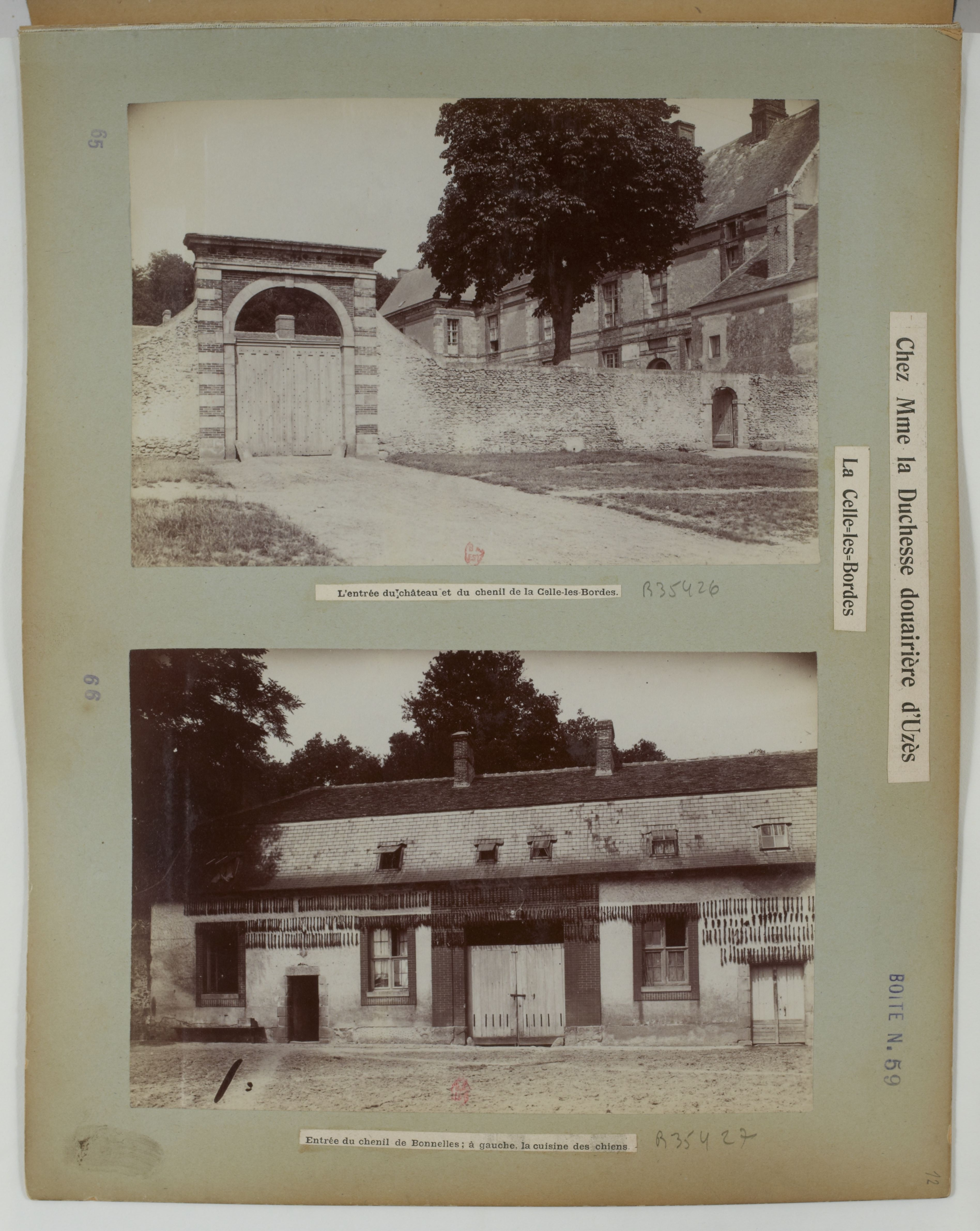
Top: The entrance to the castle and the kennel
Bottom: Entrance to the Bonnelles kennel

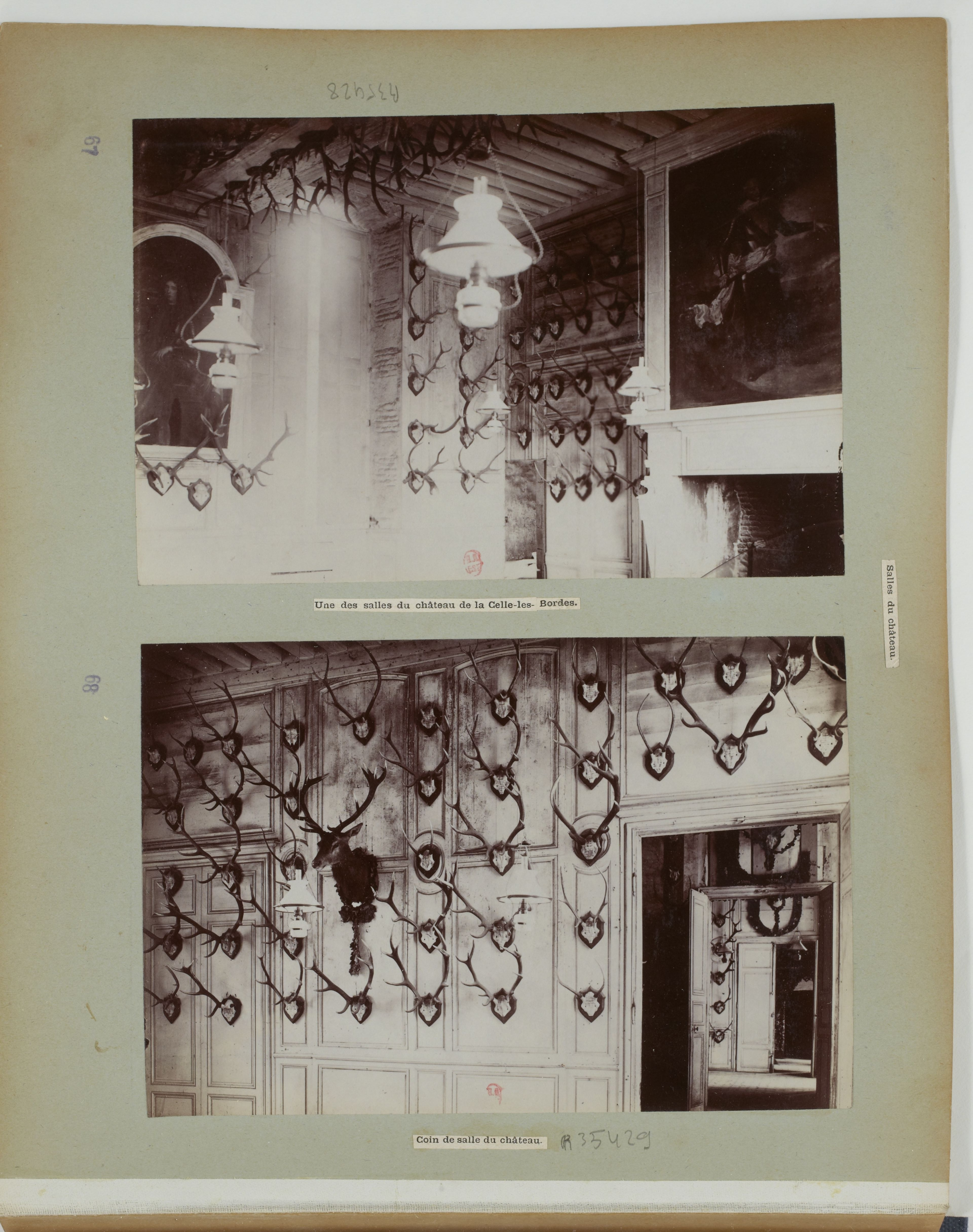
Top: One of the rooms of the castle
Bottom: Corner of the room of the castle

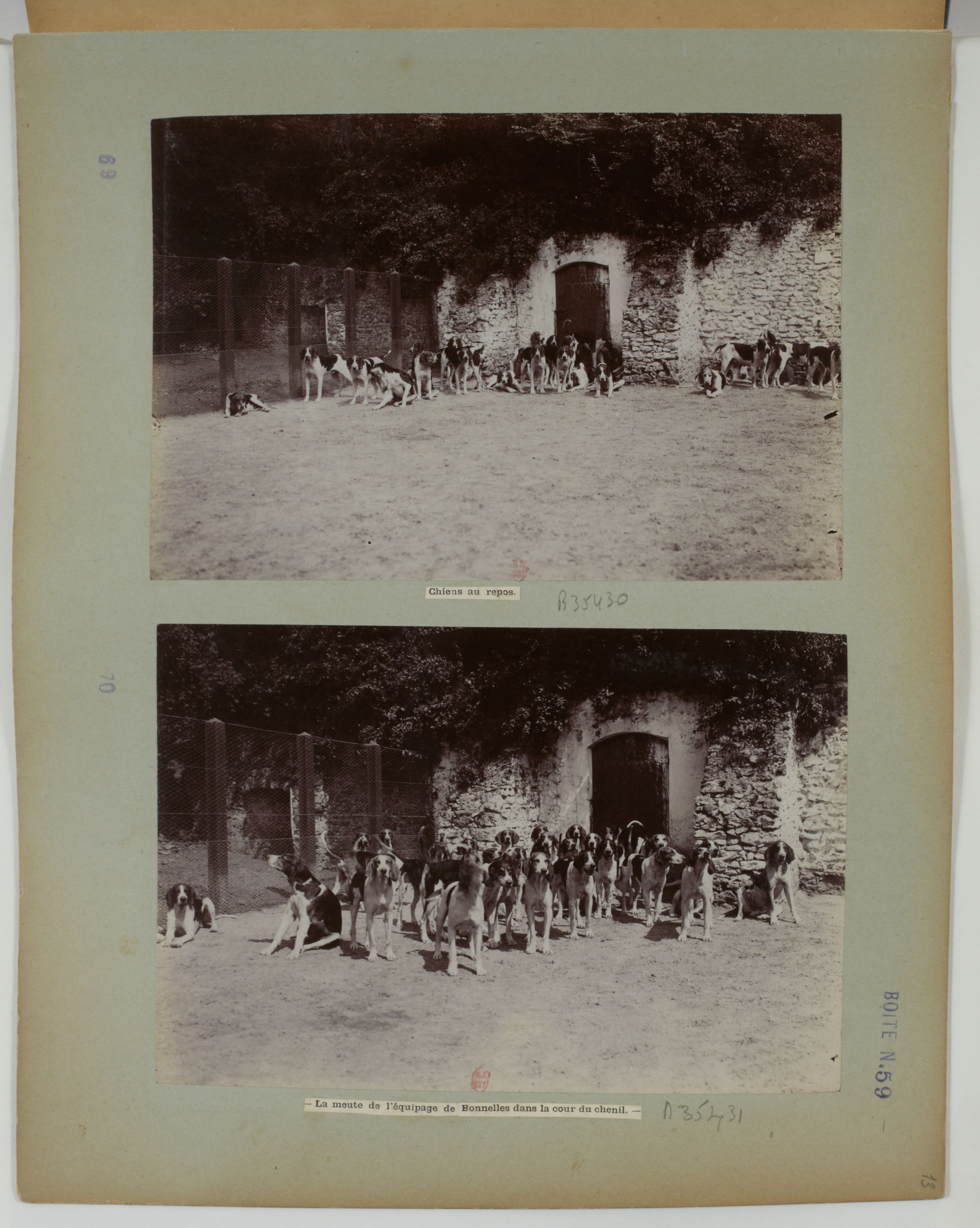
Top: Dogs resting
Bottom: The pack of the maids' crew in the kennel yard
