= Château de Bonnelles =

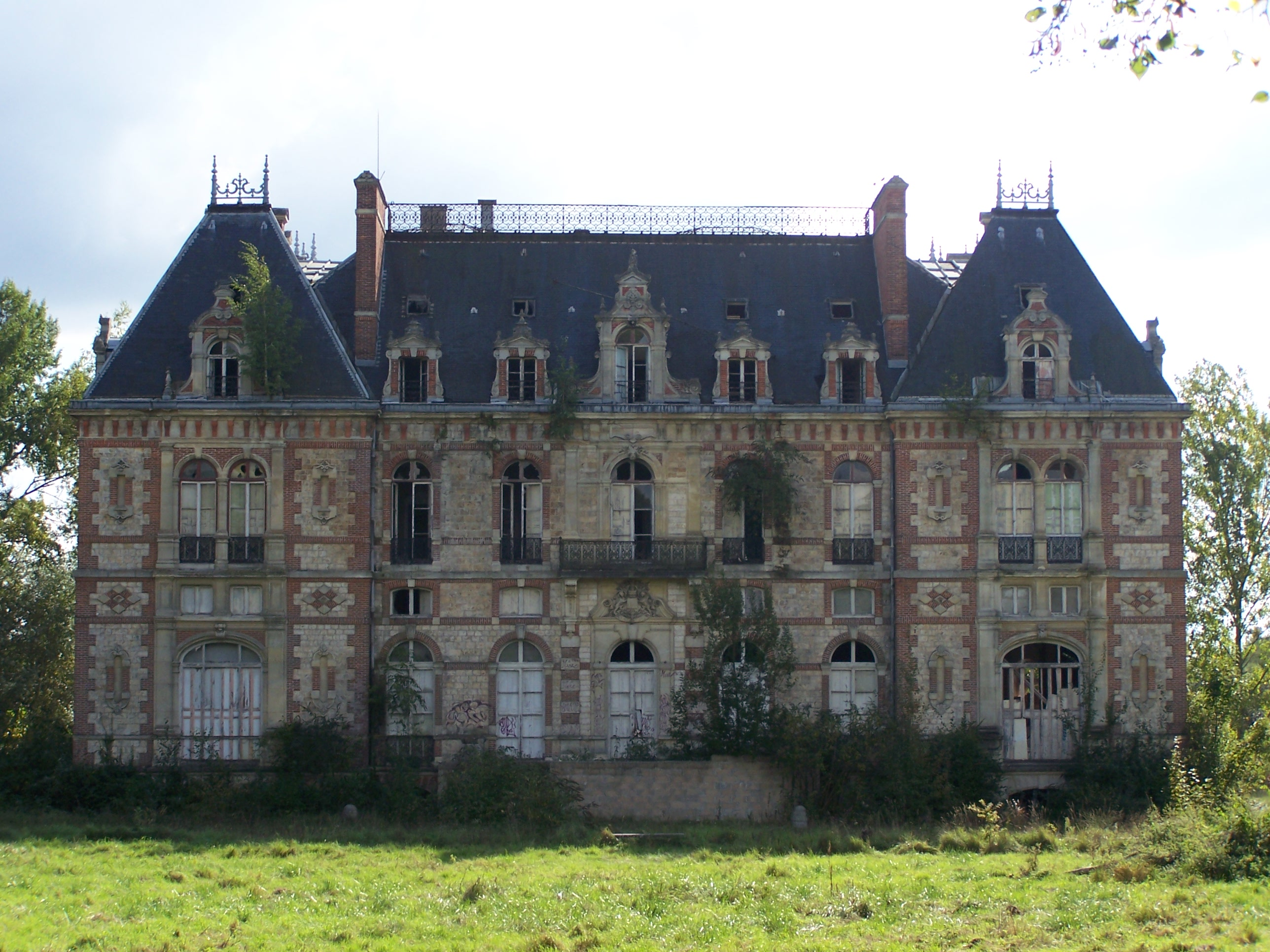
- Château de Bonnelles, September 2006
- Interactive map of the Château de Bonnelles area

General information
- Type: Château
- Architectural style: Louis XIII
- Location: Bonnelles, Hurepoix, Ile-de-France, France
- Coordinates: 48°37′13″N 2°01′22″E
- Construction started: 1847
- Completed: 1849
- Client: Géraud de Crussol

Design and construction
- Architects: Joseph-Antoine Froelicher, Clément Parent
- Designations: Monument historique

The Château de Bonnelles is a French castle located in the commune of Bonnelles, near Saint-Arnoult-en-Yvelines, in the Yvelines department of France.

The current castle, the third on the property, in the Louis XIII style, was built between 1847 and 1849 by the architects Joseph-Antoine Froelicher and Clément Parent, was an important hunting centre when it was the favourite residence of the famous Duchess of Uzès.

== History ==
The estate is located on the border of Hurepoix and Beauce. The first castle was built there towards the end of the 15th or the beginning of the 16th century, likely by the Villeneuve family. It was enlarged in the middle of the 16th century by the addition of a new wing, while a second new wing, perpendicular to the first, was built towards the end of the 16th or the beginning of the 17th century.

In the 16th century, the land of Bonnelles briefly passed to the Lamoignon family through the 1591 marriage of Henriette de Lamoignon, daughter of Chrétien de Lamoignon, with Charles de La Villeneuve. Widowed, having lost her only son, she bequeathed Bonnelles to her nephew, Claude de Bullion (1568–1640), son of her elder sister, Charlotte, who was Minister of Finance under Louis XIII.

=== Second castle ===
The first castle, which had been damaged by fire in 1724, was demolished in 1764 and a new castle was built on its site. In 1769, the castle was bequeathed by Auguste-Léon de Bullion, Marquis de Bonnelles, to his nephew, François Emmanuel de Crussol (1728–1802), 9th Duke of Uzès, who inherited it in 1771. The estate thus entered the properties of the House of Crussol. This second castle, with a rectangular plan, was doubled in 1782, while a few garden buildings were also built.

The castle was later confiscated as an émigré's property, was demolished at the end of the 18th century during the upheaval caused by the French Revolution and the succeeding Napoleonic rule. The estate was abandoned for some time.

On his return to France, Marie François Emmanuel de Crussol (1756–1843), 10th Duke of Uzès, managed to have the estate returned to him, which he considerably enlarged.

=== Third castle ===
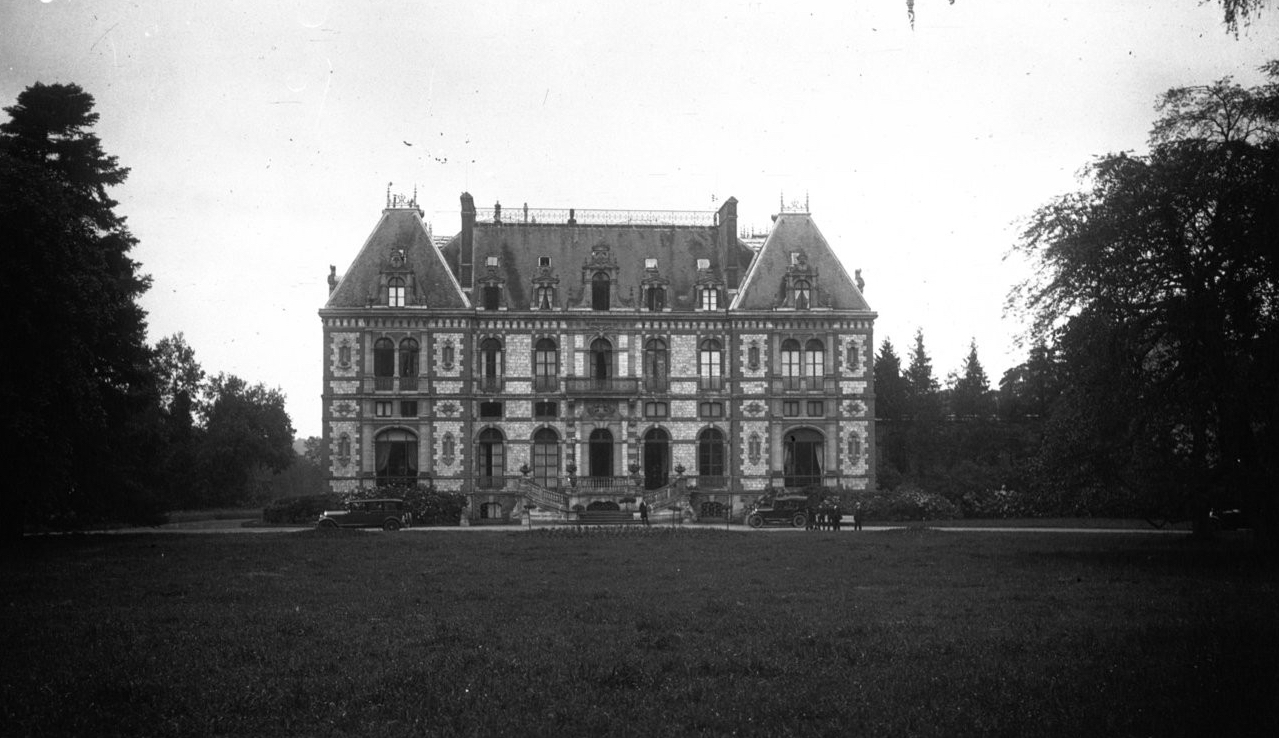
First outing of the Automobile Club féminin de France, held at the castle, 1926

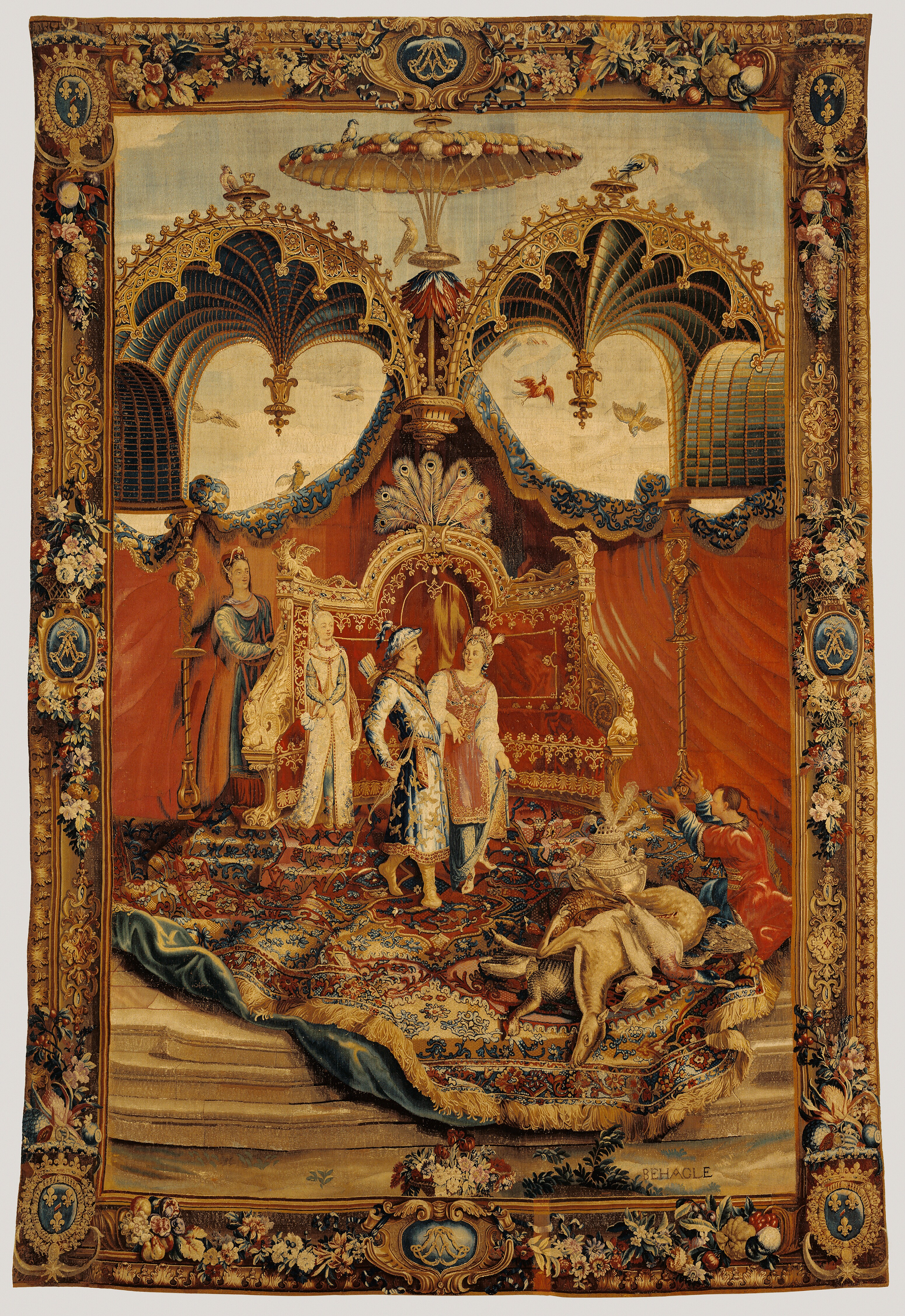
Tapestry: Le Retour de la chasse, from L'Histoire de l'empereur de la Chine Series, which hung at the castle until 1925

The third, and current, château was built between 1847 and 1849, in a style "indistinctly reminiscent of the Renaissance and Louis XIII", by the architects Joseph-Antoine Froelicher and Clément Parent for Géraud de Crussol d'Uzès (1808–1872), 11th Duke of Uzès, who used part of his wife's fortune to fund it. The former Françoise de Talhouët-Roy, she was heiress, through her mother, to a portion of the enormous landed estate of Count Antoine Roy (also a Minister of Finance).

The great era of Bonnelles began with the wealthy Anne de Rochechouart de Mortemart (1847–1933), heiress of the Veuve Clicquot champagne fortune, who became Duchess of Crussol, then Duchess of Uzès, through her marriage to Emmanuel de Crussol (1840–1878), 12th Duke of Uzès. Passionate about hunting, the Duchess made Bonnelles her residence.

Towards the end of the 19th century, the 2,000 hectare hunting estate was one of the most renowned hunting centres, home to the famous "Rallye Bonnelles" in the Rambouillet forest, founded by the 12th Duke of Uzès in 1871, and subsequently managed by his widow.

The Duchess of Uzès received there, in particular, on the 5th and November 6, 1884 Grand Duke Vladimir Alexandrovich of Russia and Grand Duchess Marie, Queen Amelie of Portugal in 1907, King Constantine I of Greece in 1914, Shah Ahmed of Persia in April 1920, the sister of the Emperor of Japan in 1925. During World War I, the Duchess transformed her castle into a military hospital, working there herself as a nurse.

After the death of the Duchess in 1933, finances forced the family to sell furniture was dispersed in July at the château itself, in the presence of a large crowd; the library was dispersed in the autumn; the estate itself was sold and passed through several hands, including to the société du Sud-Lumière in 1939.

=== Post World War II ===
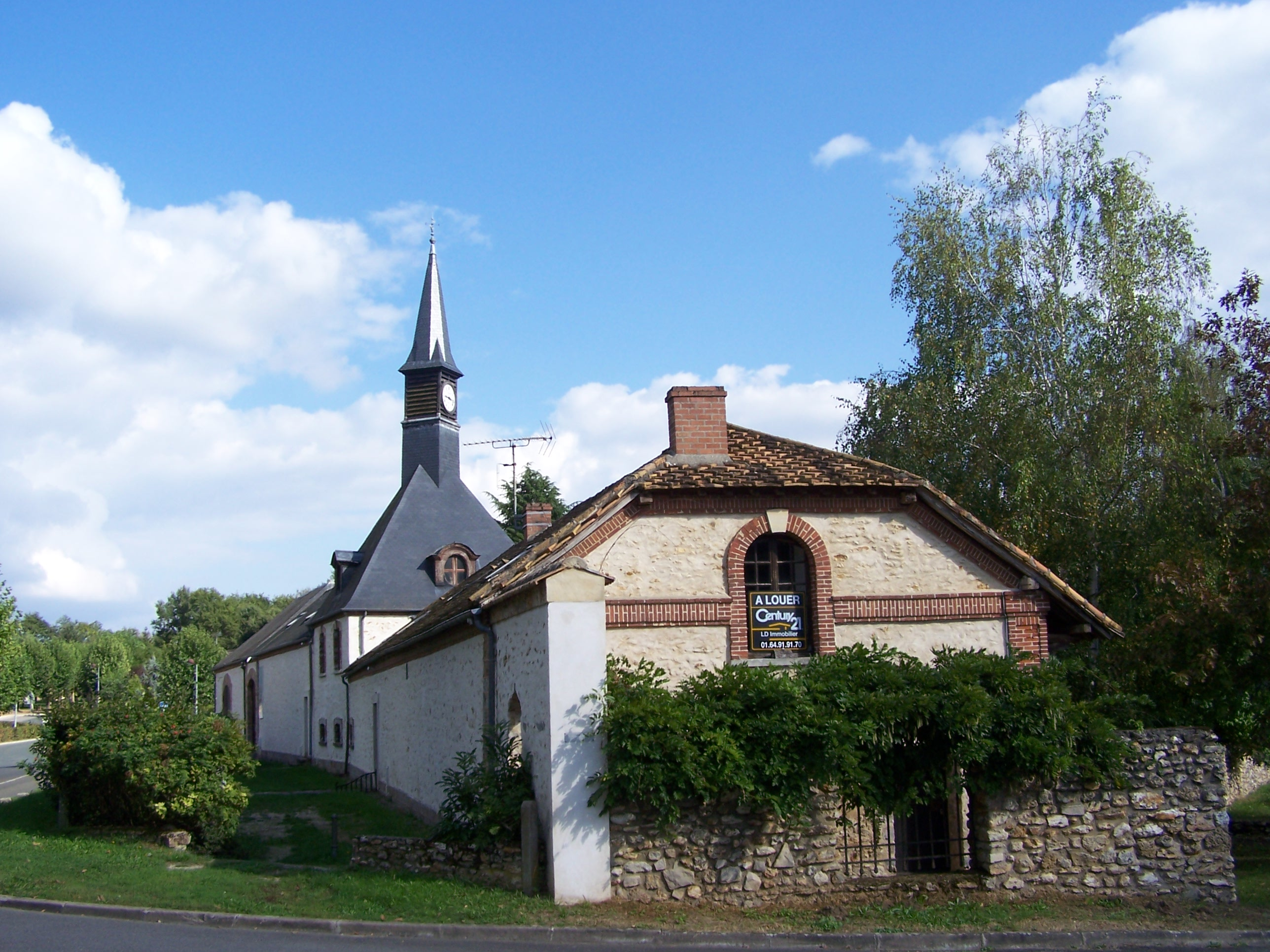
Bonnelles' Louveterie, 2006

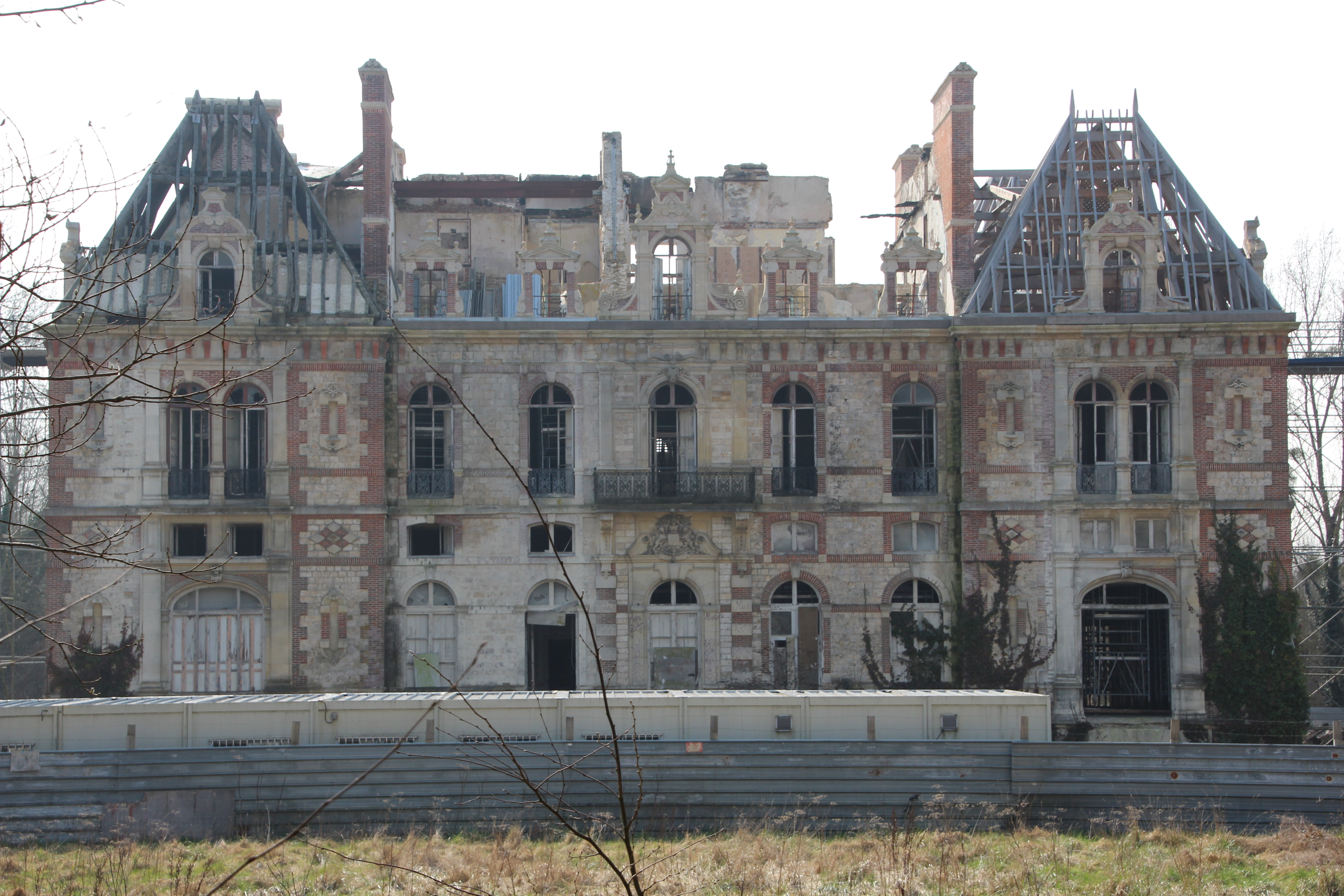
The castle in 2015, after the 2008 fire

After World War II, the castle was sold in 1945, becoming the home of the White Fathers Seminary (French: Séminaire des Pères blancs). In 1965, Jean Sayad created the Charles de Foucault Boarding School (French: Collège-internat Charles de Foucault). In the mid-1970s, it became the Bonnelles International College (French: Collège international de Bonnelles) by Kaminsky who bought the castle from the White Fathers. In 1972, the castle and the adjoining college served as a filming location for the first two parts of Le Jeune Fabre by Cécile Aubry, broadcast in 1973.

In the early 1990s, the castle was acquired by a Japanese company that planned to transform it into a golf course. However, it was abandoned and deteriorated significantly. It was bought by Luxembourg investors in the 2000s, who planned to transform it into a luxury hotel. A restoration and redevelopment project was drawn up by architects Christian Dugelay and Jean-Édouard Girardot.

On 23 September 2008, a fire destroyed a large part of the roof. The castle underwent major restoration beginning Spring 2009. By decree of 8 April 2010, the castle is protected as a monument historique for its façade, roofs and dining room. At the beginning of 2015, the scaffolding was removed, revealing the extent of the damage suffered by the building. In 2017, under the aegis of the company "Histoire et patrimoine", work began to build 44 apartments from studios to three-room apartments. The façades and roofs were restored to maintain the style of the castle, listed as a historic monument. Work was completed in 2021.

The castle park, which became the property of the French National Forests Office in 2018, is undergoing development work to open it to the public.

== Gallery ==
Photographs of Bonnelles by Jules Beau, 1899

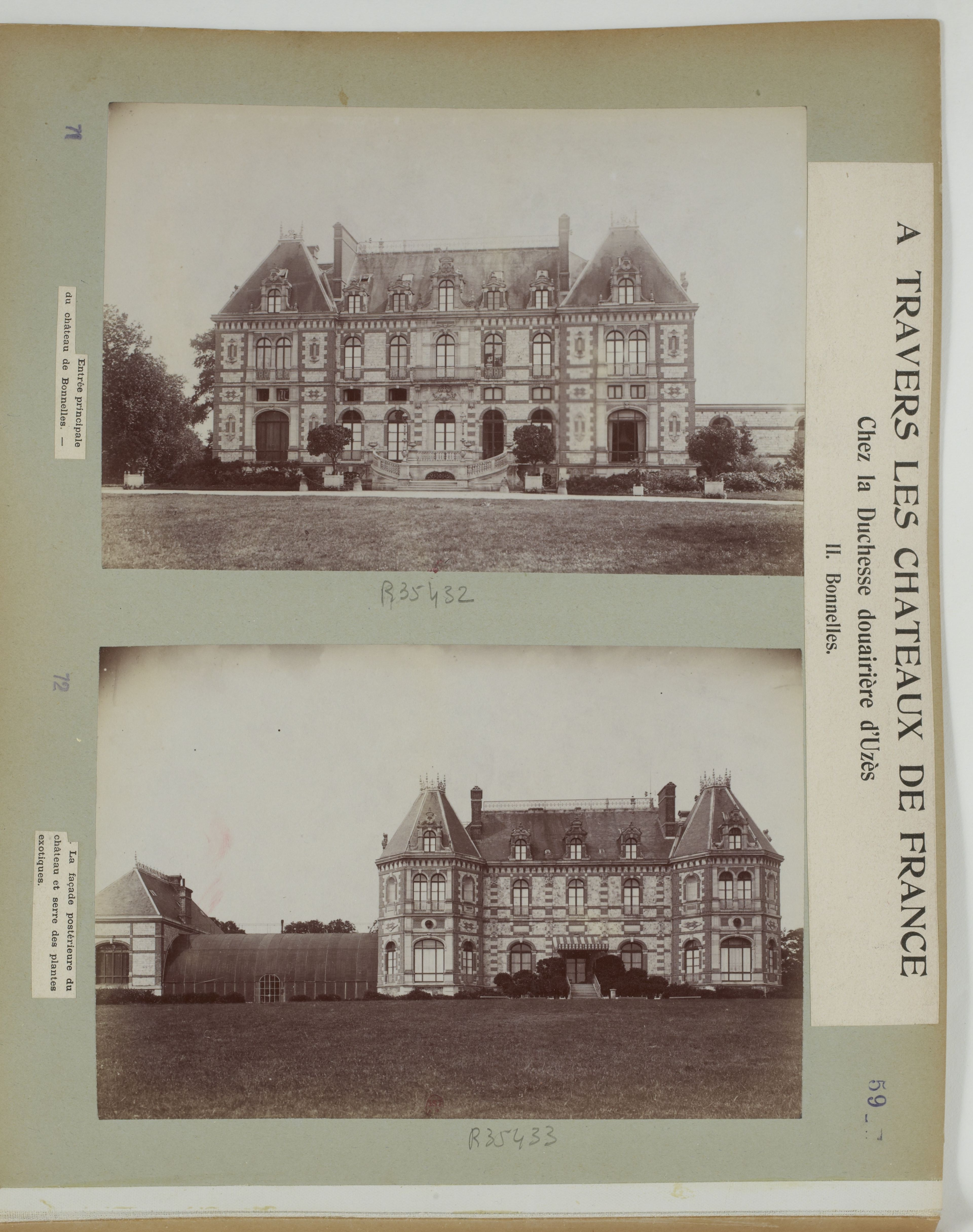
Top: Main entrance to the château
Bottom: The rear façade of the château and greenhouse of exotic plants

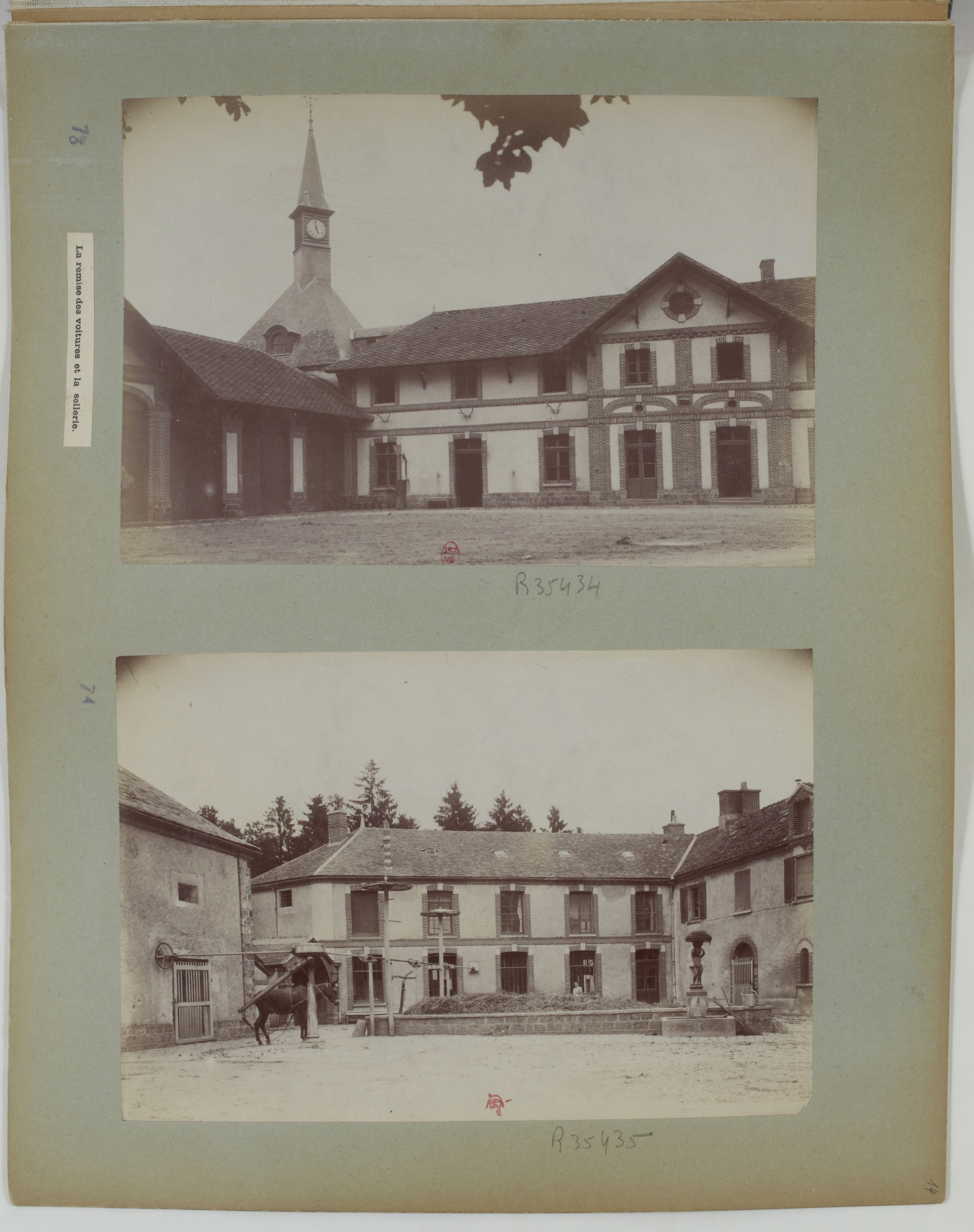
The garage and the saddlery

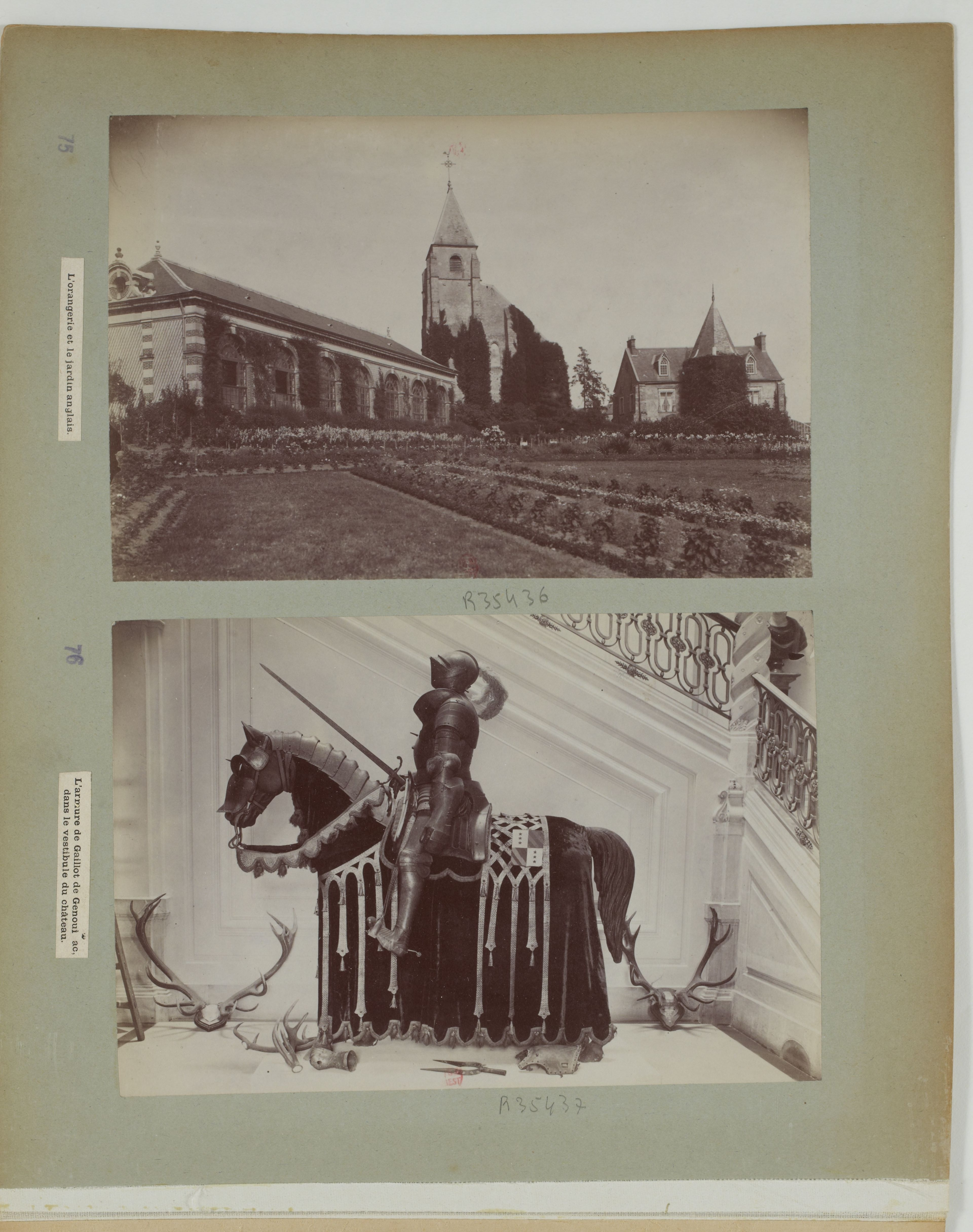
Top: The Orangery and the English Garden
Bottom: Armor of Galiot de Genouillac, in the vestibule of the castle

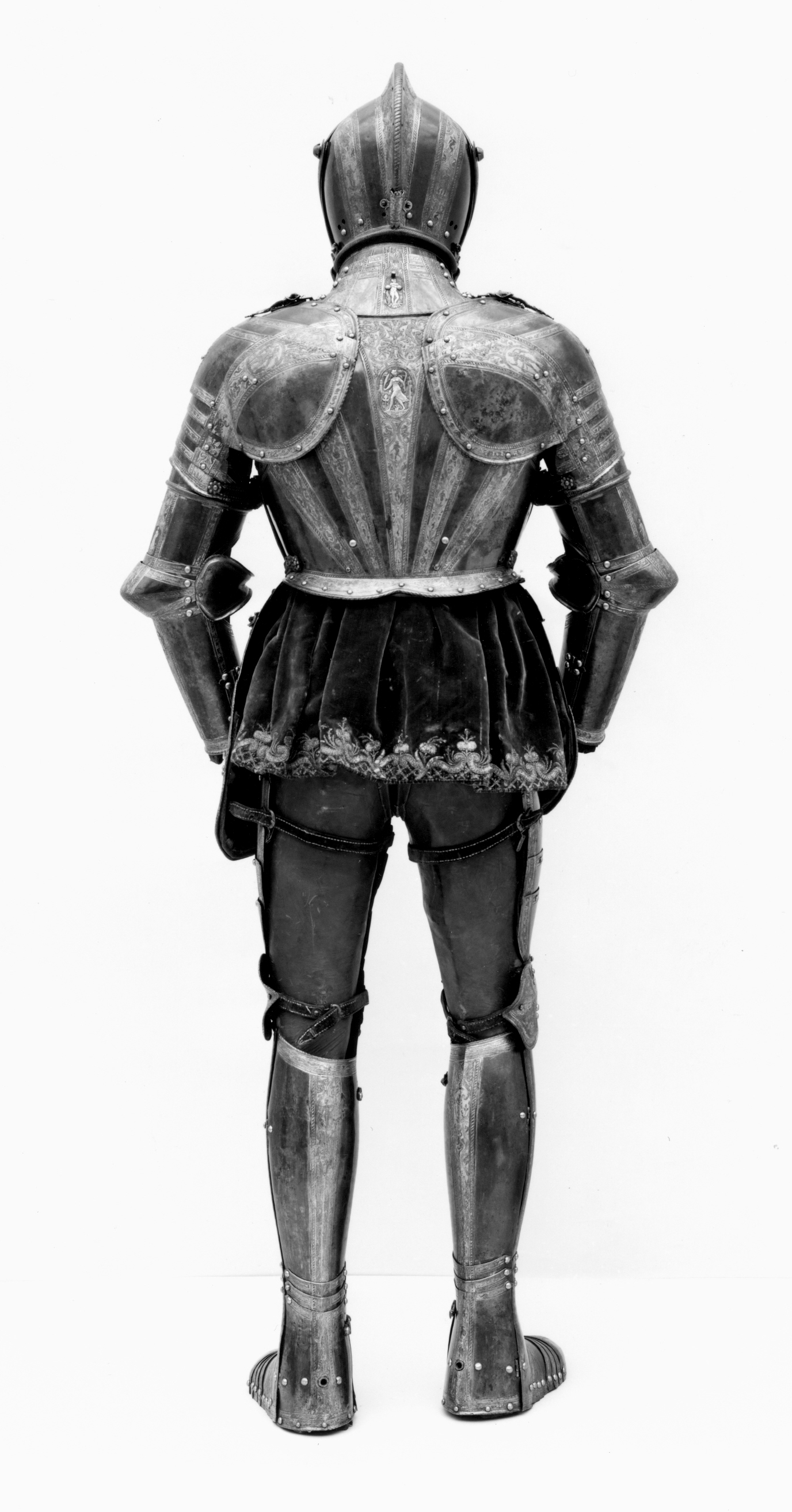
Armor for Field and Tournament, c. 1575–80, formerly at the castle (back)

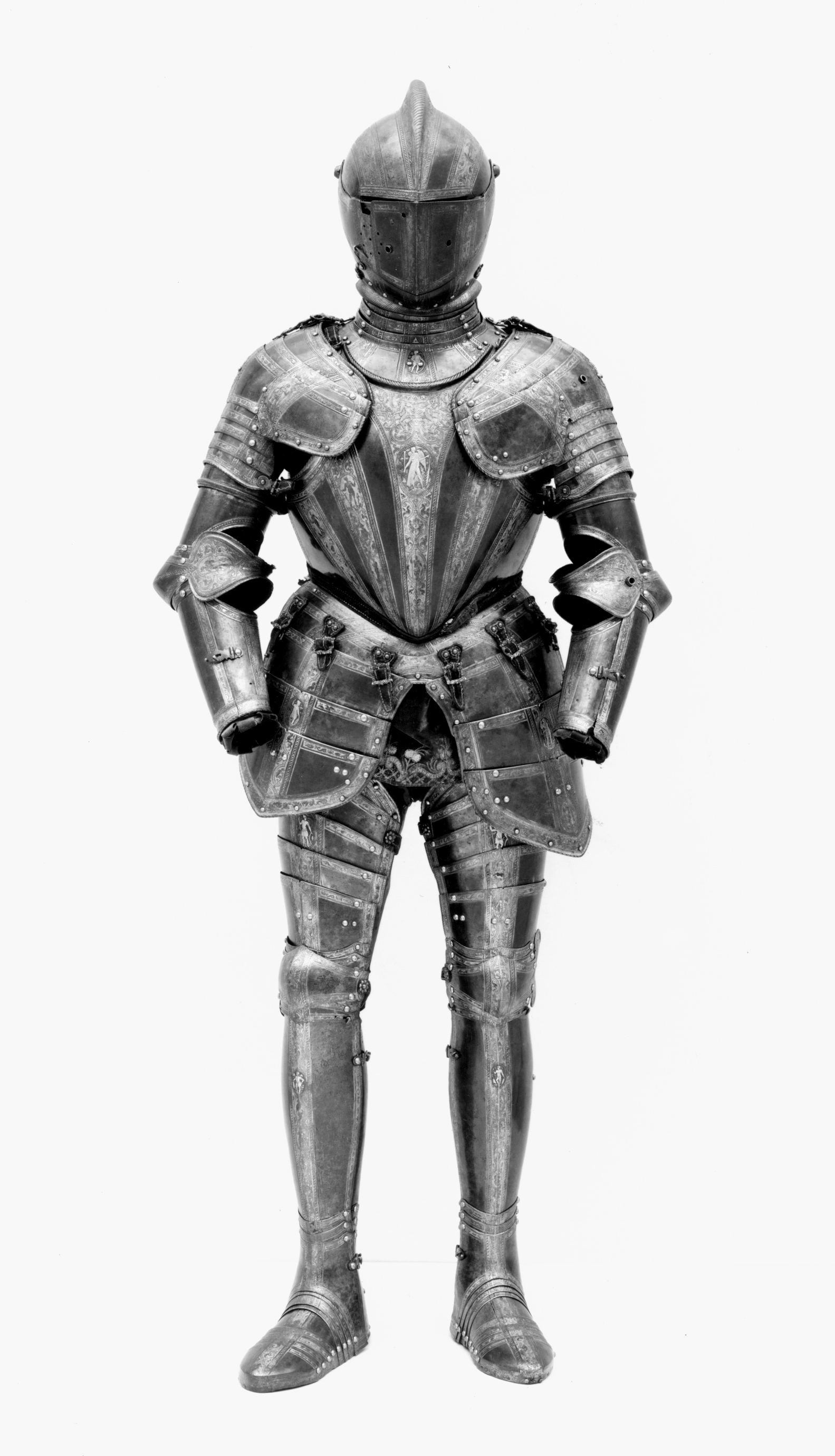
Armor for Field and Tournament, c. 1575–80, formerly at the castle (front)
