= Hôtel de Castries =

Coordinates: 48°51′18.80″N 2°19′09.34″E

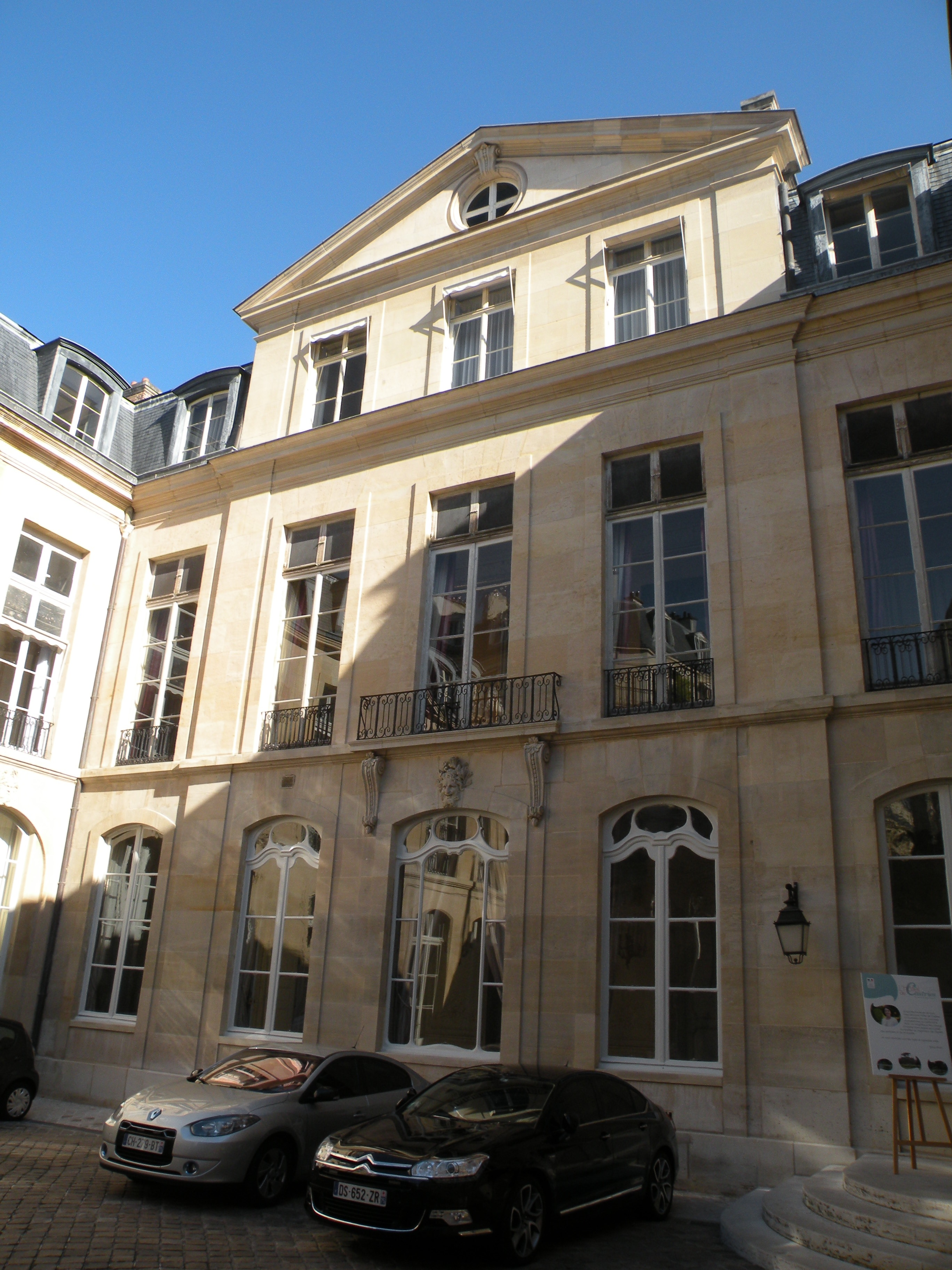
- The Hôtel de Castries
- Interactive map of the Hôtel de Castries area

General information
- Location: 7th arrondissement of Paris, France

The Hôtel de Castries (French pronunciation: [otɛl də kastʁi]) is an hôtel particulier in the 7th arrondissement of Paris, at 72 Rue de Varenne. Dating from the end of the 17th and beginning of the 18th century, it was profoundly transformed by the Duke of Castries between 1843 and 1863, under the architects Joseph-Antoine Froelicher and François Clément Joseph Parent.

It is a property of the state. As of August 2022, it is the office of the Government Spokesman.

== History ==
=== Hôtel de Nogent ===
The hôtel was originally built around the end of the 17th century by Jean Dufour, seigneur de Nogent. Typical of residences of this time, it had a courtyard forming a perfect square and two wings projecting off a central body to form a U, all of the same height. Slate-roofed, each of the wings had a passage running through it, with that on the left (preserved today) leading to the kitchens and that on the right to the stables.

In the right wing was to be found an antechamber, a grand staircase, a dining room, another room of the stables, and an attic. The left wing also contained a staircase with iron stair rods, three small rooms, another room, and another attic. The central body contained a double-height (i.e. filling the ground and first floors) great hall and four other rooms.

=== Alterations by the marquis de Castries ===
On 27 September 1708, Jean Dufour's widow, Angélique Guyner, sold the hôtel to Jean François de La Croix de Castries (1663-1728), first marquis de Castries, who bought it with an inheritance from his uncle the cardinal of Bonzi (?-1703), archbishop of Narbonne. That inheritance also meant he could afford to spend 20,000 livres on rebuilding of the house and expansion of its gardens from 1708 to 1714. The Castries family held onto it until the end of the 19th century. On his death, the building was rented in 1729 to Charles Armand de Gontaut-Biron (1663-1756), for 7,500 livres a year.

=== Embellishments by the marshal de Castries ===
In 1743, the marquis's third son, Charles Eugène Gabriel de La Croix de Castries (1727-1801), future marshal of France, recuperated at the family hôtel and installed himself there before his marriage to Gabrielle Isabeau Thérèse de Rozet de Rocozel de Fleury, daughter of the first duc de Fleury. A 1761 inheritance from his uncle the Marshal of Belle-Isle left Charles to with a huge fortune, and allowed him to initiate grand works on the hôtel's interior decoration, led by the sculptor Jacques Verberckt. A new gate onto the street was built by Jacques-Antoine Payen in 1762, which may still be seen, and the two wings were linked by a high wall surmounted by a balustrade. In 1778, Adrien-Louis de Bonnieres, duc de Guines (1735-1806), rented part of this mansion, and he died here at the age of seventy-one.

=== Additions by the second duke of Castries ===
During the French Revolution, the hôtel was seized as one of the goods of an émigré and assigned to the ministry of war.

In 1842, on the death of his father, the second duke of Castries, Edmond Eugène Philippe Hercule de La Croix de Castries (1787-1866) undertook important restoration and transformation work on the building, by then in a poor state, under the direction of Joseph-Antoine Froelicher between 1843 and 1863, then under the direction of his son-in-law, François Clément Joseph Parent, who directed the works until his death. It was these works that gave the building its present appearance.

As early as 1851, the duke of Castries took tenants: the Clermont-Tonnerres et les La Rochefoucauld-Liancourts occupied the left wing; at the beginning of the Second French Empire, the Lestrades, the Saint-Aignans, the Laguiches and the comte de Beaumont all had apartments in the hôtel de Castries.

=== After the Castries ===
On the death of the second duke of Castries, the hôtel passed to his nephew Edmond Charles Auguste de La Croix de Castries. On his death in 1886, his widow remarried, to vicomte Emmanuel d’Harcourt, who sold the hôtel de Castries to the Montgermonts. The hôtel was therefore lived in by prince Louis de Broglie, the comtesse de la Roche-Aymon, and the comte de Castellane, who rented the ground floor and garden in 1936.

In 1946, the Domaines requisitioned the hôtel to house the Ministry of Agriculture. Several other ministries later occupied the building, including the Fonction Publique and its present occupiers the Ministry of Housing and Cities.
