= Emmanuel de Crussol, 12th Duke of Uzès =

French soldier and politician

Emmanuel de Crussol 12th Duke of Uzès
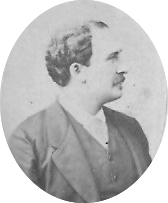

General Councilor of Gard Canton of Uzès
- In office 1871–1878
- Preceded by: Maxime Goirand de Labaume
- Succeeded by: Gaston Coste

Member of Parliament for Gard
- In office 8 February 1871 – 7 March 1876

Personal details
- Born: Amable Antoine Jacques Emmanuel de Crussol; 18 January 1840 Paris, France
- Died: 28 November 1878 (aged 38) Paris, France
- Spouse: Anne de Rochechouart de Mortemart (m. 1867; died 1878)
- Children: Jacques de Crussol d'Uzès; Simone de Crussol d'Uzès; Louis de Crussol d'Uzès; Mathilde Renée de Crussol d'Uzès
- Parent(s): Géraud de Crussol d'Uzès; Françoise de Talhouët-Roy
- Relatives: Crussol family
- Education: École spéciale militaire de Saint-Cyr

Amable Antoine Jacques Emmanuel de Crussol, 12th Duke of Uzès (18 January 1840 – 28 November 1878), known as the Duke of Crussol from 1843 to 1872, was a French soldier and politician.

== Early life ==
He was born in Paris on 18 January 1840 as the son of Géraud de Crussol, 11th Duke of Uzès (1808–1872), and Françoise de Talhouët-Roy (1818–1863). His elder sister, Laure, married Joseph Philippe Léopold Vogt, Viscount of Hunolstein. His younger siblings were Frédéric Jacques, who died accidentally while attending the École navale; Élisabeth Olive Emmanuelle, who married the Marquis Louis Marie Hector de Galard de Béarn; and Mathilde, who died unmarried.

His paternal grandparents were Adrien-François-Emmanuel de Crussol, styled Duke of Crussol (as eldest son and heir apparent of Marie-François-Emmanuel de Crussol, 10th Duke of Uzès), and Catherine Victoire Victurnienne de Rochechouart-Mortemart (a daughter of Victurnien de Rochechouart, 10th Duke of Mortemart). His maternal grandparents were Auguste-Frédéric de Talhouët, Marquis de Talhouët, and Alexandrine Roy (daughter and heiress of Count Antoine Roy).

== Career ==
Crussol entered the École spéciale militaire de Saint-Cyr in 1857, graduating in 1859. He was appointed second lieutenant in the 3rd Hussar Regiment, but did not receive his lieutenant's stripes until 1864. Shortly after his marriage in 1867, however, Crussol left the French Army.

He was an unsuccessful candidate in the elections to the Legislature on 24 May 1869 as an independent candidate for Gard's 2nd constituency (Uzès), which his father had already represented in the lower house of the Second Empire from 1852 to 1857. But he was elected representative to the National Assembly in this same constituency on 8 February 1871, and took his place on the extreme right, registering with the Réunion Colbert and the Cercle des Réservoirs. He was part of the budget commission and voted for peace, for the repeal of the laws of exile, for the bishops' petition, for the resignation of Thiers, for the seven-year term, for the Broglie ministry, against the Wallon amendment and the constitutional laws of 1875. He did not stand again in the 1876 elections.

== Personal life ==
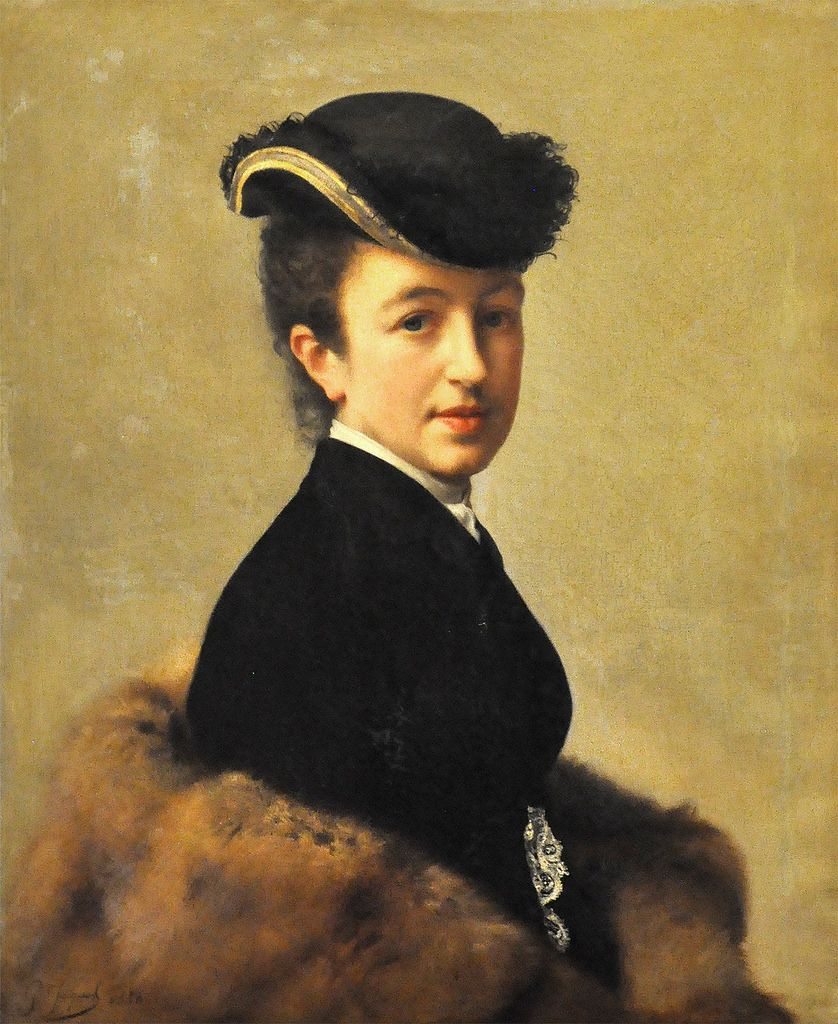
Portrait of his wife, Anne de Rochechouart de Mortemart

On 5 December 1866, he lost an eye during a hunting accident, when he was accidentally shot by his brother-in-law, Viscount of Hunolstein.

On 10 May 1867, he married Anne de Rochechouart de Mortemart (1847–1933) in Paris. The daughter of Louis de Rochechouart, Count of Mortemart, and Marie Clémentine de Chevigné, she was the heiress of her great-grandmother, Madame Clicquot Ponsardin, founder of the Veuve Clicquot Champagne house, including the Château de Boursault, which she inherited on Madame Clicquot's death in 1866.

Together, they had four children:

- Jacques Marie Géraud de Crussol (1868–1893), who died during an expedition he was leading in Africa; he died unmarried without issue.
- Simone Louise Laure de Crussol (1870–1946), who married Honoré d'Albert de Luynes, 10th Duke of Luynes and Chevreuse, son of Charles d'Albert, 9th Duke of Luynes and Yolande de La Rochefoucauld, in 1889.
- Louis Emmanuel de Crussol (1871–1943), who married Thérèse d'Albert de Luynes, a first cousin of Simone's husband, who was the only daughter of Princess Sophie Galitzine, and Paul d'Albert de Luynes, Duke of Chaulnes and Picquigny, in 1894. They divorced in 1938 and he married an American, Josephine Angela in 1939.
- Mathilde Renée de Crussol (1875–1908), who married François de Cossé, 11th Duke of Brissac, a grandson of Louis Say (founder of the Say sugar empire) in 1894.

The Duke died in Paris on 28 November 1878 and was succeeded by his eldest son, Jacques. His widow died in 1933.

=== Residences ===
The Duke inherited, and acquired, a number of properties in France, including the Hôtel de Vaudreuil in the 7th arrondissement of Paris at 7 Rue de la Chaise. In 1870, he acquired, at auction, the Château de La Celle in La Celle-les-Bordes. Upon his father's death in 1872, he inherited the Château de Bonnelles in Bonnelles, where he had founded the famous "Rallye-Bonnelles", a hunting team in the Rambouillet forest, in 1871. In 1873, he had the Château de Villette built in Ménestreau-en-Villette.

French nobility
Preceded by Géraud de Crussol d'Uzès	Duke of Uzès; 1872–1878	Succeeded by Jacques Marie Géraud de Crussol
