= Géraud de Crussol, 11th Duke of Uzès =

French soldier and politician

Géraud Armand de Crussol 11th Duke of Uzès
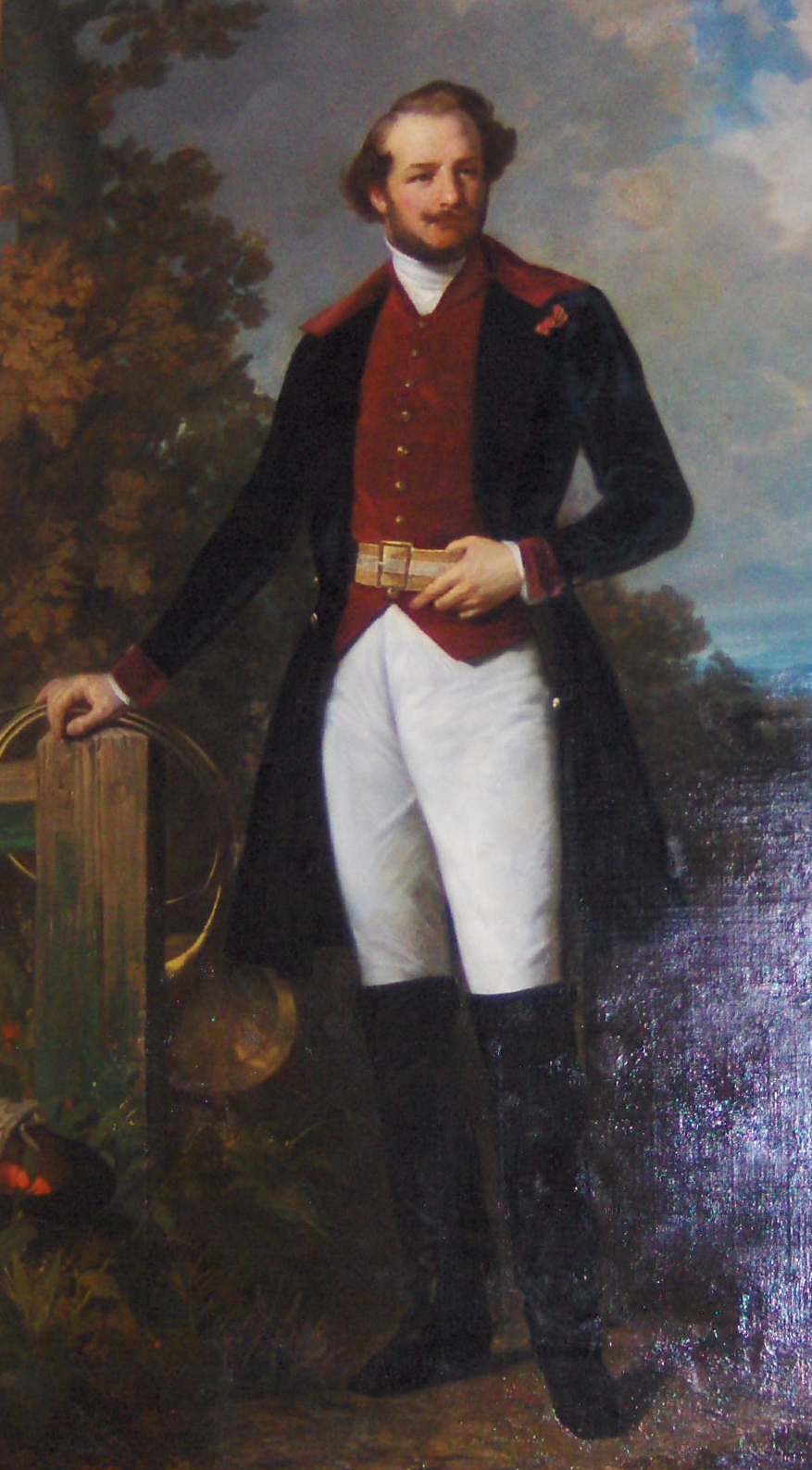

Member of Parliament for Gard
- In office 29 February 1852 – 29 May 1857

General Councilor of Gard Canton of Uzès
- In office 1848–1852
- Preceded by: Edouard Serre
- Succeeded by: Maxime Goirand de Labaume

Personal details
- Born: Géraud Armand Victurnien Jacques Emmanuel de Crussol; 27 January 1808 Paris, France
- Died: 22 March 1872 (aged 64) Paris, France
- Spouse: Françoise de Talhouët-Roy (m. 1836; died 1863)
- Relations: See Crussol
- Children: Laure de Crussol; Emmanuel de Crussol; Frédéric Jacques de Crussol; Élisabeth Olive Emmanuelle de Crussol; Mathilde de Crussol
- Parent(s): Adrien-François-Emmanuel de Crussol; Catherine Victoire Victurnienne de Rochechouart-Mortemart

Géraud Armand Victurnien Jacques Emmanuel de Crussol, 11th Duke of Uzès (27 January 1808 – 22 March 1872), known as the Duke of Crussol from 1837 to 1842, was a French soldier and politician who was a member of the Chamber of Deputies from 1843 to 1848 and of the legislature from 1852 to 1857.

== Early life ==
Crussol was born in Paris on 27 January 1808. He was the son of Adrien-François-Emmanuel de Crussol, styled Duke of Crussol (1778–1837), and Catherine Victoire Victurnienne de Rochechouart-Mortemart (1776–1809). His sister, Victurnienne Anastasie Victorine de Crussol d'Uzès, married Olivier du Bouchet de Sourches, 2nd Duke of Tourzel (grandson of Louise Élisabeth de Croÿ) in 1832.

His father was the eldest son, and heir apparent until his early death, of Marie-François-Emmanuel de Crussol, 10th Duke of Uzès and Emilie de Châtillon, Duchess of Châtillon. His maternal grandparents were Victurnien de Rochechouart, 10th Duke of Mortemart, and, his first wife, Anne-d'Harcourt (only daughter of François-Henri d'Harcourt, Duke of Harcourt).

== Career ==
Crussol joined the Cavalry and, after a year spent in the service of Russia, took part in the Balkans campaign. He was made a Knight of the Legion of Honour on 14 December 1828. As his father died in 1837, predeceasing his grandfather, upon the latter's death in 1842, Géraud became the 11th Duke of Uzès.

On 13 August 1843, he was elected Deputy by Haute-Marne's 2nd constituency (Bourbonne), and re-elected on 1 August 1846. He took his place among the deputies devoted to the July Monarchy. Following his vote in favour of the Pritchard indemnity, he fought a duel with the Marquis de Calvière, a fervent legitimist, son of a prefect and former deputy. He left public life at the time of the February Revolution of 1848.

Although he did not support the policies of Napoleon III, he was elected during the Second Empire to the Legislative Body on 29 February 1852 as an independent candidate in Gard's 2nd constituency (Uzès). He was a member of the budget committee and spoke only once during the first session (1852) to oppose the project to create a Ministry of General Police. He did not regularity attend sessions, preferring the Cercle agricole to the Palais Bourbon. His term ended on 27 November 1857 and he did not stand again in the 1857 elections.

== Personal life ==
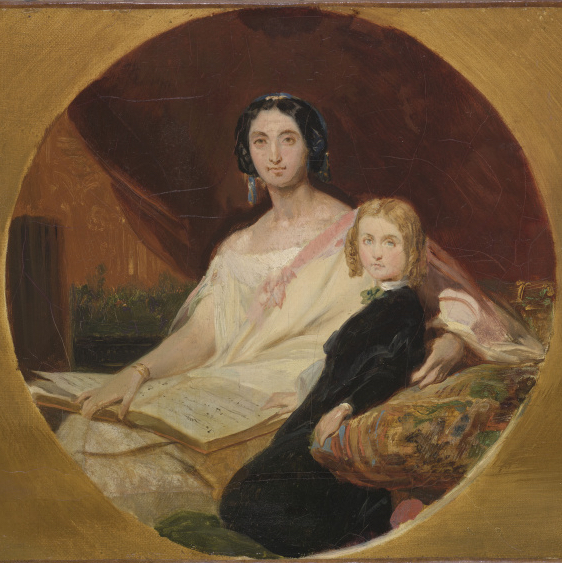
Portraits of the Duchess of Uzès, née Talhouët, and her eldest son, Jacques Emmanuel, by Léon Cogniet

On 28 March 1836, he was married to Françoise Élisabeth Antoinette Sophie de Talhouët-Roy (1818–1863), a daughter of Auguste-Frédéric de Talhouët, Marquis de Talhouët, and the former Alexandrine Roy (daughter and heiress of Count Antoine Roy). Together, they had five children:

- Laure Françoise Victoire de Crussol (1838–1897), who married Count Joseph Philippe Léopold Vogt von Hunolstein in 1857; she died in the fire at the Bazar de la Charité.
- Amable Antoine Jacques Emmanuel de Crussol (1840–1878), who married Anne de Rochechouart de Mortemart, heiress of her great-grandmother, Madame Clicquot Ponsardin (founder of the Veuve Clicquot), in 1867.
- Frédéric Jacques de Crussol (1841–1859), who died accidentally while attending the École navale.
- Élisabeth Olive Emmanuelle de Crussol (1843–1877), who married the Marquis Louis Marie Hector de Galard de Béarn in 1865.
- Mathilde Honorée Emmanuelle de Crussol (1850–1913), who died unmarried.

The Duke died in Paris on 22 March 1872.

=== Residences ===
The Duke inherited, and acquired, a number of properties in France, including the Hôtel de Vaudreuil in the 7th arrondissement of Paris at 7 Rue de la Chaise. Between 1847 and 1849, he used part of his wife's fortune to have the Château de Bonnelles built in the Louis XIII style by the architects Joseph-Antoine Froelicher and Clément Parent, on a vast hunting estate inherited from his father.

French nobility
Preceded by Marie-François-Emmanuel de Crussol d'Uzès	Duke of Uzès; 1842–1872	Succeeded by Emmanuel de Crussol d'Uzès
