= Henri Parent =

French architect (1819–1895)

Aubert Henri Joseph Parent
- Born: April 12, 1819; Valenciennes, Nord, Hauts-de-France, France
- Died: 1895 (aged 75–76); Paris, France
- Occupation: Architect
- Buildings: Boulevard Haussmann

Aubert Henri Joseph Parent (French pronunciation: [obɛʁ‿ ɑ̃ʁi ʒozɛf paʁɑ̃te]; 12 April 1819 – 1895) was a French architect.

== Biography ==
Aubert Henri Joseph Parent was born on 12 April 1819 in Valenciennes, Nord, Hauts-de-France. His brother, Clément was the son in-law of Joseph-Antoine Froelicher.

Parent restored and transformed several hôtels particuliers in the Faubourg Saint-Germain for high aristocratic families. He worked on the Hôtel de Boisgelin, located at 47 rue de Varenne (VIIe arrondissement), and transformed it for the Dukes of Doudeauville and of Bisaccia. He put up panelling originally in the Château de Bercy, and creating a chapel, a winter garden, a dining room, stables for 25 horses, two rooms for 8 carriages, two cellars and a grand staircase ("escalier d'honneur") panelled with polychromatic marble plaques, which was inspired by the queen's staircase at the Palace of Versailles. The building now houses the Italian embassy in France.

Parent also created three luxurious Persian residences:

- Hôtel particulier 158 Boulevard Haussmann (VIIIe arrondissement), in the Neoclassical style, for Édouard André (1833–1894) from 1867–1874 (today the Musée Jacquemart-André).
- Hôtel particulier 5, Avenue Van Dyck (VIIIe arrondissement), in the Eclectic style with ornaments sculpted by Jules Dalou, for the industrialist Émile Menier from 1870–1872 (today a private residence).
- Hôtel particulier 8, Rue Alfred de Vigny (VIIIe arrondissement), Neo Gothic in style, for Henri Menier in 1880 (today the Conservatoire international de musique).

Parent designed Émile-Justin Menier's tomb, one of the most remarkable in the Cimetière du Père-Lachaise (1887). He came second (after Charles Garnier) in the competition to design the new Opéra de Paris.

With his brother Clément, he restored the châteaux of Ancy-le-Franc for the Clermont-Tonnerre, Esclimont and Bonnetable families.

Parent died in 1895 in Paris.
