= Adrien-Louis de Bonnières, duc de Guînes =

French Army general, aristocrat and diplomat

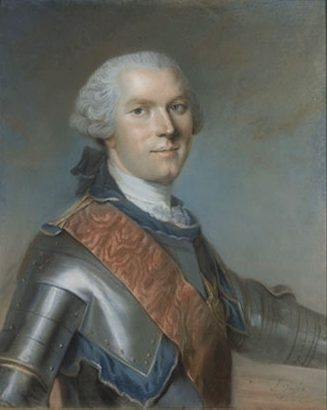
Portrait of Adrien-Louis de Bonnières painted by Louis Vigée

Ancestral arms de Guînes

Adrien-Louis de Bonnières, comte (count) and later duc (duke) de Guînes (14 April 1735, in Lille – 21 December 1806, in Paris) was an aristocrat of the Ancien Régime, who served as a French Army general and diplomat; he was also a favourite of Queen Marie-Antoinette.

== Career ==
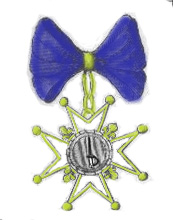
Chevalier du Mérite militaire

Commissioned into the Grenadiers à Cheval de la Garde Impériale, he saw active service commanding the Royal Navarre Cavalry Regiment during the Seven Years' War. Appointed in 1762 Brigadier-General de Bonnières was promoted Maréchal de camp in 1770.

After his father died in 1763, he was accorded the courtesy title of comte de Guînes and embarked upon a diplomatic career, both buoyed and hampered by a dry wit. "It was a most lively animated gazette," the comtesse de Genlis who was smitten and let it be known after a visit to the Prince of Conti in 1766, where de Guînes was present: "his whole reputation hangs on a manner of spying out all the little ridiculous trifles and of an ill-grace, which he relates in few words with an amusing manner." A protégé of Choiseul and Noailles, and a friend of Frederick II of Prussia whom he had met in 1766, the count was dispatched as ambassador to Berlin in 1768. Still, soon fell out of favour with some Prussian courtiers to such an extent that he was recalled in November 1769.

As a consolation, upon Queen Marie-Antoinette's instigation, he was appointed Ambassador to the Court of St James's the following year, and remained in that post, with periodic visits to Versailles, until 1776. His reputation in London was excellent, in stark contrast to his predecessors Châtelet, Guerchy and Durand de Linois. Although his affair with Lady Elizabeth Craven became well known this was mostly overlooked given her acclaimed beauty and charm. It was said of him that when the noon gun was fired, and someone in his entourage asked what that was, the count quipped, "I think they've sighted the sun"! He gained a wider notoriety with the awkward "Guînes affair" requiring him to press charges, 20 April 1771, against his private secretary, Barthélemy Tort de La Sonde, who he asserted used his name in speculating with and thereby misappropriating French government funds. Tort, on being arrested, claimed that he had acted upon de Guînes' directions and for his account. In Paris, on 6 June 1771 Armand, duc d'Aiguillon (Secretary of State for Foreign Affairs), took Tort's side ill-advisedly, whereas the Queen defended her friend de Guînes, and antagonistic parties of Choiseul and Aiguillon took up the affair. De Guînes was eventually proven not guilty, by a narrow margin, in a specially convened Council of State commanded by King Louis XVI. The trial's aftermath rankled; it was among the reasons for the dismissal of Aiguillon, having incurred the Queen's and others' lasting displeasure.

Collar of the Saint-Esprit

On his return to France he was created Duc de Guînes and remained in royal favour, being appointed Chevalier of the Order of the Holy Spirit on 1 January 1784. A Knight of Malta through his family, he also received the Mérite militaire and Grand Cross of Saint-Louis.

He was appointed to the Council of War in 1787, and Governor of Artois in 1788. On the eve of the French Revolution, De Guînes was nominated to the Second Assembly of Notables which sat from 6 November to 12 December 1788. Having returned to England at the outbreak of the French Revolution, he returned under the Consulate and died at Hôtel de Castries, Paris in 1806.

Duc de Guînes and his friend King Frederick of Prussia were both accomplished flautists and they commissioned from Mozart the familiar Concerto for Flute and Harp (K. 299), written in 1778. Mozart was engaged as tutor to the duke's daughter, Marie-Adrienne, but was somewhat frustrated to discover she didn't seem to share her father's musical ability; when Amadeus requested payment, the duke's head butler is reported to have settled at half the agreed amount: "There's noble treatment for you,.." Mozart wrote to his father.

== Family ==
Descended from the ancient Artois family of the comtes de Guisnes, he was the son of Guy-Louis de Bonnières, comte de Souâtre (died 1763), by his wife Adrienne-Louise-Isabelle (died 1794), daughter of Adrien-Frédéric de Melun, marquis de Cottènes.

In 1753, he married Caroline-Françoise-Philippine, daughter of Louis-François-Joseph, Prince de Montmorency-Longny; their only daughter Marie-Adrienne married in 1778 Charles de La Croix de Castries who was created Duc de Castries in 1784, with special remainder to the Guînes dukedom (although this expired when his wife predeceased her father). One of De Guînes' brothers-in-law was Charles-François de Broglie, marquis de Ruffec.

The Dowager Duchess died in 1810.

== See also ==
- Château de Guînes
- List of Ambassadors of France to Germany
- List of Ambassadors of France to Great Britain
