= Louis Victoire Lux de Montmorin-Saint-Hérem =

Italian military man

Louis Victoire Lux de Montmorin-Saint-Hérem (1762–1792) was a French military man who was impaled to death during the September Massacres of the French Revolution.

He sent a letter to George Washington, written in Paris on the 19th of September, 1971 informing him and the senate that they have accepted the constitution which had before been presented to them.
