= Clément Parent =

French architect

François Clément Joseph Parent (French pronunciation: [fʁɑ̃swa klemɑ̃ ʒozɛf paʁɑ̃]; 1823–1884) was a French architect. Among his work was the castle at Ooidonk. With his brother Henri Parent, he restored the châteaux of Ancy-le-Franc for the Clermont-Tonnerre, Esclimont and Bonnetable families. One of his pupils was the Hungarian Ödön Lechner.

== Biography ==
The son of architect Aubert Parent (1753–1835), Clément Parent was the son-in-law of architect Joseph-Antoine Froelicher (1790–1866), whose daughter, Louise Marie, he married.

Together with his older brother Henri Parent (1819–1895), he restored the châteaux of Ancy-le-Franc for the House of Clermont-Tonnerre, and those of Esclimont and Bonnétable for the Duke of Doudeauville, who also commissioned him to restore his Parisian mansion—now the Italian Embassy—at 47–49 Hôtel de Boisgelin (Rue de Varenne, Paris).

Between 1847 and 1849, together with his father-in-law Froelicher, he built the present-day Château de Bonnelles (Yvelines) for Géraud de Crussol, 11th Duke of Uzès (1808–1872), the 11th Duke of Uzès.

Around 1854, he built the cloister and the Neo-Gothic chapel—which no longer exists—of the Hôtel de Montesquiou on Rue Monsieur in Paris for the Benedictine Nuns of Perpetual Adoration of the Blessed Sacrament of the Blessed Sacrament, who wished to inter there the remains of their foundress, Louise Adélaïde de Bourbon (1757–1824).

In 1857, Antoine Thomson d'Abbadie commissioned him to draw up plans for a castle “in the pointed-arch style” to be built in Hendaye. In 1858, a circular astronomical observatory was built, which was later demolished to make way for the current rectangular building. In 1859, the general plan was finalized, but the following year, Parent was dismissed, apparently because he could not produce plans that were sufficiently “Neo-Gothic” like those d’Abbadie had seen in England. The current Château d’Abbadia was ultimately built by the firm of Eugène Viollet-le-Duc.

Around 1860, he built the Château de Bournel in Cubry in the Neo-Gothic style for the Marquis Lionel de Moustier.

In 1862–1863, he oversaw the construction of the Hôtel de Montigny at 40 Rue Barbet-de-Jouy in Paris.

The Château de Saint-Aignan, located in Saint-Denis-de-l'Hôtel in the Loiret department, was built according to his plans between 1866 and 1869.
