= Lamoignon =

Lamoignon is the name of a French noble family:

- Famille de Lamoignon (French article, use translate option to view in English)
- Guillaume de Lamoignon (1617–1677), lawyer
- Nicolas de Lamoignon (1648–1724), Guillaume's second son, public official
- Chrétien François de Lamoignon de Basville (1735–1789)
- Guillaume-Chrétien de Lamoignon de Malesherbes (1721–1794), official
