= Anne de Rochechouart de Mortemart =

French aristocrat (1847–1933)

Anne de Rochechouart
- Duchess of Uzès
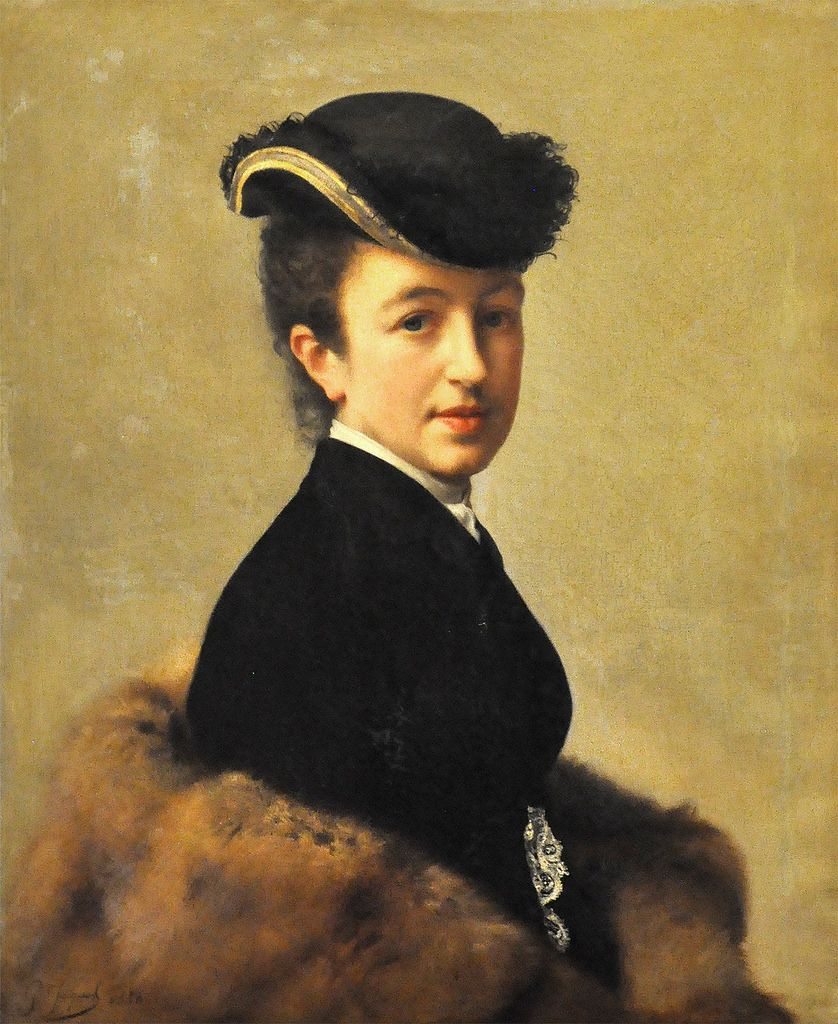
- Duchesse d'Uzès c. 1896
- Born: Marie Adrienne Anne Victurnienne Clémentine de Rochechouart; 10 February 1847; Paris, France
- Died: 3 February 1933 (aged 85); Dampierre-en-Yvelines, France
- Spouse: Emmanuel de Crussol (m. 1867; died 1878)
- Issue: Jacques Marie Géraud; Louis Emmanuel; Simone Louise Laure; Mathilde Renée
- Father: Louis de Rochechouart, Count of Mortemart
- Mother: Marie Clémentine de Chevigné

Anne de Rochechouart (Marie Adrienne Anne Victurnienne Clémentine; 10 February 1847 – 3 February 1933), was a wealthy French aristocrat. She inherited a large fortune from her great-grandmother, the founder of the Veuve Clicquot Champagne house. She was known for her involvement in feminist causes and charities, politics, sport hunting, automobiles, and the arts, and was also an author and sculptor, the latter using the name Manuela.

== Early life ==
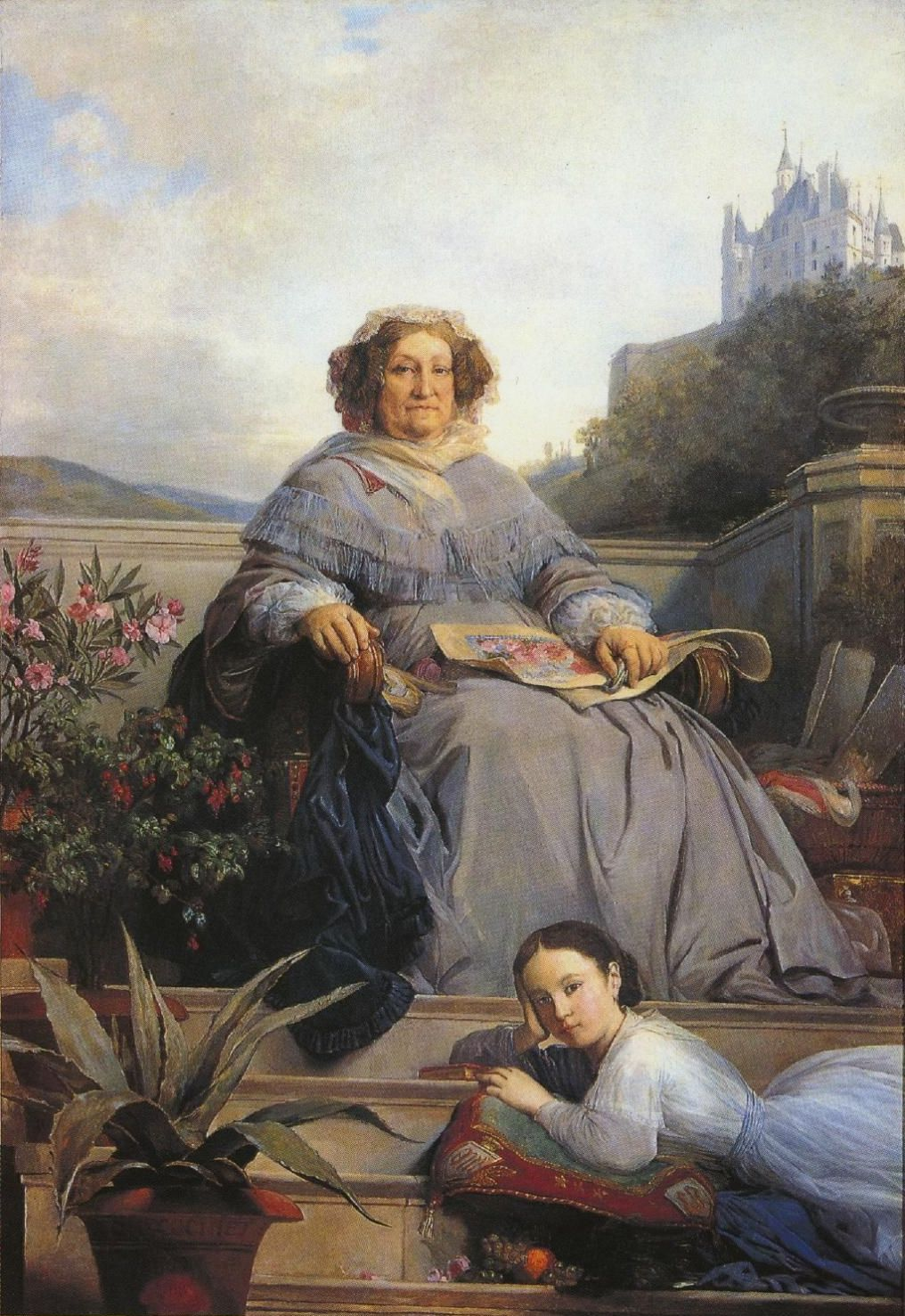
Anne with her great-grandmother, Madame Clicquot Ponsardin, founder of Veuve Clicquot

Marie Adrienne Anne Victurnienne Clémentine de Rochechouart was born on 10 February 1847 in Paris. She was the daughter of Louis de Rochechouart, Count of Mortemart, and Marie Clémentine de Chevigné (died 24 October 1877).

The Neo-Renaissance style Château de Boursault, designed by the architect Arveuf, was built by Madame Clicquot Ponsardin, founder of the Veuve Clicquot Champagne house, in honor of the marriage of her granddaughter Marie Clémentine to Louis de Mortemart-Rochechouart in 1839.

Anne inherited the chateau on Madame Clicquot's death in 1866.

=== Marriage ===
On 10 May 1867, Anne married Emmanuel de Crussol (1840–1878), 12th Duke of Uzès. He was elected to the legislature in 1871, sat on the right and voted against the creation of the Republic. Their children were:

1. Jacques Marie Géraud de Crussol (1868–1893), who became the 13th Duke before his death in 1893 during an expedition that he was leading in Africa.
2. Simone Louise Laure de Crussol (1870–1946), who married Honoré d'Albert, 10th Duke of Luynes (1868–1924); parents of Philippe d'Albert de Luynes, 11th Duke of Luynes.
3. Louis Emmanuel de Crussol (1871–1943), who became the 14th Duke after his brother's death in 1893; he married Marie Thérèse d'Albert de Luynes, a first cousin of his sister's husband (both grandchildren of Honoré-Louis d'Albert de Luynes). He later married American Josephine Angela (1886–1966) in 1939. Their grandson, Emmanuel de Crussol d'Uzès, became the 15th Duke of Uzès in 1943.
4. Mathilde Renée de Crussol (1875–1908), who married François de Cossé Brissac, 11th Duke of Brissac.

On her husband's death in 1878 Anne remained dowager Duchess of Uzès. She became "a sportswoman, an author, an artist, a sculptor, a chauffeuse, a ministering angel to the poor, a grande mondaine, and an industrious mother."

== Career and philanthropy ==
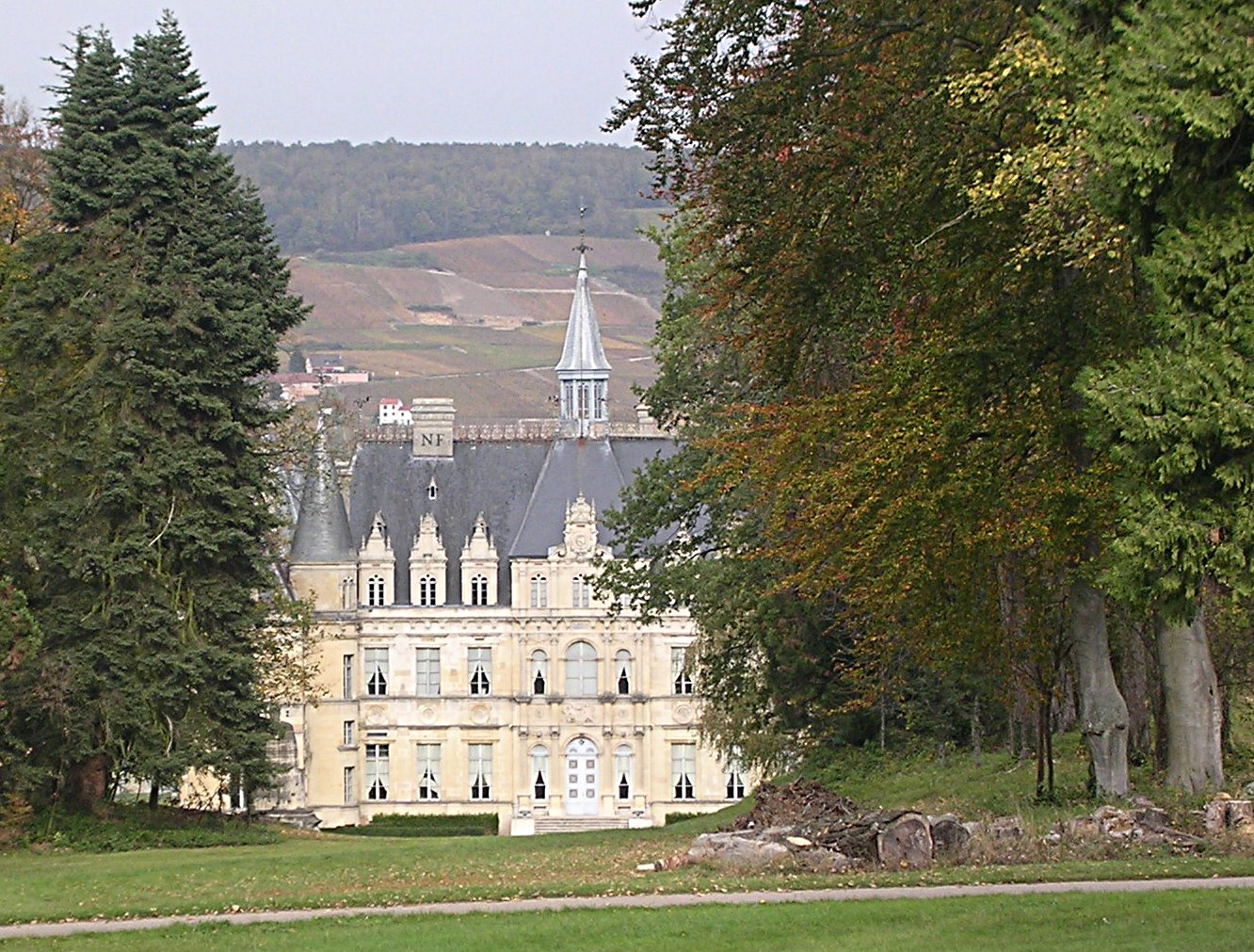
Château de Boursault

The Duchess of Uzès was a strong supporter of the conservative and royalist politician Georges Ernest Boulanger (1837–1891), and donated more than three million francs to his cause, a large sum at the time. She convinced Prince Philippe, Count of Paris to support Boulanger in the hope of a restoration of the monarchy. The Duchess of Uzès provided support to the Fédération nationale des Jaunes de France. The "Jaune" movement was organized to break trade union strikes. She also financed several antisemitic newspapers. Later she dropped her opposition to the Republican administration. She became a friend of the anarchist Louise Michel.

The Duchess of Uzès was active in Paris society, and participated in many charities. She also became involved in feminist and suffragist causes.

In January 1893, Jeanne Schmahl founded the Avant-Courrière (Forerunner) association, which called for the right of women to be witnesses in public and private acts, and for the right of married women to take the product of their labor and dispose of it freely. The campaign aimed to mobilize middle- and upper-class women who had moderate and conservative views. Anne de Rochechouart de Mortemart and Juliette Adam (1836–1936) soon joined the Avant-Courrière, and Schmahl found support from Jane Misme (1865–1935), who later founded the journal La Française and Jeanne Chauvin (1862–1926), the first woman to become a doctor of law. The Duchess of Uzès was president of the National League for Improving Rural and Agricultural Industries (Ligue nationale pour le relèvement des industries rurales at agricoles).

During World War I (1914–18) she let the army use her Château de Bonnelles, which became an annex of the Rambouillet surgery hospital. At the age of 70 she took the examinations to become head nurse. She played a personal role in organizing care for the wounded. She also founded a child care school, and became a member of the Anti-Cancer League, helping to gain support for the league from her wide network of influential people.

=== Leisure activities ===
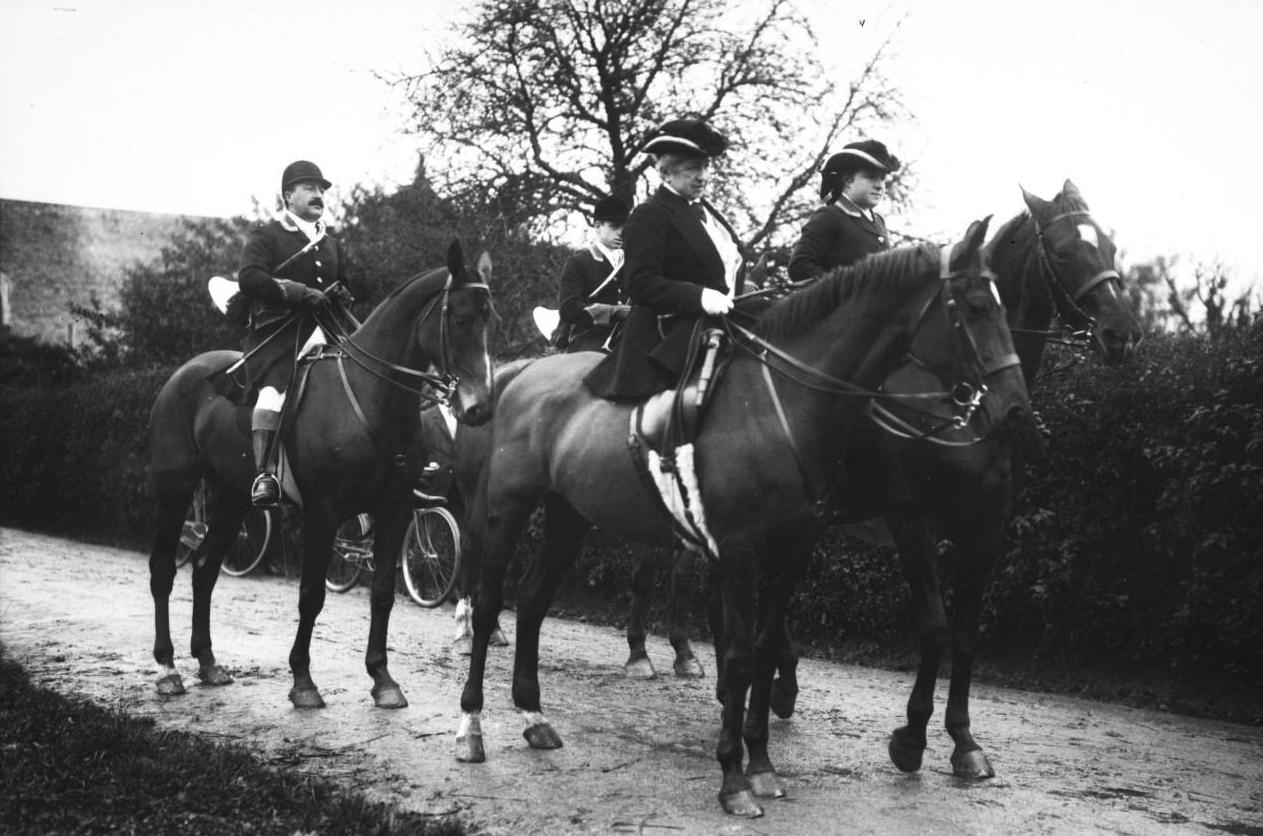
Duchesse d'Uzès hunting at Rambouillet (1913)

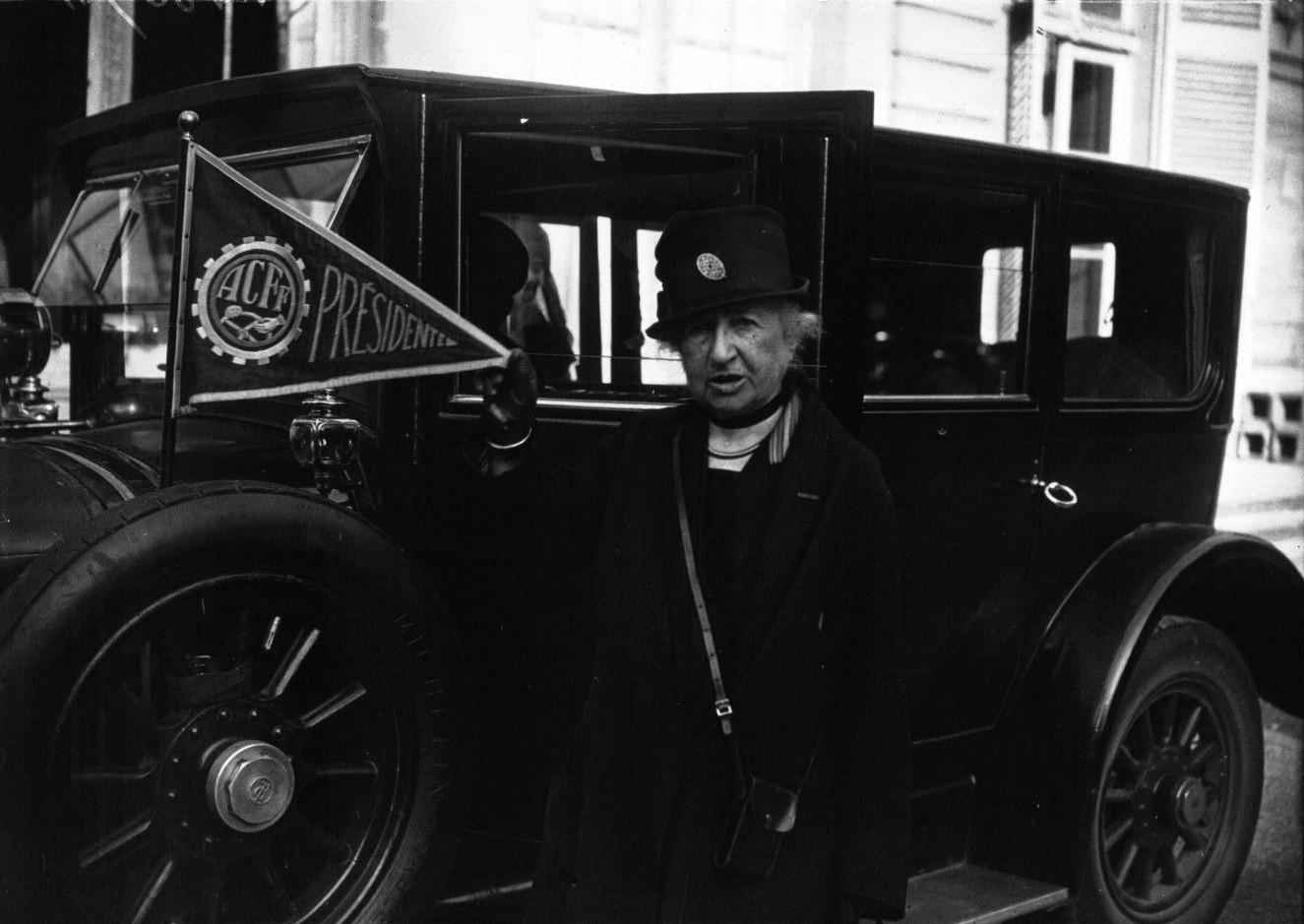
Duchesse d'Uzès, President of the Women's Automobile Club (1927)

The Duchess of Uzès was keen on sport hunting, and led the Rallye Bonnelles in the Rambouillet forest from the 1880s until her death. This caused her to be expelled from the Animal Protection Society. "Kings, princes and presidents of the Republic" attended the hunts that she arranged at her estate of Bonnelles. When aged 80, in July 1926 she took her oath at the Rambouillet Civil Court as Lieutenant de Louveterie, an official position related to regulation of hunting.

In 1889 The Epoch (New York) wrote, "The Duchess, who is now a little over forty, is short and dumpy, and appears to best advantage when on horseback. She has a kindly, intelligent face, chestnut hair and laughing blue eyes... It was at Bonnelles that the Duchess received the Empress of Austria, who expressed her surprise and admiration at seeing a hunt organised and conducted by a woman with as much skill and perfection as though it had been arranged by a Master of the Hounds. At Paris the Duchess of Uzes inhabits the splendid mansion in the Champs-Élysées, once belonging to Queen Christine, of Spain, and where the ornamented ceilings are by Fortuny..."

The Duchess of Uzès was one of the first clients of Émile Delahaye, a pioneer of the automobile industry. In 1898, she was the first women in France to obtain a driver's license, and in 1899 was the first to receive a speeding ticket. She had driven at 15 kilometres per hour (9.3 mph) in the Bois de Boulogne where the speed limit was 12 kilometres per hour (7.5 mph). She was president of the Aeroclub Ladies' Committee and of the Automobile Club féminin de France and a member of Aéroclub féminin la Stella, founded by Marie Surcouf.

=== Artistic endeavors ===
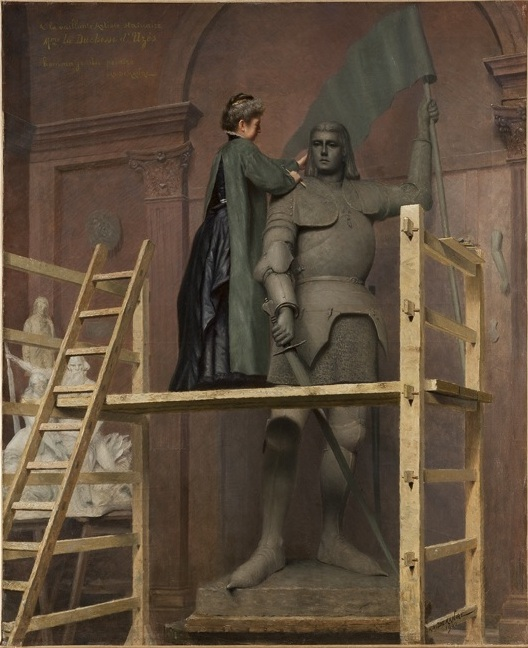
Duchess of Uzès working on a sculpture of Jeanne D’Arc (1900), by Adolphe Demange

The Duchess wrote and published poems, plays, novels and histories.

She painted and sculpted, using the pseudonym "Manuela". Her work was exhibited at the Société des Artistes Français, and she received an honorable mention in the 1887 Salon. The Duchess of Uzès was a friend of the sculptor Jean-Alexandre-Josef Falguière (1831–1900), who gave her lessons. She made sculptures of Diana, Émile Augier, Nicolas Gilbert, Notre-Dame de France (the Virgin Mary), Saint Hubert and Joan of Arc. She became president of the Union of Female Painters. She was also president of the women's Lyceum Club of France (Lycéum-Club de France).

A 1900 painting by Adolphe Demange (1857–1928) shows her working on a monumental clay statue of Joan of Arc in Falguière's studio. The painting is signed "To the valiant artist-sculptor Mme La Duchesse d’Uzès, tribute of the painter A.D. Demange." The sculpture was the model for a cast iron and bronze statue that stood in the Place du Château at Mehun-sur-Yèvre until 1944, when it was destroyed by the German army.

== Literary works ==
- Anne de Rochechouart de Mortemart (1890). Le cœur et le sang. Drama in three acts, under her pseudonym of Mme. Manuela.
- Anne de Rochechouart de Mortemart (1894). Le voyage de mon fils au Congo.
- Anne de Rochechouart de Mortemart (1907). Histoires de chasse par Madame la Duchesse d'Uzès née Mortemart. Watercolors by Maurice Leloir. Éditions d'art de la Phosphatine Fallières.
- Anne de Rochechouart de Mortemart (1909). Paillettes grises. A. Lemerre.
- Anne de Rochechouart de Mortemart (1916). Rêver (page manuscrite datée de 1909). Paris Librairie Delagrave.
- Anne de Rochechouart de Mortemart (1911). Poèmes de la duchesse Anne. La Poétique.
- Anne de Rochechouart de Mortemart (1922). Paillettes mauves. A. Lemerre.
- Anne de Rochechouart de Mortemart (1939). Souvenirs de la duchesse d'Uzès, née Mortemart. Preface by her grandson Count de Cossé-Brissac. Plon.

== Sources ==
- "A Duchess Of All Trades". Carlton Hobbs LLC. Archived from the original on 2015-02-14.
- Almanach de Gotha. Justus Perthes. 1891.
- "Anne la Duchesse d'Uzès". geneanet.
- Benoist, Jacques (2000). Le Sacré-Coeur des femmes: De 1870 à 1960. Contribution à l'histoire du féminisme, de l'urbanisme et du tourisme (in French). Editions de l'Atelier. ISBN 978-2-7082-3498-7.
- "Histoire". Duché d'Uzès.
- "La Duchesse D'Uzès". Nemausensis.
- Metz, Annie (December 2007). "Jeanne Schmahl et la loi sur le libre salaire de la femme". Bulletin du Archives du Féminisme (in French) (13).
- Pinell, Patrice (2003-08-27). The Fight Against Cancer: France 1890-1940. Routledge. ISBN 978-1-134-46757-0.
- Seymour, Charles (1889-02-09). "The Feminine Enthusiasm for General Boulanger". Epoch. Epoch publishing Company.
- "Sporting Duchess now 80". Central News. 13 August 1926.
- Vassor, Bernard (2008-07-08). "Duchess of Uzes, NEE Adrienne Marie-Anne-Clementine Victurnienne ROCHECHOUART-MORTEMART".
