= Hurepoix =

Area of the Île-de-France, France

Coordinates: 48.55°N 2.02°E

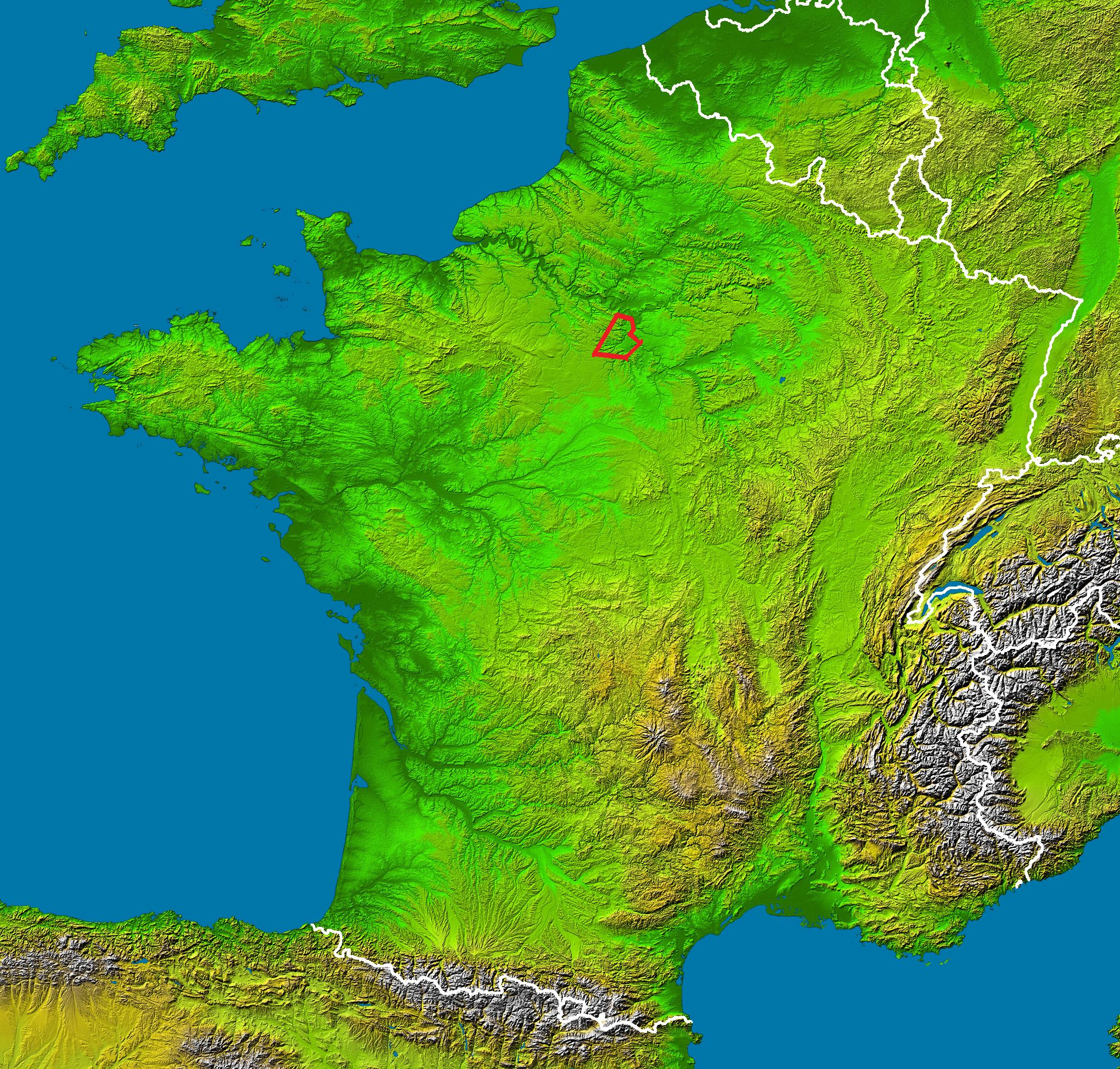
Location of Hurepoix in France

Hurepoix (French pronunciation: [yʁpwa]) is an area of the Île-de-France, to the southwest of Paris, situated between the departments of Yvelines, Hauts-de-Seine and Essonne. It was an old province of the French Kingdom and the main city was Dourdan. The name appears to come from the old French words for wild boar, hure and bristles, poil.

== Geography ==
This area is one of the biggest of the Île-de-France.

Limits :

- North : Paris, by the Paris Observatory
- West : Rambouillet and forest
- East : Seine, Brie province, Fontainebleau and forest
- South : Beauce province

Main cities

- Dourdan
- Limours
- Orsay
- Massy
- Montlhéry
- Palaiseau

Main rivers

- Yvette
- Bièvre
- Essonne
- Orge

Main forest

- Dourdan
- Verrières-le-Buisson

Main Castles

This area is not far from Versailles, and the castle of Louis XIV. In this period, Princes and Dukes built castles not far, in Hurepoix.

- Chamarande
- Breteuil
- Courson
- Dampierre
- Dourdan
- Sceaux
- Saint Jean de Beauregard

== Economy ==
The economy of the west part of the area consists of farming, as in the past. The economy of the eastern part is more industrial.
