= Bonnelles =

- Commune
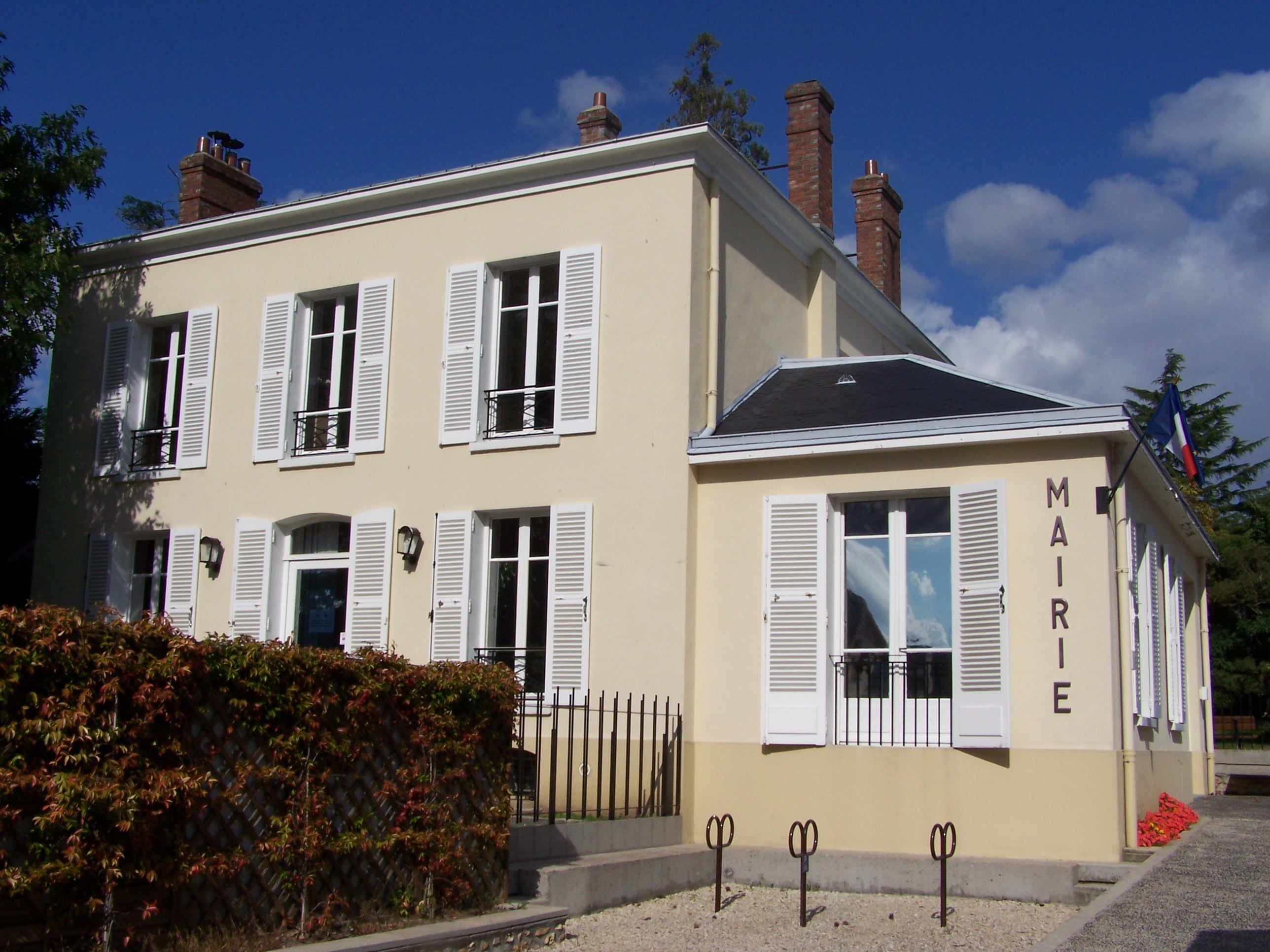
- Town hall

- Coat of arms
- Location of Bonnelles
- Location within France Location within Île-de-France (region)
- Coordinates: 48°37′08″N 2°01′41″E
- Country: France
- Region: Île-de-France
- Department: Yvelines
- Arrondissement: Rambouillet
- Canton: Rambouillet
- Intercommunality: CA Rambouillet Territoires

Government
  - Mayor (2024–2026): Nathalie Couëdor
- Area^{1}: 10.84 km^{2} (4.19 sq mi)
- Elevation: 116 m (381 ft)
- Highest elevation: 177 m (581 ft)
- Lowest elevation: 92 m (302 ft)
- Population (2023): 2,165
  - Density: 199.7/km^{2} (517.3/sq mi)
- Time zone: UTC+01:00 (CET)
  - Summer (DST): UTC+02:00 (CEST)
- INSEE/Postal code: 78087 /78830
- ^{1} French Land Register data, which excludes lakes, ponds, glaciers > 1 km^{2} (0.386 sq mi or 247 acres) and river estuaries.

Bonnelles (French: [bɔnɛl]) is a commune in the Yvelines department in north-central France.

== Population ==
Historical population
Year	Pop.	±% p.a.
1968	546	—
1975	595	+1.24%
1982	1,371	+12.66%
1990	2,193	+6.05%
1999	2,162	−0.16%
2007	2,035	−0.75%
2012	1,931	−1.04%
2017	1,963	+0.33%
2023	2,165	+1.65%
Source: INSEE

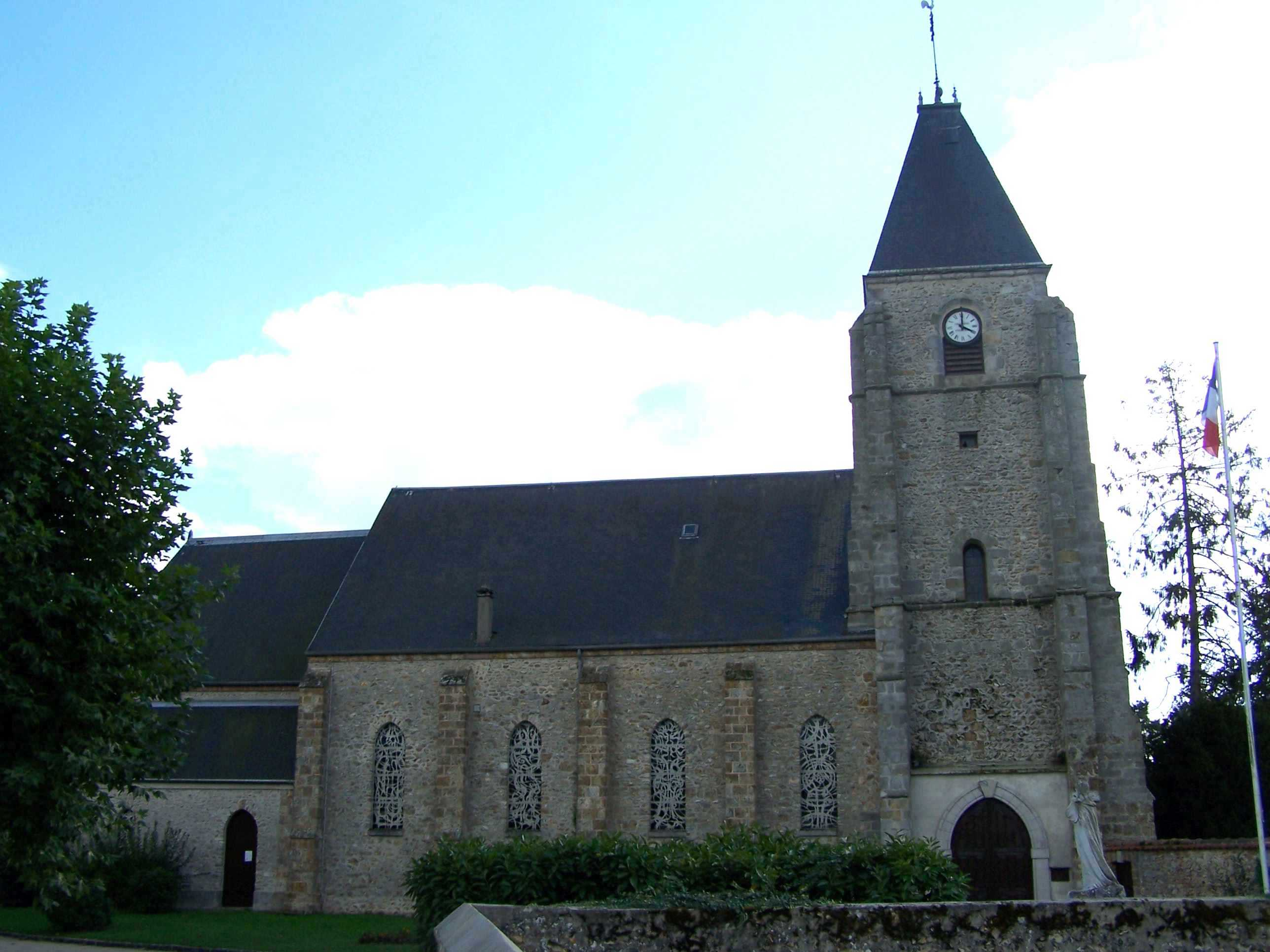
The church

== See also ==
- Communes of the Yvelines department
- Château de Bonnelles
