= Joseph-Antoine Froelicher =

Swiss architect

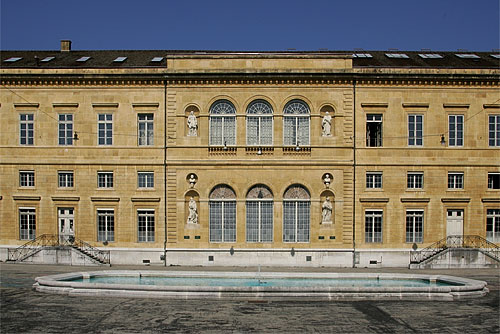
Collège Latin, Neuenburg

Josef Anton or Joseph-Antoine Froelicher or Frölicher (2 November 1790 – 9 January 1866, Paris) was a Swiss architect.

== Biography ==
Coming from an old middle-class family from Solothurn, Froelicher begins his architectural studies in Switzerland, receiving his degree in Solothurn in 1809. He then left for Paris, endowed with a pension from the Swiss government to complete his studies in Paris. He entered the école des Beaux-Arts in 1809, gallicizing his name into Joseph Antoine Frelicher, then Froelicher.

Architect to many families of the high French aristocracy, he built many châteaux and hôtels particuliers. A Legitimist monarchist, he became the official architect to the duchess of Berry, which brought him much ill-feeling at the time of the July Revolution. He was made a naturalised Frenchman in 1821, and his daughter married the architect Henri Parent.
