= Jacques de Crussol, 13th Duke of Uzès =

French nobleman and explorer (1868–1893)

Jacques de Crussol
- 13th Duke of Uzès
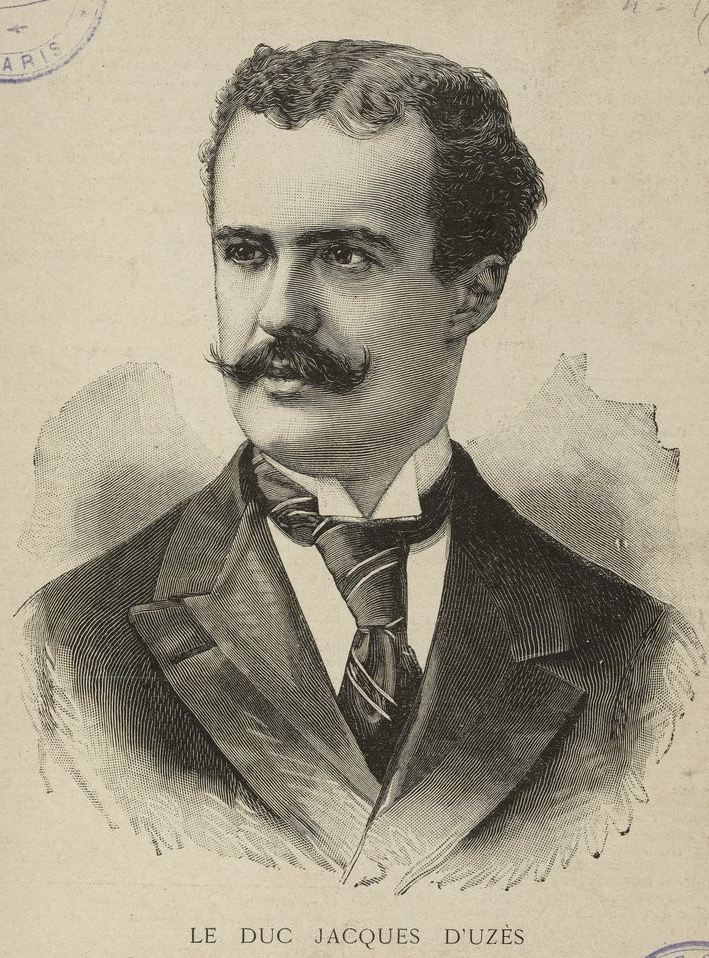
- Born: Jacques Marie Géraud de Crussol; 19 November 1868; Paris, France
- Died: 20 June 1893 (aged 24); Cabinda, Portuguese Congo
- Cause of death: Dysentery
- Noble family: Crussol
- Father: Jacques Emmanuel de Crussol d'Uzès
- Mother: Anne de Rochechouart de Mortemart

Jacques Marie Géraud de Crussol (19 November 1868 – 20 June 1893), styled Duke of Crussol from 1872 to 1878, was a French nobleman and explorer who kept a diary of his African expedition that was published posthumously by his mother, the renowned Duchess d'Uzès.

== Early life ==
Crussol was born in the 7th arrondissement of Paris on 19 November 1868. He was the eldest son of Emmanuel de Crussol, 12th Duke of Uzès (1852–1878) and Anne de Rochechouart de Mortemart. His younger brother was Louis Emmanuel de Crussol. His sisters both married Dukes, Simone Louise Laure de Crussol (who married Honoré d'Albert, 10th Duke of Luynes), and Mathilde Renée de Crussol d'Uzès (who married François de Cossé Brissac, 11th Duke of Brissac). His mother inherited the Château de Boursault and a large fortune from her great-grandmother, Madame Clicquot Ponsardin, the founder of the Veuve Clicquot, and his maternal grandparents were Louis de Rochechouart and Marie Clémentine de Chevigné.

His father, who had been elected to the legislature in 1871, died in 1878 and 10 year-old Jacques became the 13th Duke of Uzès and the head of the House of Crussol.

== African expedition ==
Reportedly to teach the young Duke how to escape an idle life, respect his rank, and accomplish great things, his mother decided to organize an expedition to Africa. The goal was to reach Abyssinia in the Horn of Africa and deliver Khartoum, which had been in the hands of the Mahdists since 1884.

The Duchess sent her Jacques, Lt. Émile Julien, Charles Pottier, a journalist from L'Illustration, convoy leader Rogier, and Dr. Jean Hess. Thirty Algerian riflemen accompanied the troops.

The men left Marseille on 26 January 1892, reaching Brazzaville almost six months later on 12 July 1892. In Brazzaville, Albert Dolisie (later the governor of French Congo) convinced the Duke to continue his mission towards Ubangi to reinforce the forces already present there. The intended peaceful mission quickly became a military endeavor and, overwhelmed by the turn, the Duke left his command to Lt. Julien.

On 11 January 1893, they arrived at the Abiras post, joining up with Victor Liotard's forces. A reprisal expedition was organized at the beginning of February to fight the "Boubous" in the Kotto valley, but, at the end of the month, the Duke and Lt. Julien, suffering from fevers, were evacuated to Brazzaville. The young duke died of dysentery in the Portuguese protectorate of Cabinda on 20 June 1893 as he prepared to return to France. After his death, his mother edited and published his journal as My Son's Journey to the Congo (French: Le Voyage de mon fils au Congo).

== Personal life ==
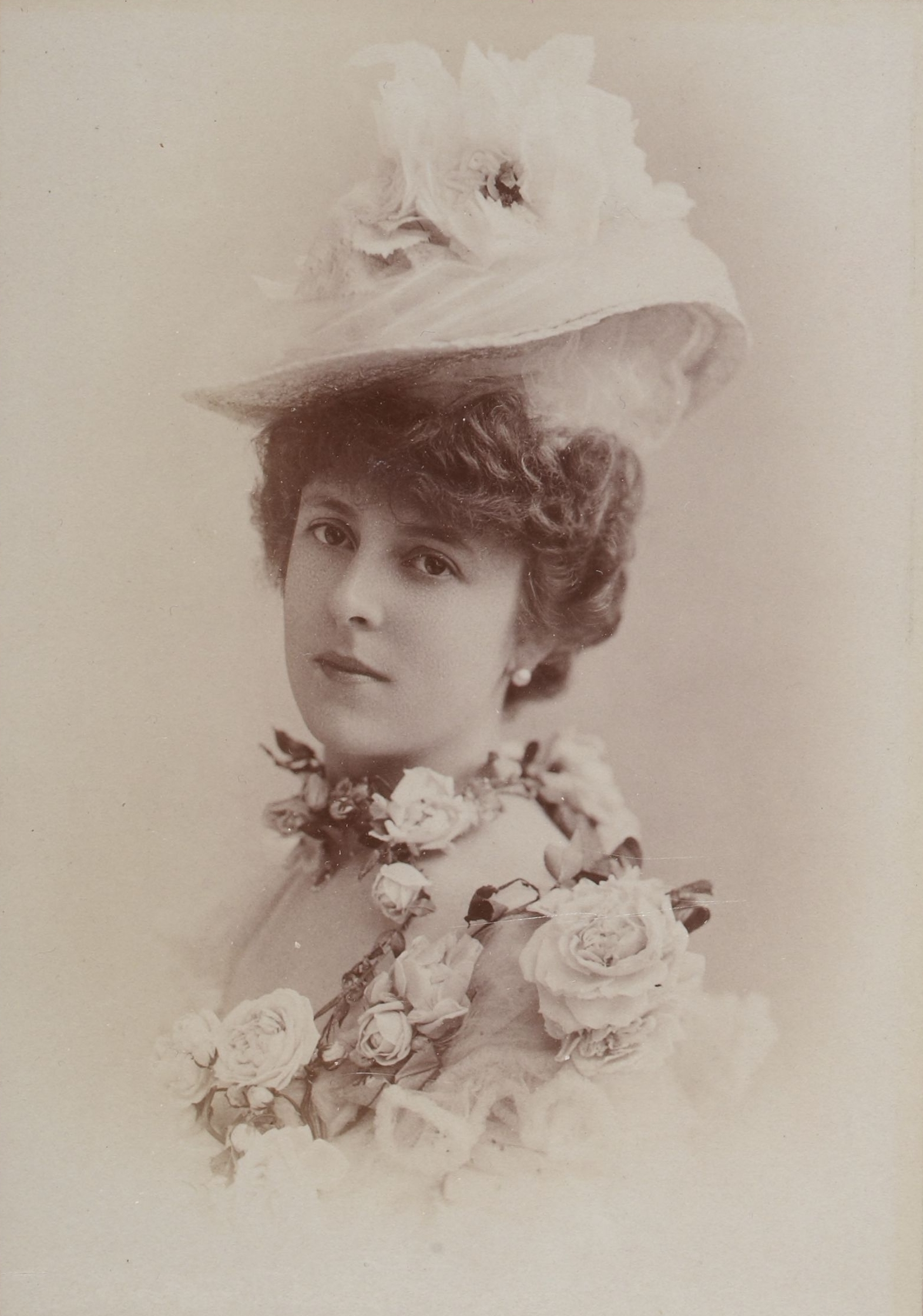
The duke's lover, Émilienne d'Alençon

Crussol was reportedly the lover of the demimonde, Émilienne d'Alençon, whom he wished to marry. Alençon, a dancer and actress, had made her début at the Cirque d'été in 1889. On 26 May 1891, he was present at the ball organized at 25 boulevard des Invalides in the Faubourg Saint-Germain, disguised as a Muscovite lord with Alençon present, which was said to be an impetus for his mother to organize his expedition to Africa.

His body was returned to France, via Lisbon (accompanied by his brother, then styled Count of Crussol, and brother-in-law, the Duke of Luynes), and his funeral was held at the Uzès. After his early death, the dukedom passed to his younger brother, Louis Emmanuel.

French nobility
Preceded by Jacques Emmanuel de Crussol d'Uzès	Duke of Uzès; 1878–1893	Succeeded by Louis Emmanuel de Crussol d'Uzès
