= Jean-Baptiste Auriol =

French circus clown (1806-1881)

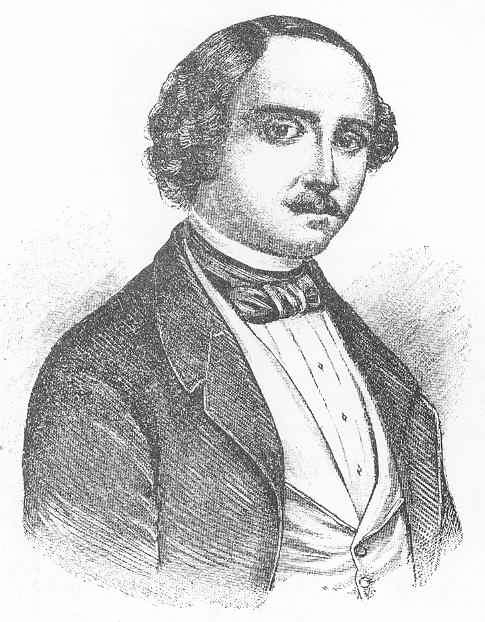
- Born: Jean-Baptiste Auriol; August 11, 1806; Toulouse, France
- Died: August 29, 1881 (aged 75); Paris, France
- Resting place: Passy Cemetery
- Other name: Homme oiseau
- Occupation: Circus performer
- Father: Louis Auriol

Jean-Baptiste Auriol (August 11, 1806 – August 29, 1881) was a French clown, juggler, tightrope walker, and acrobat.

== Early life ==
Jean-Baptiste Auriol was born on August 11, 1806, in Toulouse, France.

His father, Louis Auriol, performed as a tightrope walker and served as manager of the Théâtre du Capitole in Toulouse.

== Career ==
At just six years old, Jean-Baptiste Auriol began his career in the ring, rapidly gaining recognition for his talented and creative routines. Following successful tours through Holland, Germany, Switzerland, and Spain, he joined the renowned Franconi circus in Paris in 1834.

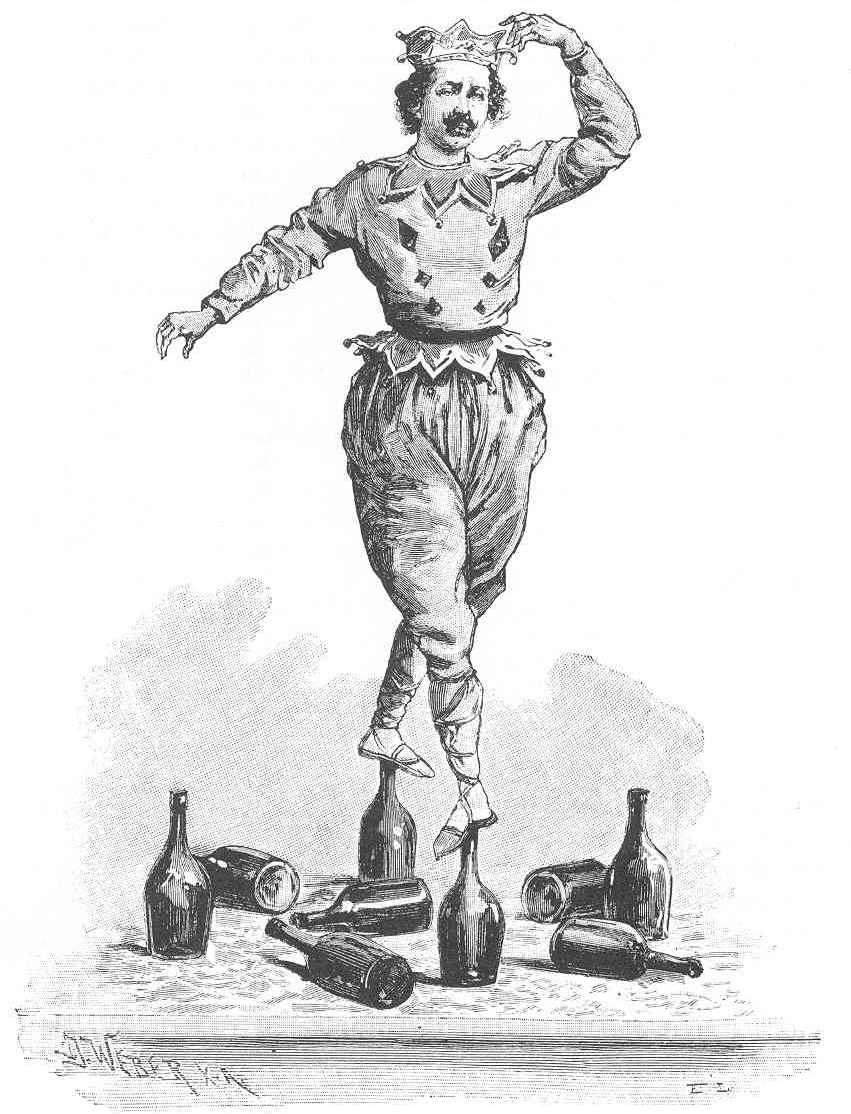
Sketch of Jean-Baptiste Auriol in costume dancing on bottles.

Auriol made his debut at the Cirque Olympique on March 5, 1835. From the early 1840s through 1852, he was employed by Louis Dejean at the Cirque des Champs-Élysées.

He perfected balancing acts throughout the 1830s. Balancing atop bottles, Auriol showcased his dancing and shooting trick abilities. While in London, Auriol appeared at Drury Lane theatre in 1848. He also made an appearance at the Vauxhall Gardens.

He remained actively engaged in his clowning profession until age fifty. Auriol retired from performing around 1865.

== Death ==
Jean-Baptiste Auriol died on August 29, 1881. He was buried in Passy Cemetery in Paris, France.

== Legacy ==
Known as the "First French Clown," Jean-Baptiste Auriol had reigned as France's favorite clown for over thirty years.

== Gallery ==
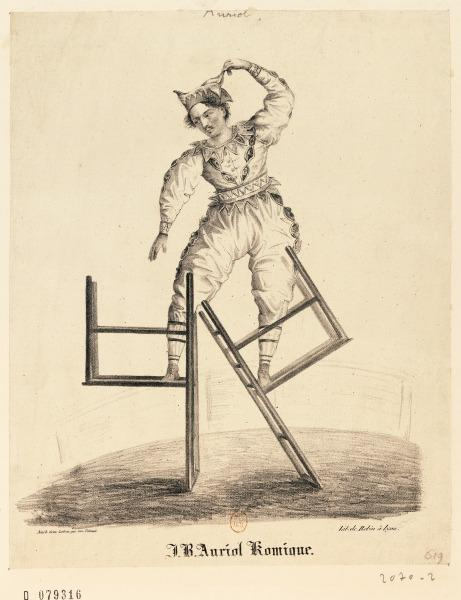
J.B. Auriol, Komique.

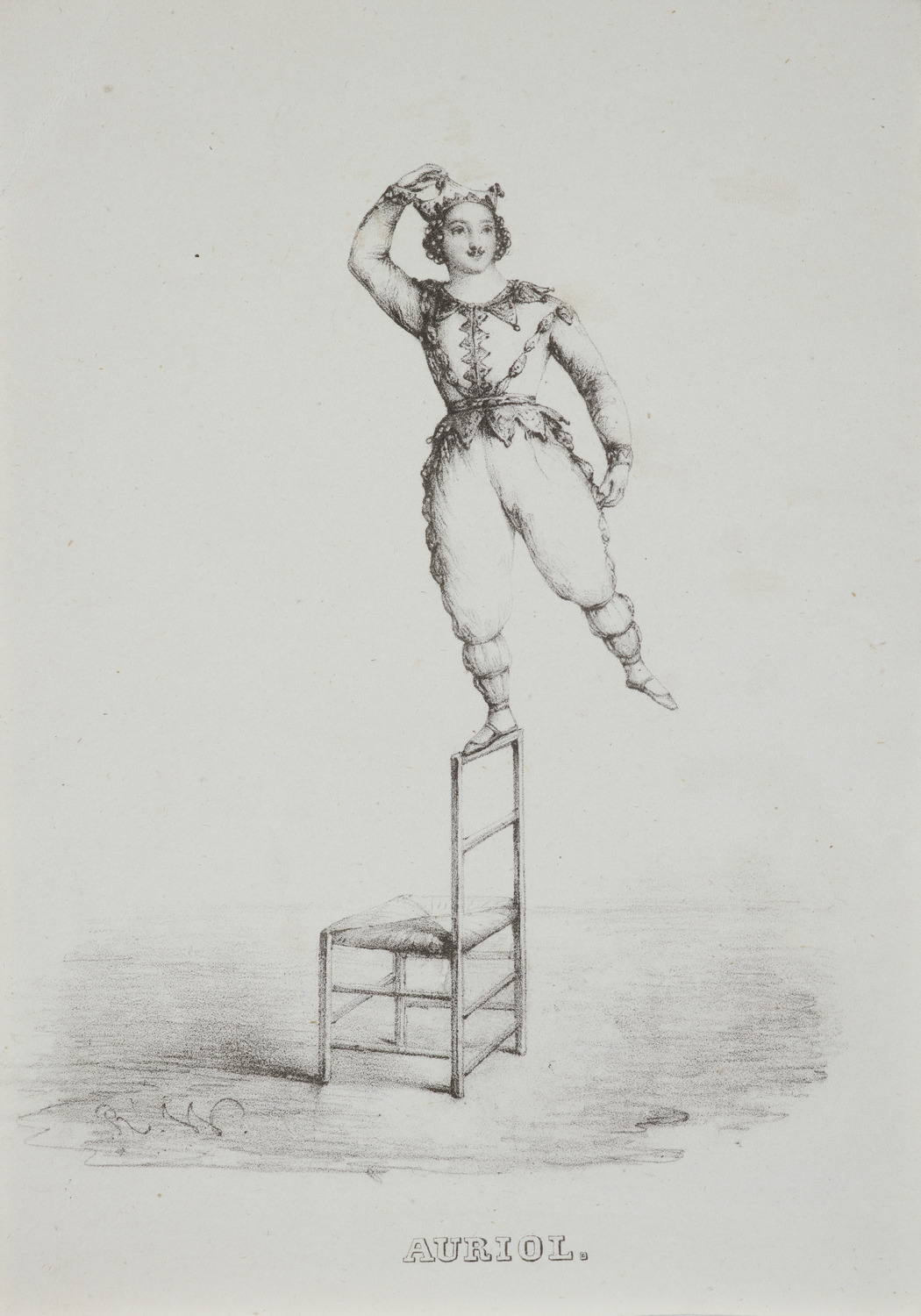
Rosario Weiss, Auriol, c. 1840.

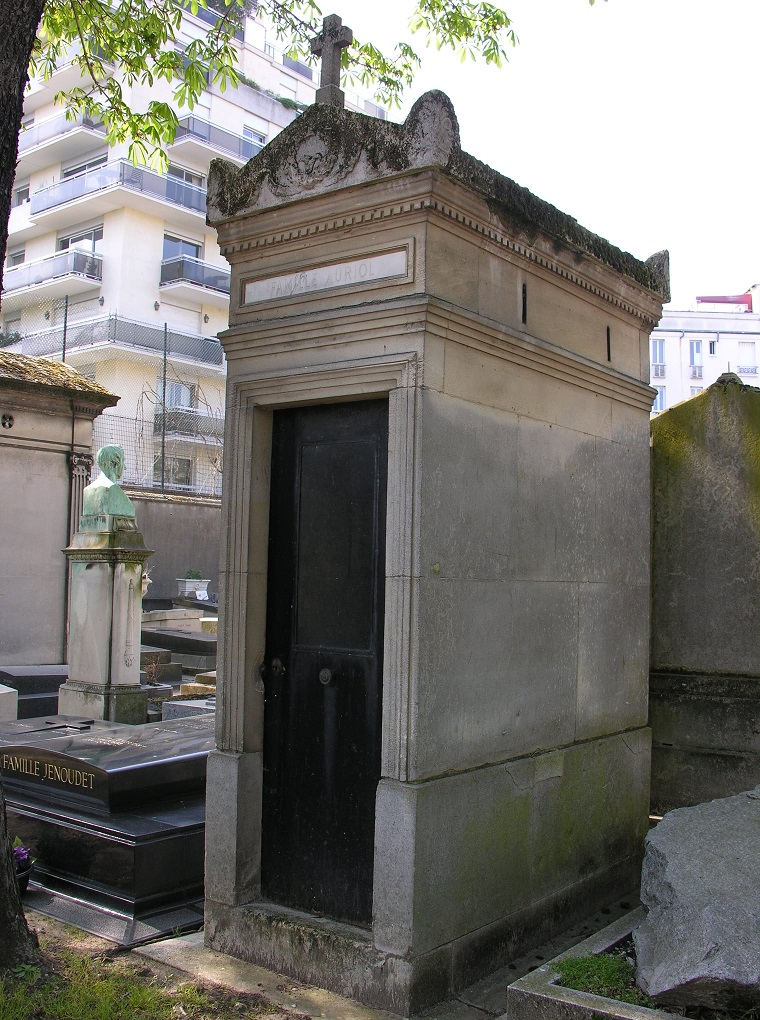
Grave of Jean-Baptiste Auriol in the Passy cemetery (division 2).
