= Louis Dejean =

Louis Dejean may refer to:

- Louis Dejean (sculptor), French sculptor and engraver
- Louis Dejean (circus owner), French showman and circus proprietor
