= Cirque d'Été =

Theatre in Paris, France (1841–1902)

Coordinates: 48.8692°N 2.3119°E

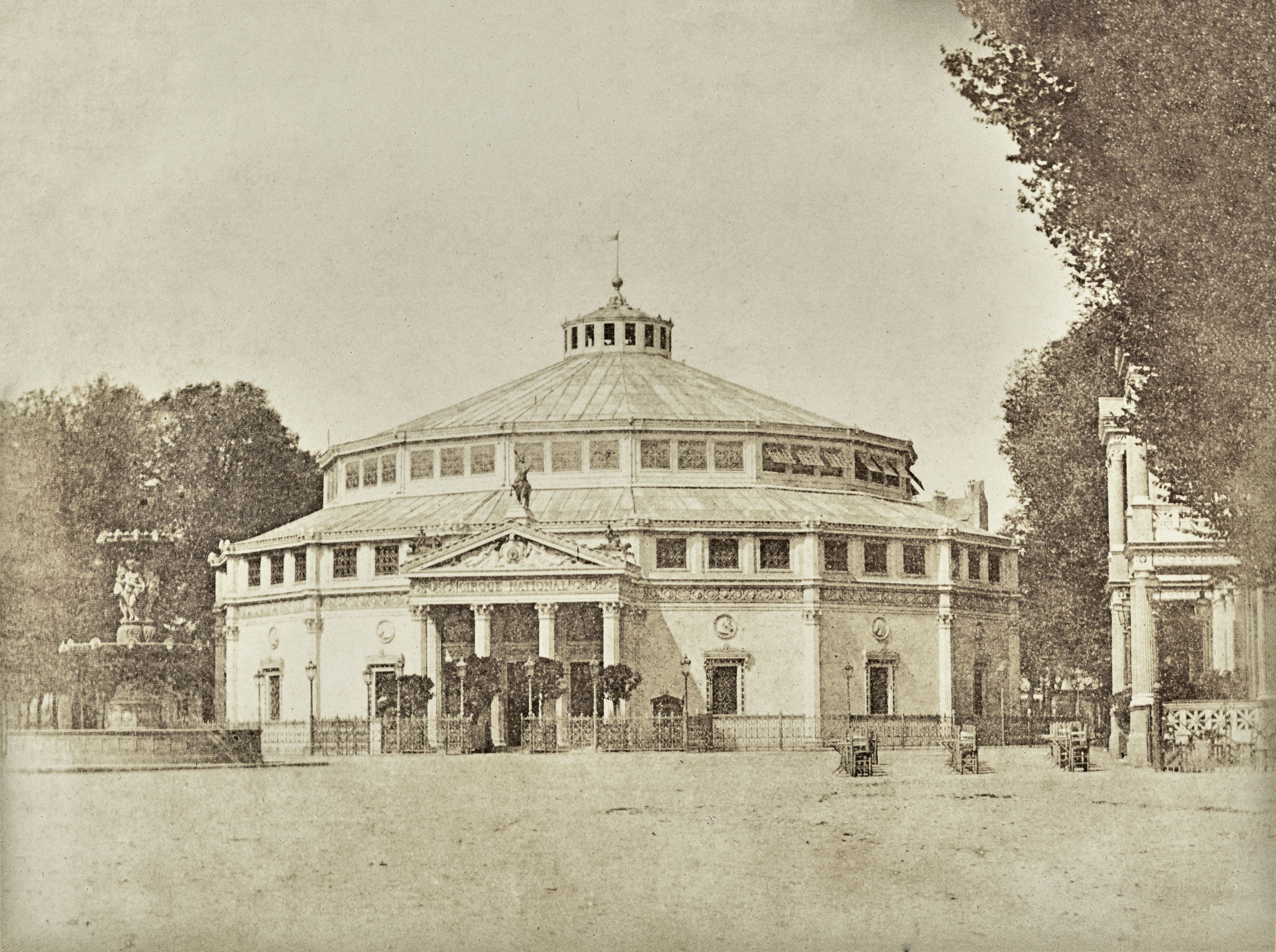
The Cirque d'Été on the Champs-Élysées

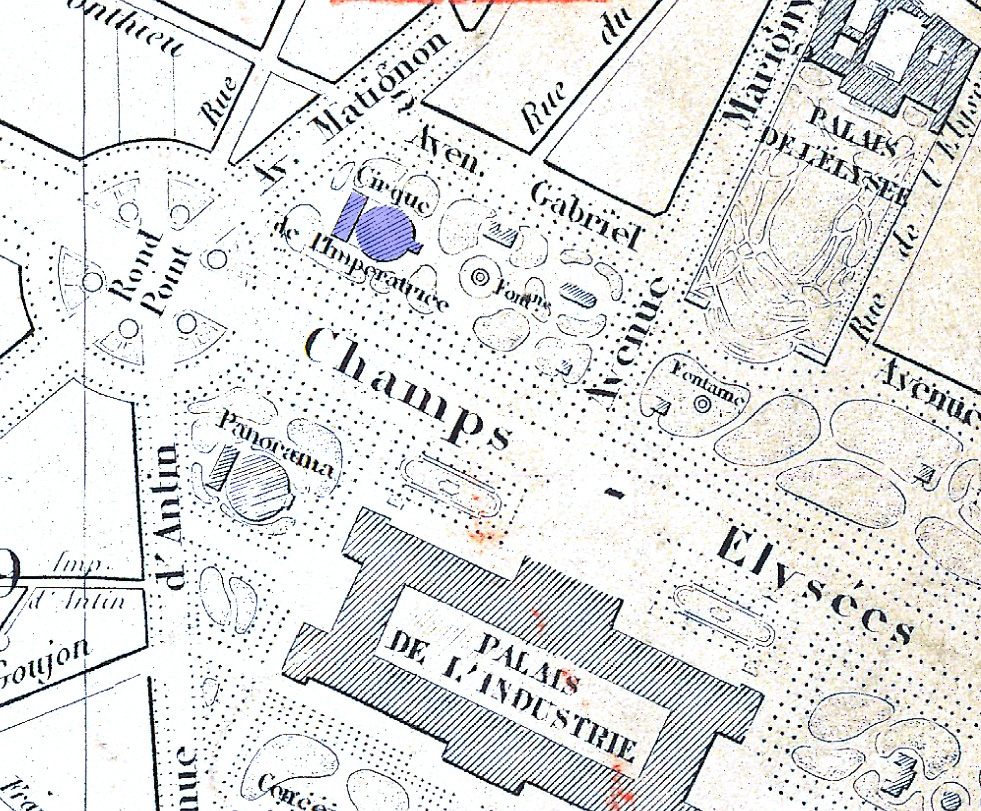
An 1869 map (theatre marked in blue)

The Cirque d'Été (French pronunciation: [siʁk dete], Summer Circus), a former Parisian equestrian theatre and indoor hippodrome, was built in 1841 to designs by the architect Jacques Hittorff. It was used as the summer home of the Théâtre Franconi, the equestrian troupe of the Cirque Olympique, the license for which had been sold in 1836 to Louis Dejean by Adolphe Franconi, the grandson of its founder, Antonio Franconi. The cirque was later also used for other purposes, including grand concerts conducted by Hector Berlioz.

The new theatre was located on the north-east side of the present Rond-Point of the Champs-Élysées. At first called the Cirque National, it also became known as the Cirque des Champs-Élysées and the Cirque Olympique des Champs-Élysées. In 1853 it was renamed Cirque de l'Impératrice (in honor of the new Empress Eugénie), a name which it retained until the fall of the empire in 1870.

The cirque on the Champs-Élysées should not be confused with the same company's winter theatre, the Cirque Olympique on the Boulevard du Temple, which had opened in 1827, or with the company's later winter theatre, the Cirque Napoléon (on the rue des Filles Calvaires), also built for Louis Dejean and opened in 1852. The latter theatre dropped the name Cirque Napoléon in 1870 and became primarily known as the Cirque d'Hiver (Winter Circus). The theatre on the Champs-Élysées was demolished in 1902.

== Construction and design ==
In 1836, Louis Dejean, the owner of the Cirque Olympique on the boulevard du Temple, obtained an additional license for a summer tent-circus at the Carré Marigny on the Champs-Élysées. This was replaced in 1841 by a polygonal stone edifice with 16 sides. A pedimented porch on the east side was surmounted with a bronze equestrian statue designed by Pradier, and panels on the other sides sported ornamental bas-relief horses' heads designed by Duret and Bosio. The theatre was spacious and held as many as 4,000 to 6,000 spectators. To the north was a rectangular building which included the stables. The interior was decorated in a Moorish style, and the roof was supported by light iron columns. The ceiling was decorated with compartments enclosing equestrian figures, and a chandelier with 130 gas jets hung over the center of the performance ring, which was surrounded by sixteen rows of seats. The stadium-style seating was "raked so sharply that those who wished might admire the costumes of fashionable women from head to toe."

== Berlioz concerts ==
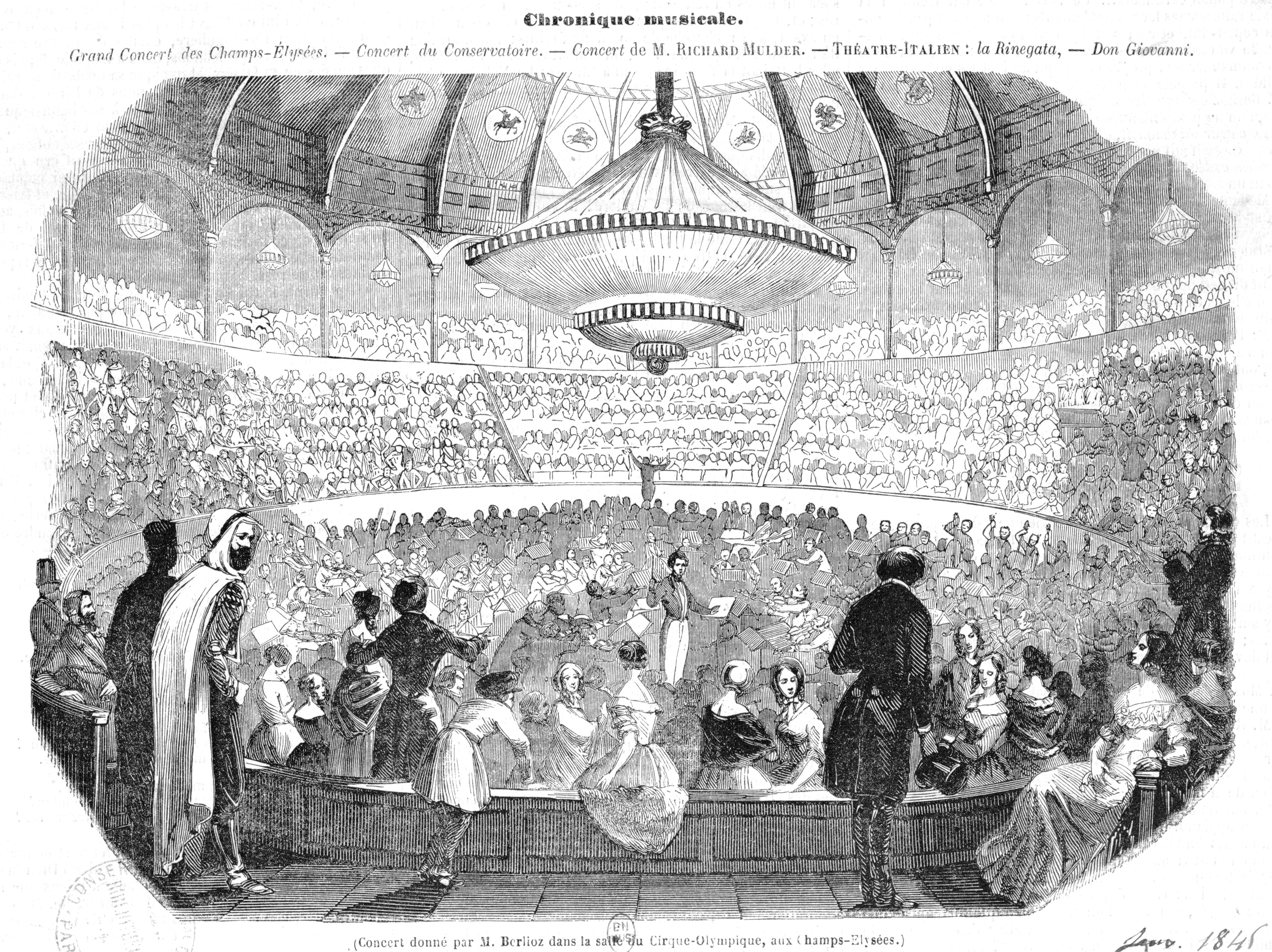
Berlioz conducting a grand concert at the Cirque Olympiqe on the Champs-Élysées (January 1845)

The director of the theatre, a man by the name of Gallois, soon installed heating, and, being aware of the great success of the monster concert presented by Hector Berlioz at the nearby Festival de l'Industrie during the summer of 1844, engaged the composer for a series of six grand concerts to be presented at the Cirque that winter on Sunday afternoons, a day when no competing ones would be given at the Paris Conservatoire. The contract stipulated that Berlioz would hire and rehearse the orchestra and chorus, select the music, and conduct the performances. Berlioz engaged 350 players and singers for the concerts and held sectional rehearsals at the Salle Herz. Fortunately, Gallois underwrote all the costs.

The first concert on 19 January 1845 included Beethoven's "Emperor" Concerto with Charles Hallé as the piano soloist, excerpts from Gluck's operas Alceste and Orphée, as well as works by Berlioz, including the overture Le carnaval romain, La tour de Nice (the original version of the overture Le corsaire), and the "Dies irae" and "Tuba mirum" from his requiem mass, the Grande Messe des morts. The latter two excerpts were played at the conclusion of all the concerts.

The second concert on 16 February had the theme séance orientale, in keeping with the decoration of the hall. The program included Félicien David's symphonic ode Le désert, the Austrian "lion-pianist" Léopold de Meyer playing his Marche marocaine, Op. 22 (subtitled "War-song of the Turks"), and Berlioz's overture to Les francs-juges. Apparently, Meyer's Marche "electrified the audience, and was furiously encored."

The third concert on 16 March was organized around the theme séance russe. There was music by the Russian composer Mikhail Glinka, who was in Paris at the time and attended the concerts, which included excerpts from his opera A Life for the Tsar and a ballet from his opera Russlan and Ludmilla. The finale from Berlioz's dramatic symphony Roméo et Juliette had a Russian bass singing the role of Friar Laurence. The concert also included L'invitation à la valse, Berlioz's orchestration of Carl Maria von Weber's piano piece Invitation to the Dance (which Berlioz had inserted as part of the ballet in his edition of Weber's opera Der Freischütz prepared for a production at the Paris Opera in 1841). Apparently Glinka was quite pleased with the music he heard by Berlioz: he soon departed on a trip to Spain planning to compose fantaisies pittoresque in the style of Berlioz.

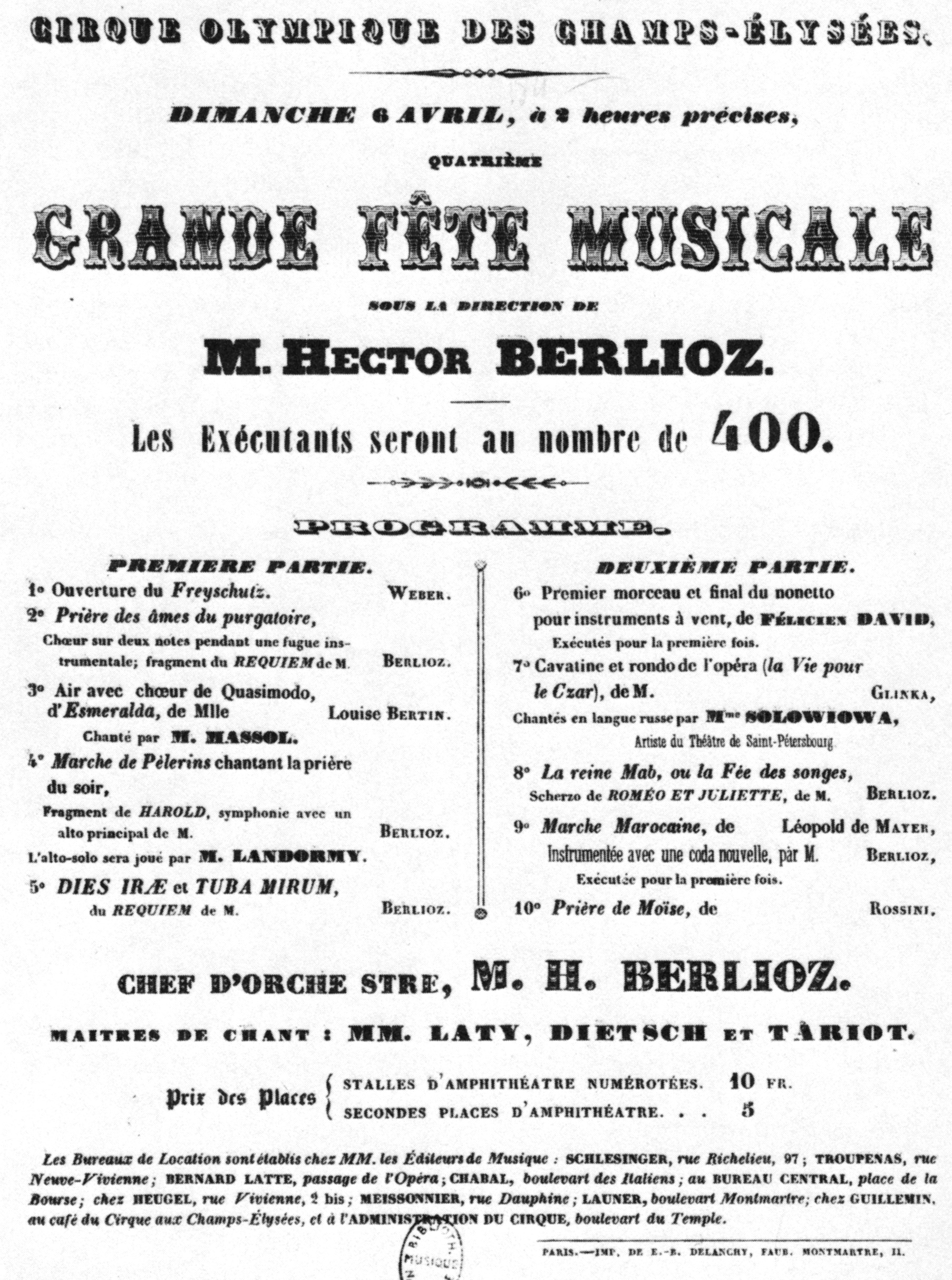
Handbill for the concert on 6 April 1845

The fourth program on 6 April was billed as a séance Berlioz and included the overture from Weber's Freischütz, excerpts from Berlioz's symphonies Harold en Italie and Roméo et Juliette, and Quasimodo's aria with chorus from Louise Bertin's opera La Esmeralda sung by the tenor Jean-Étienne-Auguste Massol, who had created the role at the Paris Opera in 1836. (At the premiere the aria had made such a good impression that Alexandre Dumas had cried out "It's by Berlioz! It's by Berlioz!". Berlioz denied that he had written any of the music, and only suggested an improvement to its ending.) The concert also included the first performance of Berlioz's orchestration of Meyer's Marche marocaine.

Although the first two concerts at the Cirque were well attended, the numbers quickly declined and the series closed after the fourth concert. The location, not a popular spot in the wintertime, was probably partly to blame, as were the acoustics of the hall, which was too reverberant. In addition, the ticket prices of 5 francs for the upper level and 10 francs for the lower were significantly higher than the 1 and 2 francs typically charged for an equestrian show.

Berlioz was later to write in his memoirs:

"I do not remember what terms we agreed on; I know only that it turned out badly for him [Gallois]. The takings of the four concerts, for which we had engaged five hundred performers, were inevitably insufficient to cover all the cost of such huge forces. Once again the place was quite unsuitable for music. This time the sound reverberated so slowly in that heart-breaking rotunda that compositions of any complexity gave rise to the most horrid confusions of harmony. Only one piece was really effective and that was the Dies irae from my Requiem. Its breadth of tempo and harmonic movement made it seem less incongruous than any of the others in those booming cathedral-like spaces. It scored such a success that we had to include it in the programme of every concert.

== Later history ==
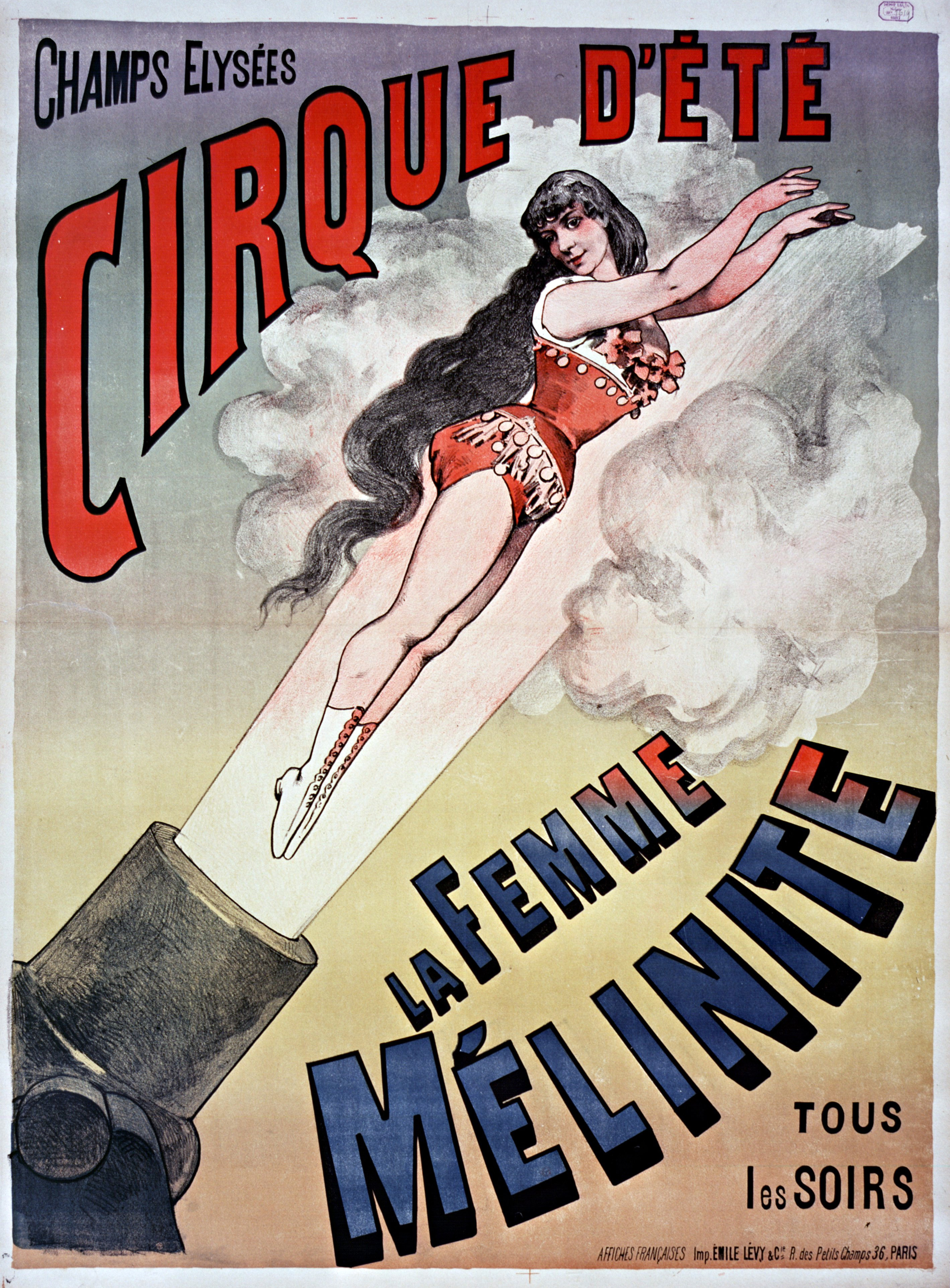
Poster for "La femme Mélinite" (1887)

The Cirque d'Été typically had relatively inexpensive ticket prices. In 1846, 1852, and 1862, spectators were paying 1 franc for the upper level seating and 2 francs for the lower. The theatre reached its apogee during the Second French Empire under the name Cirque de l'Impératrice (1853–1870), after which it became known as the Cirque d'Été or the Cirque des Champs-Élysées. Its big attraction for a long time was the clown Jean-Baptiste Auriol (1808–1881). La Belle Otero and Émilienne d'Alençon also made their debuts there.

Hittorf also designed a similar theatre, the Cirque Napoléon on the rue des Filles Calvaires which opened in 1852 and was renamed Cirque d'Hiver (Winter Circus) in 1870. The Cirque d'Été was only open in the summer from 1 May to 30 October, and the Cirque d'Hiver ran from 1 November to 30 April.

The Cirque d'Été's success continued into the 1880s. Many Parisians visited on Saturdays, and it was considered chic.

Public interest waned after the exposition universelle de 1889. It was demolished after 1900 (most likely in 1902) and gave its name to the rue du Cirque.
