= Clown Bar =

Bistro in Paris, France

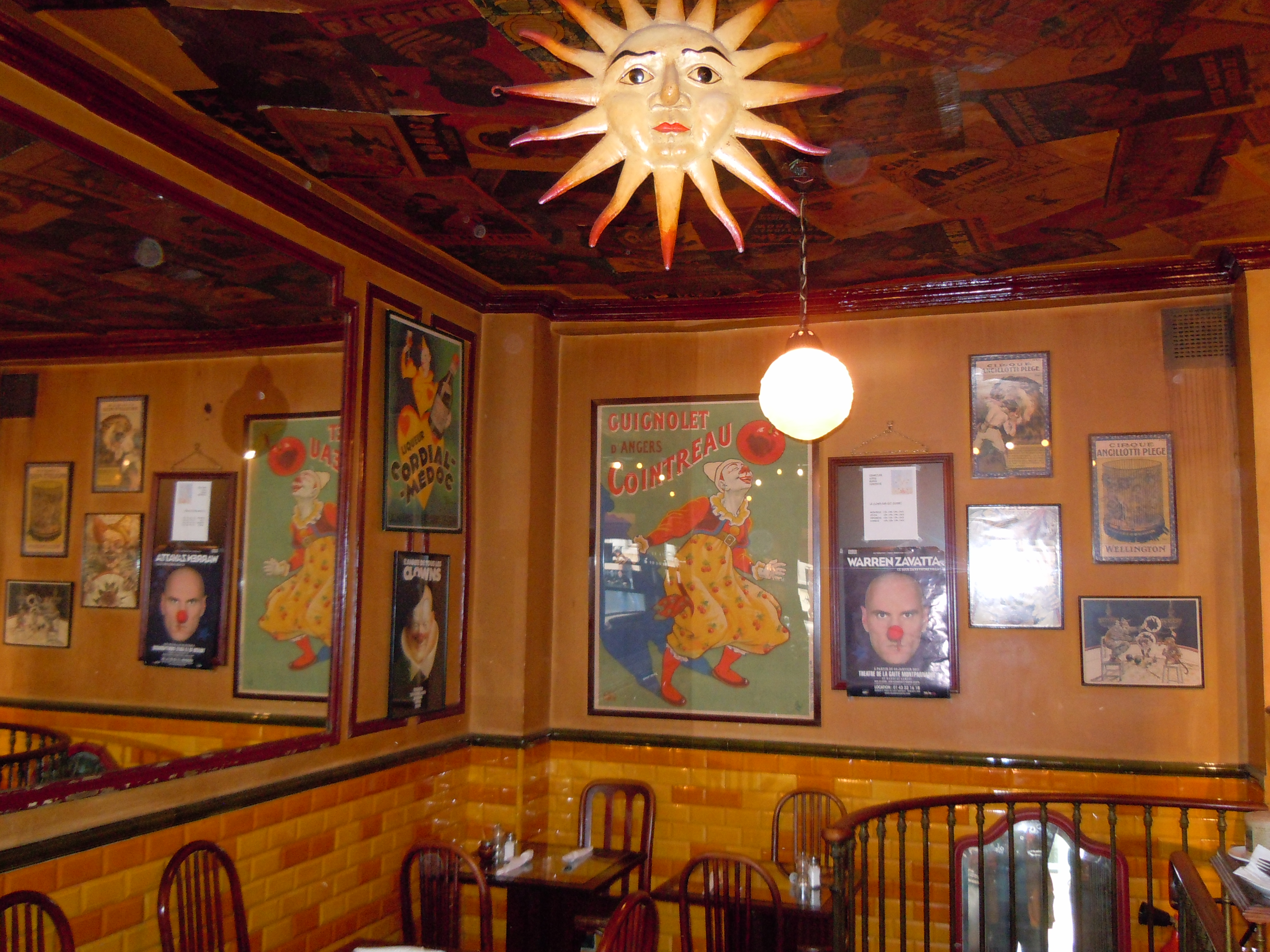

The Clown Bar is a bistro at 114 Rue Amelot in the 11th arrondissement of Paris. It has been classed as a monument historique since 1995.

Founded in 1902, it is situated two doors from the Cirque d'hiver at number 110. The bar has a frieze of ceramic panels showing clowns, put together in the 1920s by a factory in Sarreguemines.

Joe Vitte was the fifth owner of the establishment, for over 20 years. In 2014, Sven Chartier and Ewen Lemoigne, already owners of Saturne in the 2nd arrondissement, acquired the bistro and hired the Japanese chef Sota Atsumi.
