= Louis de Crussol, 14th Duke of Uzès =

French aristocrat and art collector

Louis de Crussol
- 14th Duke of Uzès
- Born: Louis Emmanuel de Crussol; 15 September 1871; Paris, France
- Died: 23 September 1943 (aged 72); Paris, France
- Noble family: Crussol
- Spouses: Marie Thérèse d'Albert de Luynes (m. 1894; div. 1938) Josephine Angela (m. 1939; died 1943)
- Issue: Anne de Crussol; Géraud de Crussol; Emmanuel de Crussol
- Father: Jacques Emmanuel de Crussol d'Uzès
- Mother: Anne de Rochechouart de Mortemart

Louis Emmanuel de Crussol, 14th Duke of Uzès (15 September 1871 – 23 September 1943) was a French aristocrat and art collector.

== Early life ==
Louis was born in Paris on 15 September 1871. He was the second son of the Emmanuel de Crussol, 12th Duke of Uzès (1852–1881) and Anne de Rochechouart de Mortemart. His elder brother was Jacques de Crussol, 13th Duke of Uzès. His sisters both married Dukes, Simone Louise Laure de Crussol (who married his wife's cousin, Honoré d'Albert, 10th Duke of Luynes), (Note: Honoré d'Albert, 10th Duke of Luynes (1868–1924) and the Duke of Uzès's wife, Marie Thérèse d'Albert de Luynes, were both grandchildren of Honoré-Louis d'Albert de Luynes, Duke of Chevreuse (1823–1854).) and Mathilde Renée de Crussol d'Uzès (who married François de Cossé Brissac, 11th Duke of Brissac). His father was elected to the legislature in 1871, sat on the right and voted against the creation of the Republic.

His mother inherited the Château de Boursault and a large fortune from her great-grandmother, Madame Clicquot Ponsardin, the founder of the Veuve Clicquot, and his maternal grandparents were Louis de Rochechouart and Marie Clémentine de Chevigné.

== Career ==
Upon the death of his elder brother in 1893, during a colonial expedition in Africa, he became the 14th Duke of Uzès. The title was the premier dukedom of France, and had been created in 1565.

During World War II, the Duke and Duchess remained in Paris during the German occupation. Before his death in 1943, he spent part of the occupation in a German prison camp. After the liberation of Paris, his widow received a citation from the United States government for Red Cross activities before she returned to her native homeland in 1947.

== Personal life ==
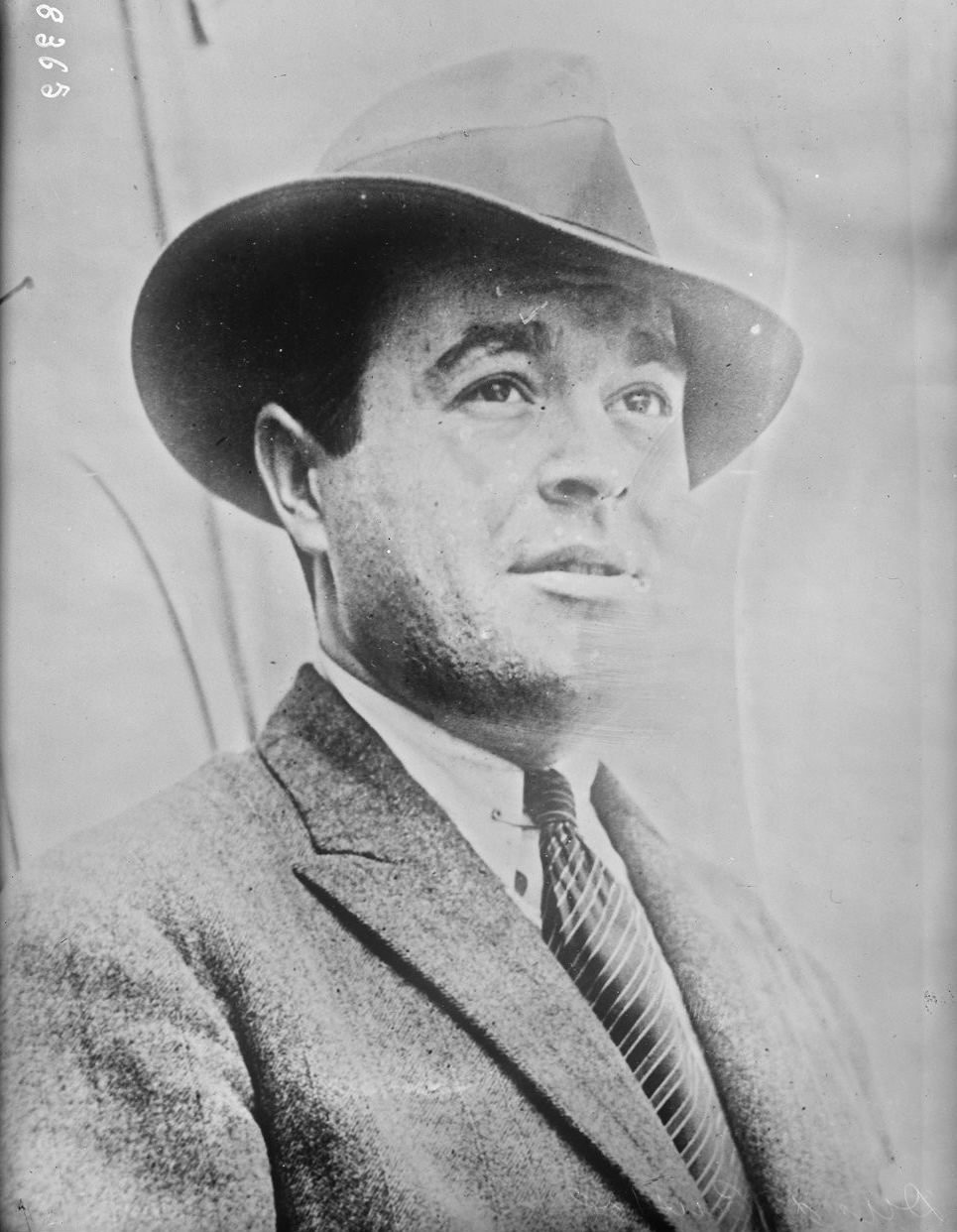
Photograph of his eldest son, Géraud, 1921

On 10 January 1894, he married Marie Thérèse d'Albert de Luynes (1876–1941) in the Chapel of the Convent of the Sacred Heart. She was the only daughter of Princess Sophie Galitzine, and Paul d'Albert de Luynes, Duke of Chaulnes and Picquigny, who both died young. Her only sibling, Emmanuel d'Albert de Luynes, died shortly after his marriage to American heiress Theodora Mary Shonts in 1908. (Note: Her nephew, Emmanuel Théodore Bernard Marie d'Albert de Luynes, Duke de Chaulnes (1908–1980), was born after the death of her brother.) Before their divorce on 22 February 1938, they were the parents of:

- Anne Emmanuelle Sophie Pauline Marie Thérèse de Crussol (1895–1984), who married Gaston de La Rochefoucauld, a descendant of the second son of François Alexandre Frédéric, duc de La Rochefoucauld-Liancourt, in Paris in 1919.
- Géraud François Marie Paul de Crussol (1897–1929), styled Duke of Crussol, who married Evelyn Anne Gordon, daughter of Scots-American millionaire John Gordon and Rosalie Georgina (née Murray) Gordon of New York and London, in 1921.
- Emmanuel de Crussol (1902–1952), styled Marquis of Crussol, who married Marie Louise Béziers.

After their divorce, he married the American Josephine Angela (1886–1966) in 1939.

The Duke of Uzès died on 23 September 1943 in Paris. As his eldest son predeceased him, he was succeeded in the dukedom by his grandson, Emmanuel. When Emmanuel died in 1999 without male issue, the dukedom passed to his cousin, Louis de Crussol d'Uzès (1925–2001), the son of the 14th Duke's second son.

French nobility
Preceded by Jacques de Crussol d'Uzès	Duke of Uzès; 1893–1943	Succeeded by Emmanuel de Crussol d'Uzès
