= Cirque d'hiver =

Cirque d'Hiver
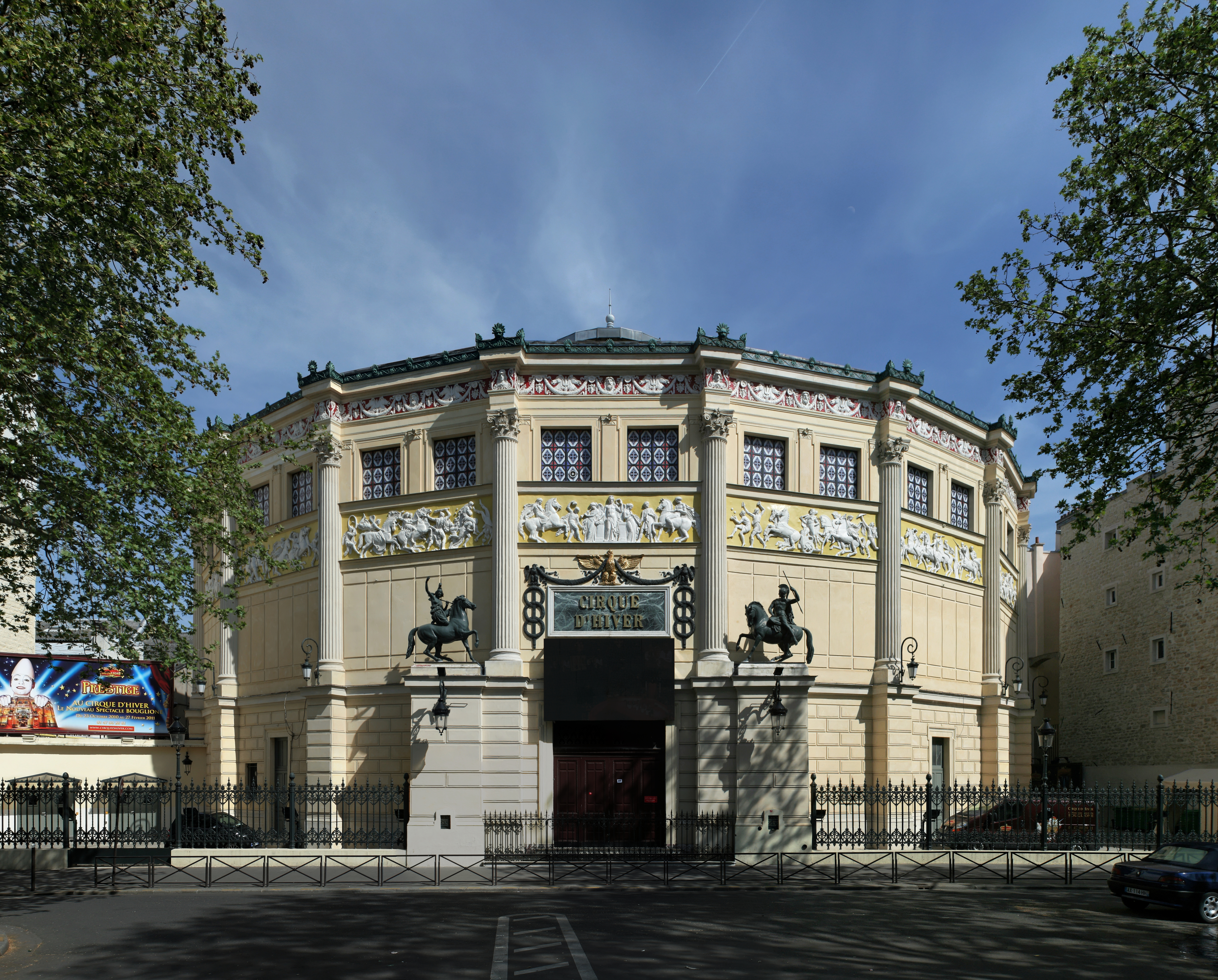
- The Cirque d'Hiver in 2011

- Location within Paris
- Former names: Cirque Napoléon, Cirque National
- Alternative names: Cirque d'Hiver-Bouglione

General information
- Type: Auditorium
- Location: 110 Rue Amelot, Paris, France
- Coordinates: 48.86337°N 2.36753°E
- Construction started: 17 April 1852
- Inaugurated: 11 December 1852; 173 years ago

Dimensions
- Diameter: 42 metres (138 ft)

Design and construction
- Architect: Jacques Ignace Hittorff

Other information
- Seating capacity: 2090

Website
- http://www.cirquedhiver.com/

The Cirque d'Hiver ("Winter Circus"), located at 110 rue Amelot (at the juncture of the rue des Filles du Calvaire and rue Amelot, Paris 11ème), has been a prominent venue for circuses, exhibitions of dressage, musical concerts, and other events, including exhibitions of Turkish wrestling and even fashion shows. The theatre was designed by the architect Jacques Ignace Hittorff and was opened by Emperor Napoleon III on 11 December 1852 as the Cirque Napoléon. The orchestral concerts of Jules Etienne Pasdeloup were inaugurated at the Cirque Napoléon on 27 October 1861 and continued for more than twenty years. The theatre was renamed Cirque d'Hiver in 1870.

The nearest métro station is Filles du Calvaire.

== History ==
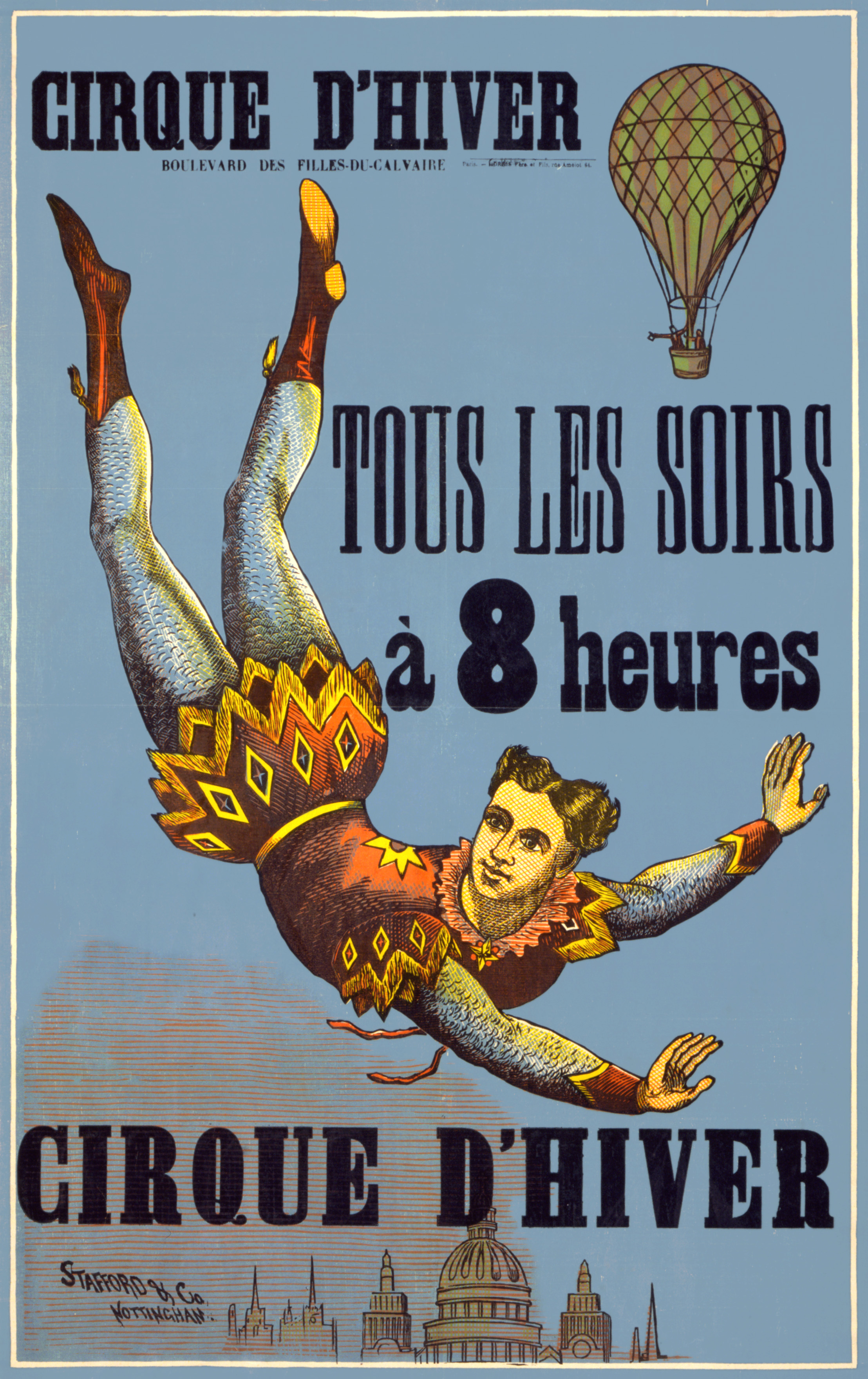
Late 19th century poster for the Cirque d'Hiver

The circus is an oval polygon of 20 sides, with Corinthian columns at the angles, giving the impression of an oval building enclosing the oval ring, surrounded by steeply banked seating for spectators, very much like a miniature indoor Colosseum. A low angled roof is self-supporting like a low dome, so that there is no central pole, as under a tent, to obstruct views or interfere with the action.

The building was designed by the architect Jacques Ignace Hittorff and opened as the Cirque Napoléon, a compliment to the new Emperor of the French Napoleon III. The sculptor James Pradier was called upon to provide exterior bas-reliefs of Amazons, and Francisque Duret and Astyanax-Scévola Bosio sculpted the panels of mounted warriors. The guiding entrepreneur was Louis Dejean, the proprietor of the Cirque d'Été ("Summer Circus") erected annually in the bosquets that flanked the Champs-Élysées. Dejean wagered that evening circus performances under the limelight, with the spectators well removed from the dust and smells of the tanbark floor, would provide a dress occasion for le tout-Paris, and he was well rewarded for his acumen.

At the end of the Second Empire, the Cirque d'Hiver was renamed the Cirque National, and was administered by Victor Franconi. It was given its present name in 1873. Henri de Toulouse-Lautrec repeatedly found inspiration in rehearsals and performances at the Cirque d'Hiver; Georges Seurat painted an afternoon performance, with a distinctly middle-class audience, in The Circus, one of the greatest unfinished canvases in the history of Western painting (1890–91, Musée d'Orsay). Franconi's son Charles assumed direction, 1897–1907. Since 1934 it has been the Cirque d'Hiver-Bouglione, operated by the Bouglione brothers and their heirs. The original configuration accommodated 4,000, which has now been reduced to 2,090 due to fire codes.

The Cirque d'hiver was the site of the organization meeting of the American Legion from March 15 to 17, 1919. The American Legion was originally founded as an organization for American veterans of the First World War and has since expanded its membership to include veterans of subsequent conflicts. It is the largest veterans organization in the United States.

At the Cirque d'Hiver in August 1955, Richard Avedon took his famous photograph of the fashion model "Dovima with the Elephants" to show a floor-length evening dress by Dior, one of the most iconic fashion photographs of the century. In 1995, Parisian designer Thierry Mugler held a special fashion show at the circus, to celebrate his firm's 20th anniversary. Performers and special guests included James Brown, Tippi Hedren and many of the decade's top supermodels, including Naomi Campbell. British designer Katharine Hamnett also chose the venue for some of her typically exuberant catwalk presentations.

== Cirque d'Hiver in fiction ==
- In 1956 Carol Reed directed the film Trapeze. It was in part filmed at the Cirque d'hiver.
- Elizabeth Bishop wrote a poem titled "Cirque D'Hiver".

== See also ==
- List of works by James Pradier Horsed Amazon sculpture
- Clown Bar, clown-themed bar two doors away, frequented by performers

== Sources ==
- Simeone, Nigel (2000). Paris: A Musical Gazetteer. New Haven: Yale University Press. ISBN 978-0-300-08053-7.
