= Émilienne d'Alençon =

French dancer, actress and courtesan

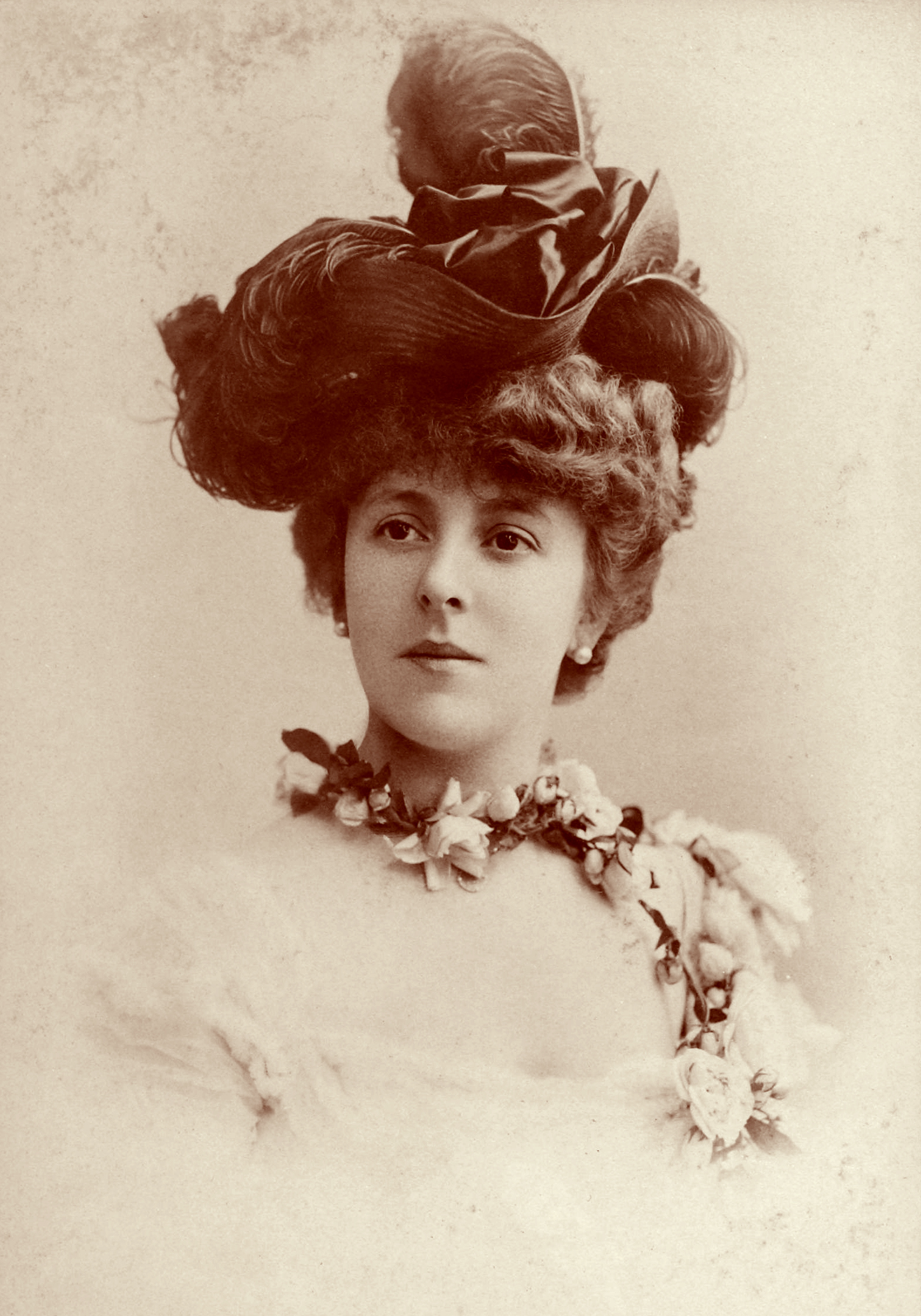
- Émilienne d'Alençon
- Born: 17 July 1870; Paris, France
- Died: 14 February 1945 (aged 74); Monaco
- Resting place: Batignolles cemetery, Paris
- Spouse: Percy Woodland (m. 1895)

Émilienne d'Alençon (17 July 1870 – 14 February 1945) was a French dancer, actress, and courtesan.

== Biography ==
Born in Paris, d'Alençon made her début at the Cirque d'été in 1889 before appearing at the Casino de Paris, Menus-Plaisirs, Folies Bergère, Paris Scala, and the Théâtre des Variétés.

Among her earlier shows were Paris Boulevards, Vénus d'Arles, and Que d'eau Que d'eau. She appeared in La Belle et la Bête at the Folies Bergère and she danced in the ballet The Red Slippers in London. She also performed as a dancer at the Paris Olympia in Faust and Ballet Féerie. In 1892, she came on stage as a snake dancer.

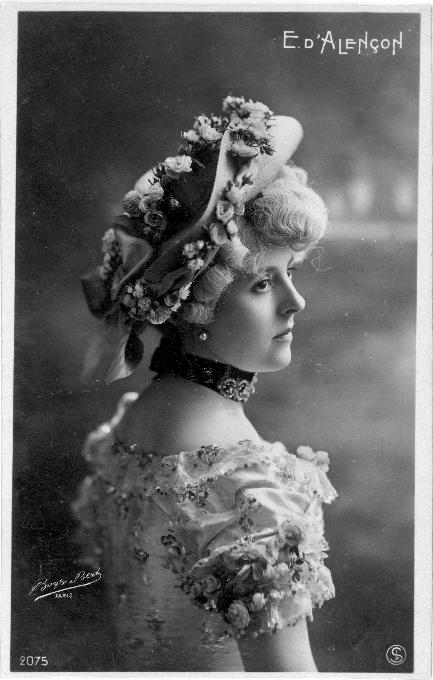

Renowned as a courtesan, she was involved in a number of affairs including one with the industrialist Étienne Balsan. In 1895, she married the jockey Percy Woodland.

Émilienne d'Alençon left the stage in 1906 and invested in horse racing. After losing her fortune on drugs and gambling in 1931, she was forced to sell her property and lavish furniture. She died in Monaco on 14 February 1945 and was buried at the Batignolles cemetery in Paris in the mausoleum of her maternal family, the Normand chapel.

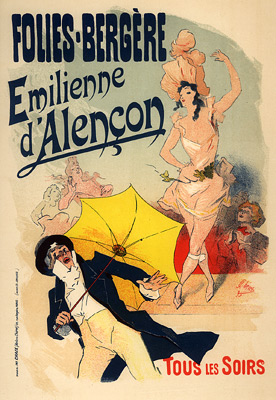
Poster from between 1896 and 1900 "Émilienne d'Alençon, tous les soirs"

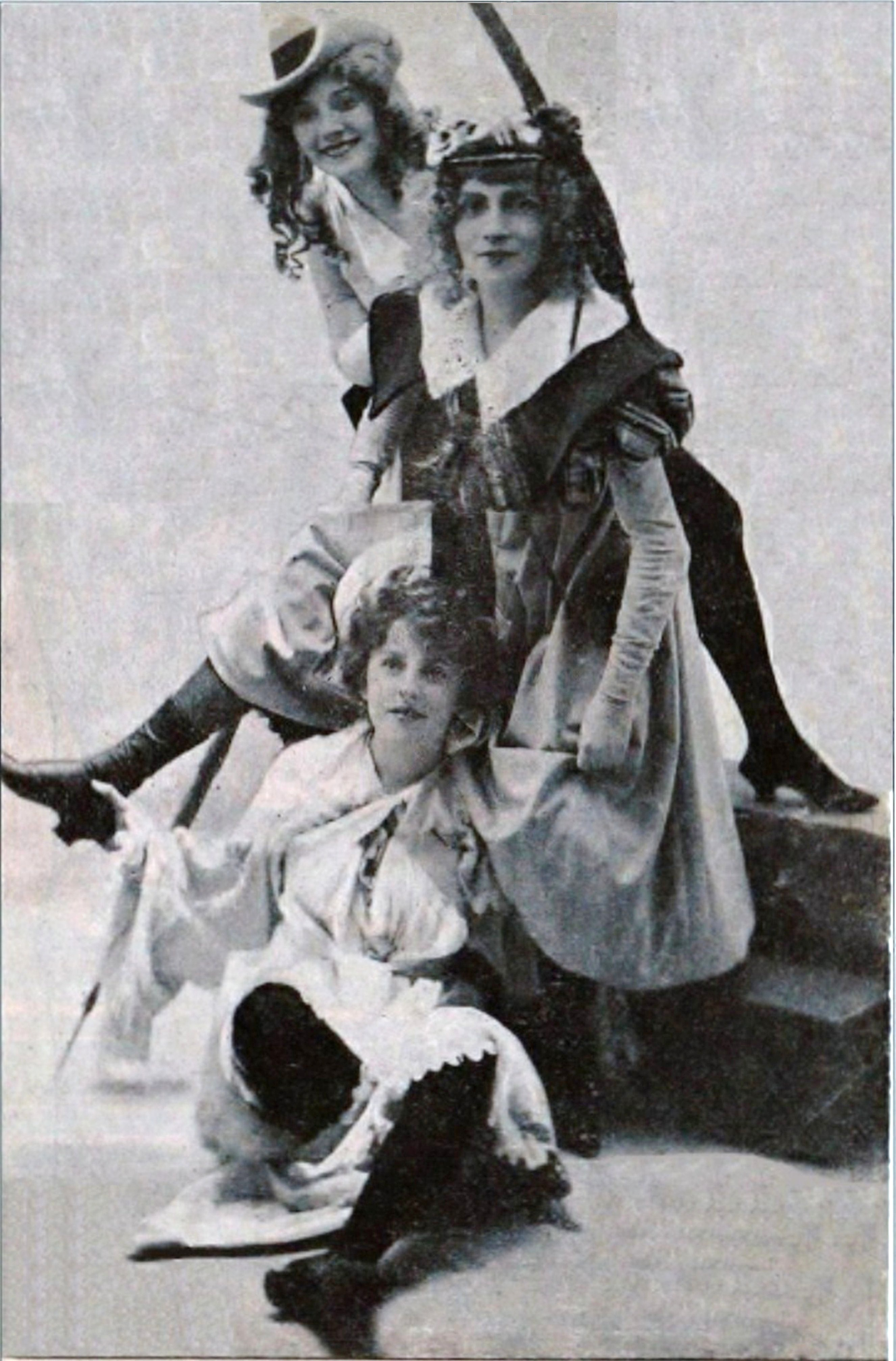
Amélie Diéterle, Ève Lavallière and Émilienne d'Alençon, at the Théâtre des Variétés, in Paris in 1898.

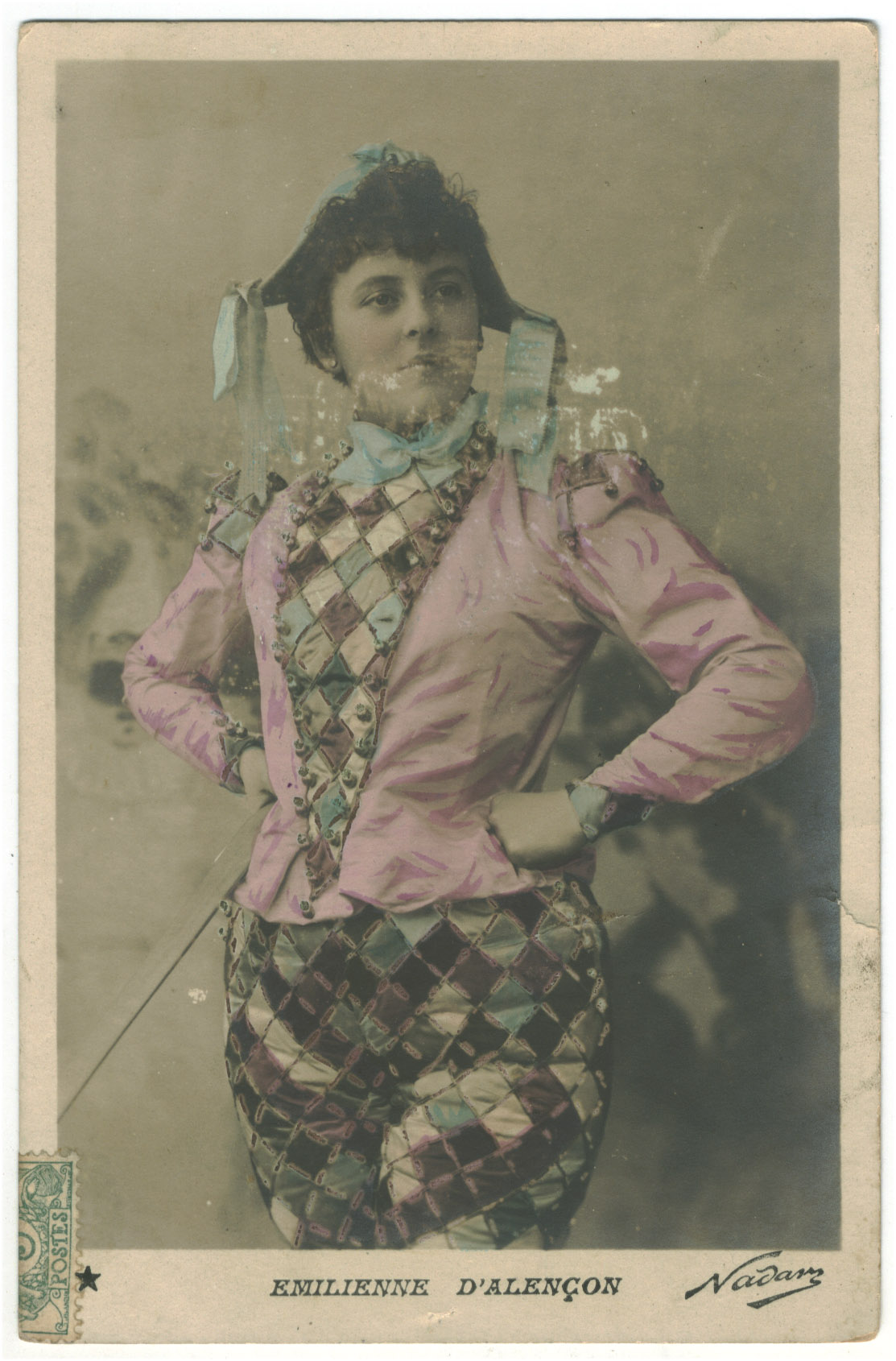
(Nadar)

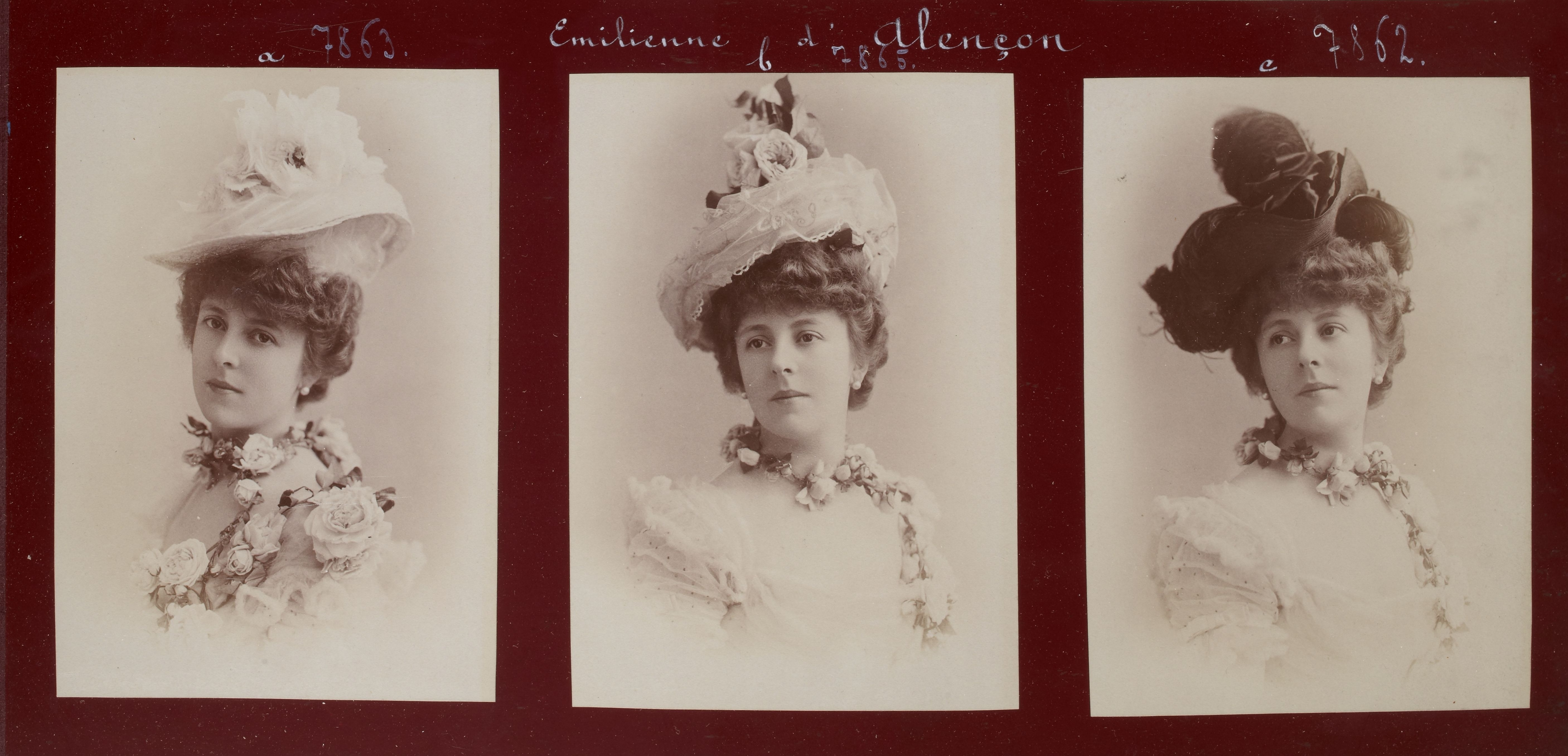

== In popular culture ==
She has been portrayed in film by Karen Black in Chanel Solitaire (1981) and by Emmanuelle Devos in Coco Before Chanel (2009).

== See also ==
- Women in dance

== Literature ==
- Auriant (pseud. d'Alexandre Hadjivassiliou). Émilienne d'Alençon. Bruxelles: Éditions de la nouvelle revue belgique, 1942
- Ochaim B., Balk C.: Varieté-Tänzerinnen um 1900. Vom Sinnenrausch zur Tanzmoderne, Ausstellung des Deutschen Theatermuseums München 23. Oktober 1998 – 17. Januar 1999., Stroemfeld, Frankfurt/M. 1998, ISBN 3-87877-745-0
- Dufresne Cl. Trois grâces de la Belle Epoque. Paris: Bartillat, 2003
