= Louis Dejean (circus owner) =

French circus director (1786-1879)

- Born: Louis Dejean; July 15, 1786; Montfort-l'Amaury, France
- Died: October 12, 1879 (aged 93); Cesson, Seine-et-Marne, France
- Occupation: Circus proprietor
- Known for: Cirque d'Été; Cirque d'hiver
- Awards: Officer of the Legion of Honour

Louis Dejean (July 15, 1786 – October 12, 1879) was a French showman and circus proprietor. He founded and directed the Cirque d'Été and the Cirque d'hiver.

== Early life ==
Louis Dejean was born on July 15, 1786, in Montfort-l'Amaury, France.

== Career ==
He entered the workforce in Paris as an assistant to a butcher. He purchased the business with his savings in 1811 at the age of 19, after his employer declared bankruptcy.

By 1826, Dejean possessed a large tract of land located on Boulevard du Temple. He leased the property to Laurent and Henri Franconi for their new Cirque Olympique, which opened on March 31, 1827.

He sold his butcher shop in 1835. That same year, when Adolphe Franconi declared bankruptcy, Dejean acquired the Cirque Olympique for 500,000 francs and kept Franconi and Ferdinand Laloue on as working partners. In May 1835, he obtained authorization to erect a tent at the entrance of Carré Marigny, on the Champs-Élysées, which became a wooden circus three years later. By 1840, Dejean had accumulated substantial profits from the war pantomimes he had staged since the circus's establishment. He personally directed the staging of these productions.

He soon converted the wooden circus into the Cirque d'Été ("Summer Circus"), commissioning Jacques Hittorff to design its new stone building on the Champs-Élysées in 1841. He sold the Boulevard du Temple location of the Cirque Olympique in 1847, and the building became the Opéra-National by Adolphe Adam. He maintained the establishment at Carré Marigny with Adolphe Franconi, who continued as his partner and ringmaster until Franconi's death. After the revolutions of 1848, the venue reverted to its former name, Cirque Olympique, in 1849.

He expanded his operations internationally by touring with his company. Dejean and his co-director Adolphe Franconi changed the name of the Cirque des Champs-Élysées (Cirque d'Été) to the Cirque National de Paris in 1848. After performing at London's Drury Lane theatre that year, Dejean brought the troupe to Berlin on December 22, 1850, achieving significant success at the Friedrichstraße circus before leaving in April 1852.

On December 11, 1852, Dejean introduced the Cirque Napoléon to Paris. Napoleon III's attendance at the inauguration represented his first public event as French Emperor. Designed by Hittorff and built in Paris, the permanent venue provided winter quarters for his travelling circus company, while his Cirque d'Été on the Champs-Élysées operated during the summer season. The establishment was later renamed the Cirque d'Hiver ("Winter Circus") in 1870.

He settled in Cesson upon his retirement in 1872, dying there seven years afterwards.

== Death ==
Louis Dejean died on October 12, 1879, in Cesson, Seine-et-Marne, France, at 94.

== Legacy ==
The French government awarded Louis Dejean the Officer of the Legion of Honour, its highest civilian distinction.

His winter circus, the Cirque d'Hiver, holds the Guinness World Records distinction of being the oldest permanent circus building still functioning today.
